= 2016 Rose Bowl =

American college football game

2016 Rose Bowl presented by Northwestern Mutual
- CFP New Year's Six; 102nd Rose Bowl Game
Stanford Cardinal	Iowa Hawkeyes
(11–2)	(12–1)
Pac-12	Big Ten
45	16
Head coach: David Shaw	Head coach: Kirk Ferentz
AP / Coaches / CFP; 5 / 6 / 6	AP / Coaches / CFP; 6 / 7 / 5
	1	2	3	4	Total
Stanford	21	14	3	7	45
Iowa	0	0	3	13	16
- Date: January 1, 2016
- Season: 2015
- Stadium: Rose Bowl
- Location: Pasadena, California
- MVP: Christian McCaffrey, RB (Stanford); Aziz Shittu, DE (Stanford)
- Favorite: Stanford by 6
- National anthem: Hawkeye Marching Band
- Referee: Reggie Smith (Big 12)
- Halftime show: Hawkeye Marching Band; Stanford Band
- Attendance: 94,268
- Payout: US$40 million to each team

United States TV coverage
- Network: ESPN and ESPN Radio
- Announcers: ESPN: Brent Musburger (play-by-play); Jesse Palmer (analyst); Maria Taylor (sideline); ESPN Radio: Dave Pasch, Brian Griese
- Nielsen ratings: 7.9 (13.6 million viewers)

International TV coverage
- Network: ESPN Deportes
- Announcers: Eduardo Varela, Pablo Viruega

The 2016 Rose Bowl was a college football bowl game that was played on January 1, 2016 at the Rose Bowl stadium in Pasadena, California. This 102nd Rose Bowl Game matched the Big Ten Conference West Division champion Iowa Hawkeyes against the Pac-12 Conference champion Stanford Cardinal. It was one of the 2015–16 bowl games that concluded the 2015 FBS football season. Sponsored by the Northwestern Mutual financial services organization, the game is officially known as the Rose Bowl Game presented by Northwestern Mutual. Stanford defeated Iowa 45–16 to win the championship and the Lathrop K. Leishman trophy.

The contest was televised on ESPN with a radio broadcast on ESPN Radio and XM Satellite Radio, which began at 1:30 p.m. (PST) with kickoff at 2:10 p.m. (PST). The Pasadena Tournament of Roses Association was the organizer of the game.

The Rose Bowl Game was a contractual sell-out, with 64,500 tickets allocated to the participating teams and conferences. The remaining tickets are distributed to the Tournament of Roses members, sponsors, City of Pasadena residents, and the general public. Ticket prices were $150 and $185.

== Pre-game activities ==
The game was presided over by the 2016 Rose Queen, the Royal Court, Tournament of Roses President Mike Matthiessen, and Ken Burns, the grand marshal. The theme of the parade and game was "Find Your Adventure".

After the teams' arrival in Southern California, the teams participated in the traditional Lawry's Beef Bowl in Beverly Hills and the Disney Media Day at the Disneyland Resort in nearby Anaheim. The Rose Bowl Hall of Fame ceremony luncheon was held prior to the game at the Pasadena Convention Center, where outstanding former players and participants were inducted into the hall. They were Mark Brunell, Washington; Jim Muldoon, Pac-10 Conference; Fritz Pollard, Brown; and Tyrone Wheatley, Michigan.

The bands and cheerleaders from both schools participated in the pre-game Rose Parade on Colorado Boulevard in Pasadena, California along with the floats.

== Teams ==
The teams playing in the Rose Bowl game were the highest ranking teams from the Pac-12 Conference and Big Ten Conference that were not selected to play in a College Football Playoff semifinal game. The teams were officially selected by the football committee of the Pasadena Tournament of Roses Association on Selection Sunday on December 6, 2015, based on the final rankings by the CFP committee. The Stanford Cardinal and the Iowa Hawkeyes met for the first time in this game.

=== Iowa ===
The Iowa Hawkeyes, as the Big Ten West Division Champions, were back in the Rose Bowl after 25 years, last appearing in the 1991 Rose Bowl. Their last win in Pasadena was against the California Bears, 38–12 in the 1959 Rose Bowl. Prior to the 2016 Rose Bowl, they were 2–3 in Rose Bowl games. In the 2015 season, the team was nearly undefeated before the Rose Bowl, losing only the Big Ten Championship Game to Michigan State 13–16. Iowa wore its black jerseys and used the west bench on game day.

=== Stanford ===
The Stanford Cardinal, 11-2 (8-1 in conference), were playing their fifteenth Rose Bowl game (and their third Rose Bowl Game in four years) by winning the Pac-12 Championship Game over USC 41–22. Prior to the 2016 Rose Bowl, they were 6–7–1 in Rose Bowl games, last winning over Wisconsin 20–14 in 2013. They lost the 2014 Rose Bowl to Michigan State 20–24. Stanford wore its white jerseys and used the east bench on game day.

== Game summary ==
Sports analysts had anticipated the contest to be exciting, due mainly to the matchup between Iowa's strong run defense and Stanford running back Christian McCaffrey, the Heisman Trophy runner-up. McCaffrey led the FBS in the 2015 season with 3,864 all-purpose yards, which came from punt/kick returns, runs from scrimmage, and passes out of the backfield. In contrast, Iowa's run defense finished the season ranked 14th, allowing only 121 yards per game and having defeated historically rushing teams like Wisconsin, Indiana, and Nebraska.

McCaffrey caught a short pass and turned it into a 75-yard touchdown on the first play from scrimmage. The Hawkeyes were unable to stop him, as he averaged 9.6 YPC (172 yards on 18 carries), returned a punt for a touchdown, and converted many third downs. Though he did not rush for any touchdowns from scrimmage, he proved to be the primary playmaker for Stanford, catching a third of Kevin Hogan's twelve passes. McCaffrey was such an offensive threat that Hogan was able to make large gains with the read option, including a wide-open first-quarter option TD run.

Iowa was unable to get their run game going, rushing as a team for 1.3 YPC (48 yards on 38 carries). The longest Iowa runs came from LeShun Daniels, Jr. and Akrum Wadley (14 and 12 yards, respectively), as well as a 14-yard scramble by Quarterback C.J. Beathard. Iowa's inability to establish a run game closed up Iowa's potential for play-action passing, which had been Beathard's bread and butter all season. Jordan Canzeri, Iowa's power halfback, was unable to churn significant yardage, and 3rd-team halfback Akrum Wadley (who had a 200-yard game at Northwestern, when Daniels and Canzeri were both injured) split ballcarrying duties with Daniels in the second half. Iowa's halfbacks, their biggest threat all season, were overall unable to garner any significant yardage on the ground; Derek Mitchell, Jr., Iowa's 4th-team halfback, saw significant action lining up in the backfield and caught 4 passes for 41 yards, and Wadley also contributed to the pass game by catching 3 for 60.

Stanford shut Iowa out in the first half 35–0, with Stanford's 35 points the most scored in the first half of a Rose Bowl in its entire 102-year history. Stanford's 21-0 first-quarter lead was also the most first-quarter points scored by one team in Rose Bowl history. McCaffrey gained a total of 368 all-purpose yards, setting another Rose Bowl record.

By the second half, Stanford's explosive offense slowed down, scoring just 10 second-half points versus their 35 first-half points. Iowa did not score until the 3rd quarter when placekicker Marshall Koehn kicked a field goal after converting on 4th down earlier in the drive; Beathard threw two touchdowns in the 4th quarter, with Koehn missing one of the two PATs.

Iowa had a slight advantage in time of possession, possessing the ball for almost 33 minutes, though they were simply unable to make meaning out of their possessions. Iowa also outgained Stanford through the air by a slim margin, with 239 yards to Stanford's 223.

=== Scoring summary ===
Scoring summary

Quarter	Time	Drive			Team	Scoring information	Score	
Quarter	Time	Plays	Yards	TOP	Team	Scoring information	STAN	IOWA
1	14:49	1	75	0:11	STAN	Christian McCaffrey 75-yard touchdown reception from Kevin Hogan, Conrad Ukropina kick good	7	0
1	9:13	8	74	3:32	STAN	Kevin Hogan 8-yard touchdown run, Conrad Ukropina kick good	14	0
1	4:07				STAN	Interception returned 66 yards for touchdown by Quenton Meeks, Conrad Ukropina kick good	21	0
2	14:12				STAN	Punt returned 63 yards for touchdown by Christian McCaffrey, Conrad Ukropina kick good	28	0
2	8:22	8	85	3:25	STAN	Michael Rector 31-yard touchdown reception from Kevin Hogan, Conrad Ukropina kick good	35	0
3	11:09	7	51	2:27	STAN	31-yard field goal by Conrad Ukropina	38	0
3	3:36	8	4	3:52	IOWA	39-yard field goal by Marshall Koehn	38	3
4	13:12	3	31	1:29	IOWA	Matt VandeBerg 31-yard touchdown reception from C. J. Beathard, Marshall Koehn kick no good	38	9
4	2:46	7	80	2:58	IOWA	Akrum Wadley 31-yard touchdown reception from C. J. Beathard, Marshall Koehn kick good	38	16
4	1:54	2	49	0:52	STAN	Michael Rector 42-yard touchdown reception from Kevin Hogan, Conrad Ukropina kick good	45	16
"TOP" = time of possession. For other American football terms, see Glossary of American football.							45	16

=== Statistics ===
Statistics	STAN	IOWA
First downs	19	18
Total offense, plays – yards	55–429	71–287
Rushes-yards (net)	34–206	38–48
Passing yards (net)	223	239
Passes, Comp-Att-Int	12–21–1	21–33–1
Time of Possession	27:09	32:51

Team	Category	Player	Statistics
Stanford	Passing	Kevin Hogan	12/21, 223 yds, 3 TD, 1 INT
Stanford	Rushing	Christian McCaffrey	18 car, 172 yds
Stanford	Receiving	Christian McCaffrey	4 rec, 105 yds, 1 TD
Iowa	Passing	C. J. Beathard	21/33, 239 yds, 2 TD, 1 INT
Iowa	Rushing	LeShun Daniels	10 car, 37 yds
Iowa	Receiving	Matt VandeBerg	4 rec, 64 yds, 1 TD

== Game notes ==
- Weather: Sunny, 64 °F (18 °C), wind 5 mph (8.0 km/h) SW

=== New records ===
- 368 was the most all-purpose yards per game set by Christian McCaffrey of Stanford
- Stanford's thirty-five points were the most scored in the first half by any Rose Bowl Game team in the Rose Bowl.
- Stanford's twenty-one points were the most scored in the first quarter by any Rose Bowl Game team in the Rose Bowl.

== Related events ==
- Selection Sunday, December 6, 2015
- Disneyland Resort Press Conference – December 26, 2015
- Lawry's Beef Bowl – December 27, 28, 2015
- Hall of Fame ceremony, Pasadena Convention Center, December 30, 2015
- Kickoff Luncheon, Rose Bowl, December 31, 2015
- Rose Bowl Game Public Tailgate, January 1, 2016
