= 2015 Stanford Cardinal football team =

American college football season

2015 Stanford Cardinal football

Pac-12 champion Pac-12 North Division champion Rose Bowl champion

Pac-12 Championship Game, W 41–22 vs. USC

Rose Bowl, W 45–16 vs. Iowa
- Conference: Pac-12 Conference
- North Division

Ranking
- Coaches: No. 3
- AP: No. 3
- Record: 12–2 (8–1 Pac-12)
- Head coach: David Shaw (5th season)
- Offensive coordinator: Mike Bloomgren (3rd season)
- Offensive scheme: Multiple
- Defensive coordinator: Lance Anderson (2nd season)
- Base defense: 3–4
- Home stadium: Stanford Stadium

2015 Pac-12 Conference football standings
	Conf.			Overall
Team	W		L	W		L
North Division
No. 3 Stanford xy$	8	–	1	12	–	2
No. 19 Oregon	7	–	2	9	–	4
Washington State	6	–	3	9	–	4
California	4	–	5	8	–	5
Washington	4	–	5	7	–	6
Oregon State	0	–	9	2	–	10
South Division
USC xy	6	–	3	8	–	6
No. 17 Utah x	6	–	3	10	–	3
UCLA	5	–	4	8	–	5
Arizona State	4	–	5	6	–	7
Arizona	3	–	6	7	–	6
Colorado	1	–	8	4	–	9
Championship: Stanford 41, USC 22
$ – Conference champion; x – Division champion/co-champions; y – Championship game participant; Rankings from AP Poll

The 2015 Stanford Cardinal football team represented Stanford University in the 2015 NCAA Division I FBS football season. The Cardinal were led by fifth-year head coach David Shaw. They played their home games at Stanford Stadium and were members of the North Division of the Pac-12 Conference.

In 2015, the Cardinal were the champions of the Pac-12. After finishing in first place in the North Division, they beat USC in the Pac-12 Championship Game by a score of 41–22. They defeated Iowa 45–16 in the Rose Bowl on January 1, 2016.

The Cardinal finished the season ranked No. 3 in the final Coaches Poll, their highest final ranking in the history of that poll. They were similarly ranked No. 3 in the final AP Poll, their highest final ranking in 75 years, following the 1940 national championship season.

== Personnel ==
=== Coaching staff ===
Name	Position	Stanford years	Alma mater
David Shaw	Head coach	9th	Stanford (1994)
Lance Anderson	Defensive coordinator / outside linebackers coach	9th	Idaho State (1996)
Mike Bloomgren	Associate head coach / offensive coordinator	5th	Florida State (1999)
Pete Alamar	Special teams coordinator	4th	Cal Lutheran (1983)
Duane Akina	Defensive backs coach	2nd	Washington (1979)
Peter Hansen	Inside linebackers coach	2nd	Arizona (2001)
Tavita Pritchard	Quarterbacks coach / wide receivers coach	3rd	Stanford (2009)
Randy Hart	Defensive linemen coach	6th	Ohio State (1970)
Eric Sanders	Defensive assistant	1st	UC Davis (2005)
Lance Taylor	Running backs coach	2nd	Alabama (2003)
Morgan Turner	Tight ends coach	3rd	Illinois (2009)

=== Roster ===
2015 Stanford Cardinal roster
Quarterbacks: 8 Kevin Hogan – (redshirt) senior (6'4, 220); 10 Keller Chryst – sophomore (6'5, 231); 17 Ryan Burns – (redshirt) sophomore (6'5, 225); Running backs: 5 Christian McCaffrey – sophomore (6'0, 197); 15 Reagan Williams Freshman (6'3, 218); 19 Ryan Gaertner Junior (5'10, 215); 20 Bryce Love Freshman (5'10, 184); 22 Remound Wright – (redshirt) senior (5'9, 198); 25 Cameron Scarlett Freshman (6'1, 220); 26 Barry J. Sanders – (redshirt) junior (5'10, 191); 35 Daniel Marx – sophomore (6'2, 247); 42 Pat McFadden – junior (5'10, 195); Wide receivers: 2 Trenton Irwin – freshman (6’2, 199); 3 Michael Rector – (redshirt) junior 6'1 190); 4 Jay Tyler – freshman (5'8, 167); 5 Kodi Whitfield – senior (6'2, 197); 6 Francis Owusu – junior (6'3, 193); 6 Taijuan Thomas – junior (5'10, 185); 11 Dontonio Jordan – (redshirt) junior (5'11, 188); 13 Rollins Stallworth – (redshirt) senior (6'4, 196); 19 J. J. Arcega-Whiteside – freshman (6'3, 207); 21 Isaiah Brandt-Sims – sophomore (5'11, 175); 41 Addison Johnson – sophomore (5'9, 175); 46 Sidhart Krishnamurthi – freshman (5'11, 175); 81 Conner Crane – (redshirt) junior (6'4, 195); 85 Treyvion Foster – junior (6'1, 213); 89 Devon Cajuste – (redshirt) senior (6'4, 232); Offensive guards/offensive tackles: 51 Joshua Garnett – senior (6'5, 317) OG; 54 Nick Wilson – freshman (6'3, 268) OG; 57 Johnny Caspers – (redshirt) junior (6'4, 292) OG; 60 Lucas Hinds – (redshirt) sophomore (6'4, 290) OG; 62 Austin Maihen – freshman – (6'5, 280) OG; 64 David Bright – (redshirt) sophomore (6'5, 290) OG/OT; 66 Nick Davidson – (redshirt) junior (6'7, 283) OT; 71 Brandon Fanaika – sophomore (6'3, 321) OG; 74 Brendon Austin – (redshirt) senior (6'6, 304) OG; 75 A. T. Hall – sophomore (6'5, 278) OT; 76 Jack Dreyer – freshman (6'8, 286) OT; 77 Casey Tucker – sophomore (6'6, 305) OT; 78 Kyle Murphy – senior (6'7, 272) OT	Tight ends: 9 Dalton Schultz – sophomore (6'6, 239); 18 Austin Hooper – (redshirt) sophomore (6'4, 225); 80 Eric Cotton – (redshirt) sophomore (6'6, 235); 82 Chris Harrell – senior (6'4, 236); 87 Ben Snyder – freshman (6'4, 240); 88 Greg Taboada – (redshirt) sophomore (6'5, 235); 99 Luke Kaumatule – senior (6'7, 260); Centers: 52 Graham Shuler – (redshirt) junior (6'4, 277); 64 Brian Chaffin – freshman (6'2, 278); 73 Jesse Burkett – (redshirt) freshman (6'4, 288); Defensive tackles: 58 David Parry – (redshirt) senior; 79 Alex Yazdi – (redshirt) junior; 95 Lance Callihan – (redshirt) junior; Defensive ends: 7 Aziz Shittu – senior (6'3, 275); 17 Brennan Scarlett – (redshirt) senior (6'4, 265); 48 Kevin Anderson – (redshirt) senior (6'4, 245); 55 Nate Lohn – (redshirt) junior (6'3, 274); 56 Wesley Annan – freshman (6'4, 285); 66 Harrison Phillips – sophomore (6'4, 255); 75 Jordan Watkins – (redshirt) junior (6'5, 271); 90 Solomon Thomas – sophomore (6'3, 256); 97 Dylan Jackson – Freshman (6'6, 248); Linebackers: 3 Noor Davis – (redshirt) junior (6'4, 227) ILB; 4 Blake Martinez – senior (6'2, 238) ILB; 15 Jordan Perez – (redshirt) freshman (6'2, 207) ILB; 20 Bobby Okereke – (redshirt) freshman (6'3, 217) ILB; 27 Sean Barton – freshman (6'3, 212) ILB; 31 Mustafa Branch – freshman (5'11, 218) ILB; 32 Joey Alfieri – (redshirt) freshman (6'3, 228) OLB; 33 Mike Tyler – (redshirt) sophomore (6'5, 225) OLB; 34 Peter Kalambayi – (redshirt) sophomore (6'3, 240) OLB; 43 Ryan Beecher– freshman (6'1, 230) ILB; 44 Kevin Palma – (redshirt) sophomore (6'2, 240) ILB; 47 Sam Yules – (redshirt) junior (6'2, 221) ILB; 49 Lewis Burik– freshman (5'10, 216) ILB; 50 Sam Shober– (redshirt) junior (6'3, 223) OLB; 52 Casey Toohill – freshman (6'4, 230) OLB; 53 Torsten Rotto – (redshirt) senior (6'2, 240) OLB; 59 Craig Jones – (redshirt) junior (6'0, 215) ILB; 86 Lane Veach – (redshirt) freshman (6'6, 233) OLB	Defensive backs: 8 Frank Buncom – freshman (6'2, 192) CB; 11 Terrence Alexander – sophomore (5'10, 178) CB; 13 Alijah Holder – (redshirt) freshman (6'2, 174) CB; 21 Ronnie Harris – (redshirt) senior (5'10, 170) CB; 23 Alameen Murphy – (redshirt) freshman (5'11, 185) CB; 24 Quenton Meeks – freshman (6'2, 195) CB; 38 Ra'Chard Pippens – (redshirt) senior (6'2, 198) CB; Safeties: 2 Brandon Simmons – (redshirt) freshman (6'0, 182) FS; 9 Ben Edwards – freshman (6'0, 191) FS; 22 Justin Reid – junior (6'1, 195) SS; 28 Denzel Franklin – (redshirt) sophomore (6'0, 198) SS; 29 Dallas Lloyd – (redshirt) junior (6'3, 209) SS; 45 Calvin Chandler – (redshirt) sophomore (6'2, 215) SS; Punters/Kickers: 14 Jake Bailey – freshman (6'2 186) P; 27 Charlie Beall – freshman (6'2 215) K; 34 Conrad Ukropina – (redshirt) junior (6'1 185) K; 47 Alex Robinson – (redshirt) sophomore (6'0 200) P; Long snappers: 67 Reed Miller – senior (6'2, 222); 68 C.J. Keller – sophomore (6'3, 215); Terms: Freshman – A player in his first year.; Sophomore – A player in his second year.; Junior – A player in his third year.; Senior – A player in his fourth year.; Redshirt – A player who sat out a previous season.
Source: 2015 Stanford Cardinal Football Roster

== Schedule ==
Date	Time	Opponent	Rank	Site	TV	Result	Attendance	Source
September 5	9:00 a.m.	at Northwestern*	No. 21	Ryan Field; Evanston, IL	ESPN	L 6–16	36,024	
September 12	7:30 p.m.	UCF*		Stanford Stadium; Stanford, CA	FS1	W 31–7	50,420	
September 19	5:00 p.m.	at No. 6 USC		Los Angeles Memorial Coliseum; Los Angeles, CA (rivalry)	ABC	W 41–31	78,306	
September 25	7:00 p.m.	at Oregon State	No. 21	Reser Stadium; Corvallis, OR	FS1	W 42–24	37,302	
October 3	7:30 p.m.	Arizona	No. 18	Stanford Stadium; Stanford, CA	P12N	W 55–17	46,628	
October 15	7:30 p.m.	No. 18 UCLA	No. 15	Stanford Stadium; Stanford, CA (rivalry)	ESPN	W 56–35	50,464	
October 24	7:30 p.m.	Washington^{†}	No. 10	Stanford Stadium; Stanford, CA	ESPN	W 31–14	50,424	
October 31	7:30 p.m.	at Washington State	No. 8	Martin Stadium; Pullman, WA	ESPN	W 30–28	30,012	
November 7	10:00 a.m.	at Colorado	No. 11	Folsom Field; Boulder, CO	P12N	W 42–10	40,142	
November 14	4:30 p.m.	Oregon	No. 7	Stanford Stadium; Stanford, CA (rivalry)	FOX	L 36–38	48,633	
November 21	7:30 p.m.	California	No. 11	Stanford Stadium; Stanford, CA (Big Game)	ESPN	W 35–22	51,424	
November 28	4:30 p.m.	No. 6 Notre Dame*	No. 9	Stanford Stadium; Stanford, CA (rivalry)	FOX	W 38–36	51,424	
December 5	4:45 p.m.	vs. No. 20 USC	No. 7	Levi's Stadium; Santa Clara, CA (Pac-12 Championship Game)	ESPN	W 41–22	58,476	
January 1, 2016	2:10 p.m.	vs. No. 5 Iowa*	No. 6	Rose Bowl; Pasadena, CA (Rose Bowl, College GameDay)	ESPN	W 45–16	94,268	
*Non-conference game; ^{†}Homecoming; Rankings from AP Poll and CFP Rankings after November 3 released prior to game; All times are in Pacific time

== Game summaries ==
=== At Northwestern ===
	1	2	3	4	Total
#21 Cardinal	3	0	0	3	6
Wildcats	3	7	0	6	16

=== UCF ===
	1	2	3	4	Total
Knights	0	0	0	7	7
Cardinal	0	10	7	14	31

=== At #6 USC ===
	1	2	3	4	Total
Cardinal	7	17	7	10	41
#6 Trojans	14	7	7	3	31

=== At Oregon State ===
	1	2	3	4	Total
#21 Cardinal	14	7	14	7	42
Beavers	7	6	0	7	20

=== Arizona ===
	1	2	3	4	Total
Wildcats	0	3	14	0	17
#18 Cardinal	13	14	21	7	55

=== #18 UCLA ===
	1	2	3	4	Total
#18 Bruins	10	7	3	15	35
#15 Cardinal	14	21	21	0	56

=== Washington ===
	1	2	3	4	Total
Huskies	0	0	7	7	14
#10 Cardinal	7	10	14	0	31

=== At Washington State ===
	1	2	3	4	Total
#8 Cardinal	3	0	17	10	30
Cougars	3	9	10	6	28

=== At Colorado ===
	1	2	3	4	Total
#9 Cardinal	7	21	7	7	42
Buffaloes	7	0	3	0	10

=== Oregon ===
	1	2	3	4	Total
Ducks	14	7	14	3	38
#7 Cardinal	10	13	0	13	36

=== California ===
	1	2	3	4	Total
Golden Bears	3	3	10	6	22
#15 Cardinal	7	14	0	14	35

=== No. 4 Notre Dame ===
	1	2	3	4	Total
#4 Fighting Irish	7	13	9	7	36
#13 Cardinal	14	7	7	10	38

In arguably one of the best college football games of the year, a game that had ten lead changes and almost 1,000 yards of offense, Stanford scored five touchdowns in five red zone trips, but it would be Stanford Kicker Conrad Ukropina who hit the game-winning field goal as time expired, which also ended Notre Dame's College Football Playoff hopes while keeping Stanford's playoff hopes alive. With 6:48 left in the game and the Cardinal leading 35–29, the Irish would march 88 yards in 15 plays (using up 6:18 of the play clock). It was capped off by Notre Dame Quarterback DeShone Kizer's two-yard touchdown run to give the Irish the lead with just 30 seconds left in the game. But the Irish defense could not hold as Stanford would go 45 yards in just 28 seconds and finish off the game with the win from Ukropina's field goal.

=== Vs. #24 USC (Pac-12 Championship) ===
	1	2	3	4	Total
#24 Trojans	0	3	13	6	22
#7 Cardinal	3	10	14	14	41

=== Vs. #6 Iowa (Rose Bowl) ===
	1	2	3	4	Total
#5 Cardinal	21	14	3	7	45
#6 Hawkeyes	0	0	3	13	16

Sports analysts had anticipated the contest to be exciting, due mainly to the matchup between Iowa's strong run defense and Stanford running back Christian McCaffrey, the Heisman Trophy runner-up. McCaffrey led the FBS in the 2015 season with 3,864 all-purpose yards, which came from punt/kick returns, runs from scrimmage, and passes out of the backfield. In contrast, Iowa's run defense finished the season ranked 14th, allowing only 121 yards per game and having defeated historically rushing teams like Wisconsin, Indiana, and Nebraska.

McCaffrey caught a short pass and turned it into a 75-yard touchdown on the first play from scrimmage. The Hawkeyes were unable to stop him, as he averaged 9.6 YPC (172 yards on 18 carries), returned a punt for a touchdown, and converted many third downs. Though he did not rush for any touchdowns from scrimmage, he proved to be the primary playmaker for Stanford, catching a third of Cardinal Quarterback Kevin Hogan's twelve passes. McCaffrey was such an offensive threat that Hogan was able to make large gains with the read option, including a wide-open first-quarter option TD run.

Stanford's 21-0 first-quarter lead was the most first-quarter points scored by one team in Rose Bowl history. Stanford shut Iowa out in the first half 35–0, with Stanford's 35 points the most scored in the first half of a Rose Bowl in its entire 102-year history. McCaffrey gained a total of 368 all-purpose yards, setting another Rose Bowl record.

Iowa was unable to get their run game going, rushing as a team for 1.3 YPC (48 yards on 38 carries). The longest Iowa runs were 14 and 12 yards, as well as a 14-yard scramble by Quarterback C. J. Beathard. Iowa's inability to establish a run game closed up Iowa's potential for play-action passing, which had been Beathard's bread and butter all season. Iowa's halfbacks, their biggest threat all season, were overall unable to garner any significant yardage on the ground.

By the second half, Stanford's explosiveness slowed down, scoring just 10 second-half points versus their 35 first-half points. Iowa did not score until the 3rd quarter when placekicker Marshall Koehn kicked a field goal after converting on 4th down earlier in the drive; Beathard threw 2 touchdowns in the 4th quarter, with Koehn missing one of the two PATs.

Iowa had a slight advantage in time of possession, possessing the ball for almost 33 minutes, though they were simply unable to make meaning out of their possessions. Iowa also outgained Stanford through the air by a slim margin, with 239 yards to Stanford's 223.

== Rankings ==
Ranking movements Legend: ██ Increase in ranking ██ Decrease in ranking — = Not ranked RV = Received votes
	Week															
Poll	Pre	1	2	3	4	5	6	7	8	9	10	11	12	13	14	Final
AP	21	RV	RV	21	18	16	15	10	8	9	7	15	13	7	5	3
Coaches	21	RV	—	24	20	18	16	11	8	8	7	15	12	7	6	3
CFP	Not released									11	7	11	9	7	6	Not released

== Statistics ==
=== Team ===
Team statistics
	Stanford	Opponents
Scoring	529	316
Points Per game	37.8	22.6
Points Off Turnovers	96	60
First Downs	311	267
Rushing	155	106
Passing	129	145
Penalty	27	16
Rushing yardage	3132	1958
Yards gained rushing	3358	2358
Yards lost rushing	226	400
Rushing attempts	610	453
Average Per rush	5.1	4.3
Average Per game	223.7	139.9
TDs Rushing	33	16
Passing yardage	2965	3198
Comp-Att-Int	213-318-8	271–473–8
Average Per Pass	9.3	6.8
Average Per Catch	13.9	11.8
Average Per game	211.8	228.4
TDs Passing	30	19
Total offense	6097	5156
Total play	928	926
Average Per play	6.6	5.6
Average Per game	435.5	368.3
Kick returns: # – yards	51-1265	70-1473
Punt returns: # – yards	17-154	11-93
INT Returns: # – yards	8-125	8-101
Kick Return Average	24.8	21.0
Punt Return Average	9.1	8.5
INT Return Average	15.6	12.6
Fumbles lost	12-5	10-6
Penalties – yards	78-648	80-742
Average Per game	46.3	53.0
Punts – yards	48-1959	66-2797
Average Per punt	40.8	42.4
Net punt average	37.2	39.1
Kickoffs – yards	96-5900	69-4003
Average Per kick	61.5	58.0
Net kick average	41.4	34.2
Time of possession/game	34:48	25:12
3rd-down conversions	91/182	70/193
3rd-Down Pct	50%	36%
4th-down conversions	13/16	15/24
4th-Down Pct	81%	62%
Sacks By – yards	34-260	20-104
Miscellaneous Yards	0	0
Touchdowns scored	68	36
Field goals – attempts	18-20	23-26
On-Side Kicks	0-1	0-3
Red-Zone Scores	(54–62) 87%	(41–47) 87%
Red-Zone Touchdowns	(41–62) 66%	(21–47) 45%
PAT – attempts	(67-67) 100%	(29–31) 94%
Attendance	349,381	221,786
Games/Avg Per game	7/49,912	5/44,357
Neutral Site Games		2/76,372

All opponents

	1	2	3	4	Total
Stanford	123	158	132	116	529
All opponents	68	69	93	86	316

Pac-12 opponents

	1	2	3	4	Total
Stanford	85	127	115	82	409
Pac-12 opponents	57	49	81	53	240

Non-conference opponents

	1	2	3	4	Total
Stanford	38	31	17	34	120
Non-conference opponents	11	20	12	33	76

== Players drafted into the NFL ==
Round	Pick	Player	Position	NFL club
1	28	Joshua Garnett	G	San Francisco 49ers
3	81	Austin Hooper	TE	Atlanta Falcons
4	131	Blake Martinez	LB	Green Bay Packers
5	162	Kevin Hogan	QB	Kansas City Chiefs
6	200	Kyle Murphy	OT	Green Bay Packers
