= 2015 Pac-12 Conference football season =

American college football season

- League: NCAA Division I FBS (Football Bowl Subdivision)
- Sport: American football
- Teams: 12
- TV partner(s): Fox Sports Media Group (Fox, FS1), ESPN Family (ABC, ESPN, ESPN2, ESPNU), and Pac-12 Networks

2016 NFL Draft
- Top draft pick: QB Jared Goff, California
- Picked by: Los Angeles Rams, 1st overall

Regular season
- North champions: Stanford Cardinal
- North runners-up: Oregon Ducks
- South champions: USC Trojans; Utah Utes
- South runners-up: UCLA Bruins

Pac-12 Championship
- Champions: Stanford Cardinal
- Runners-up: USC Trojans
- Finals MVP: Christian McCaffrey, RB

Football seasons
- 2014 2016

2015 Pac-12 Conference football standings
	Conf.			Overall
Team	W		L	W		L
North Division
No. 3 Stanford xy$	8	–	1	12	–	2
No. 19 Oregon	7	–	2	9	–	4
Washington State	6	–	3	9	–	4
California	4	–	5	8	–	5
Washington	4	–	5	7	–	6
Oregon State	0	–	9	2	–	10
South Division
USC xy	6	–	3	8	–	6
No. 17 Utah x	6	–	3	10	–	3
UCLA	5	–	4	8	–	5
Arizona State	4	–	5	6	–	7
Arizona	3	–	6	7	–	6
Colorado	1	–	8	4	–	9
Championship: Stanford 41, USC 22
$ – Conference champion; x – Division champion/co-champions; y – Championship game participant; Rankings from AP Poll

The 2015 Pac-12 Conference football season was the fifth season for the conference as a twelve-team league. The season began on September 3, 2015, with a trio of games, Arizona hosting UTSA, Utah hosting Michigan, and Hawaii hosting Colorado. The final game was the Pac-12 Championship Game at Levi's Stadium on December 5, 2015, with ESPN televising the game.

== Preseason ==
2015 Pac-12 Spring Football and number of signees on signing day:

North Division

- California: March 9 – April 18 with 24 signees
- Oregon: March 31 – May 2 with 22 signees
- Oregon State: March 3 – April 18 with 22 signees
- Stanford: February 23 – April 11 with 22 signees
- Washington: March 30 – April 25 with 24 signees
- Washington State: March 12 – April 28 with 24 signees

South Division

- Arizona: March 4 – April 10 with 25 signees
- Arizona State: March 16 – April 10 with 22 signees
- Colorado: February 13 – March 15 with 19 signees
- UCLA: March 31 – April 25, 2015 with 18 signees
- USC: March 3 – April 11 with 24 signees
- Utah: March 24 – April 25 with 20 signees

=== Pac-12 Media ===
2015 Pac-12 Media Day was held at Warner Bros. in Burbank, California on July 30–31, 2015.

==== Preseason polls ====
North Division

1. Oregon (37), 262 pts
2. Stanford (8), 232 pts
3. California, 174 pts
4. Washington, 129 pts
5. Washington State, 89 pts
6. Oregon State, 60 pts

South Division

1. USC (32), 254 pts
2. Arizona State (7), 200 pts
3. UCLA (6), 180 pts
4. Arizona, 155 pts
5. Utah, 105 pts
6. Colorado, 46 pts

- Predicted Pac-12 Championship Game Winner: USC (21) was picked to win the Pac-12 Championship over Oregon (17) for the first time since 2012. Others receiving votes were ASU (3), UCLA (2), and Stanford (1).

=== Recruiting classes ===
Rankings
Team	ESPN	Rivals	Scout	24/7	Signees
Arizona	39	41	41	42	25
Arizona State	26	20	17	19	22
California	-	29	36	34	24
Colorado	-	71	75	69	19
Oregon	15	17	21	16	22
Oregon State	-	71	63	60	22
Stanford	27	18	25	24	22
UCLA	11	13	9	12	18
USC	3	1	1	2	26
Utah	-	41	53	45	20
Washington	28	30	23	27	24
Washington State	-	55	38	41	24

== Head coaches ==
=== Coaching changes ===
There were one coaching change following the 2015 season including Gary Andersen with Oregon State.

=== Coaches ===
Team	Head coach	Years at school	Overall record	Record at school	Pac-12 record
Arizona	Rich Rodriguez	4	146–98–2	26–14	15–12
Arizona State	Todd Graham	4	77–41	28–12	19–8
California	Sonny Dykes	3	28–33	6–18	3–15
Colorado	Mike MacIntyre	3	22–39	6–18	1–17
Oregon	Mark Helfrich	3	24–4	24–4	15–3
Oregon State	Gary Andersen	1	49–38	0–0	0–0
Stanford	David Shaw	5	42–12	42–12	28–8
UCLA	Jim L. Mora	4	29–11	29–11	18–9
USC	Steve Sarkisian	2	43–33	9–4	30–24
Utah	Kyle Whittingham	11	85–33	85–33	14–22
Washington	Chris Petersen	2	100–18	8–6	4–5
Washington State	Mike Leach	3	96–68	12–20	7–20

Note: Stats shown are before the beginning of the season

== Rankings ==
	Increase in ranking
	Decrease in ranking
	Not ranked previous week
	Selected for College Football Playoff
(Italics)	Number of first place votes
т	Tied with team above or below also with this symbol

		Pre	Wk 2	Wk 3	Wk 4	Wk 5	Wk 6	Wk 7	Wk 8	Wk 9	Wk 10	Wk 11	Wk 12	Wk 13	Wk 14	Final
Arizona Wildcats	AP	22	22	20	16	RV		RV								
Arizona Wildcats	C	22	20	19	16	RV	RV	RV	RV							
Arizona Wildcats	CFP	Not released														
Arizona State Sun Devils	AP	15	RV	RV	RV		RV		RV							
Arizona State Sun Devils	C	16	RV	RV	RV		RV	RV								
Arizona State Sun Devils	CFP	Not released														
California Golden Bears	AP	RV	RV	RV	RV	24	23	23	20	RV	RV					
California Golden Bears	C		RV	RV	RV	24	22	23	19	RV						
California Golden Bears	CFP	Not released														
Colorado Buffaloes	AP															
Colorado Buffaloes	C															
Colorado Buffaloes	CFP	Not released														
Oregon Ducks	AP	7	7	12	13	RV	RV						23	18	15	19
Oregon Ducks	C	5	5	13	13	24	RV			RV	RV	RV	22	18	16	20
Oregon Ducks	CFP	Not released											23	17	15	
Oregon State Beavers	AP															
Oregon State Beavers	C															
Oregon State Beavers	CFP	Not released														
Stanford Cardinal	AP	21	RV	RV	21	18	16	15	10	8	9	7	15	13	7	3
Stanford Cardinal	C	21	RV		24	20	18	16	11	8	8	7	15	12	7	3
Stanford Cardinal	CFP	Not released									11	7	11	9	6	
UCLA Bruins	AP	13	13	10	9	7	20	18	RV	24	22	18	RV	22	RV	
UCLA Bruins	C	14	13	12	11	10	20	18	RV	25	22	18	RV	23	RV	
UCLA Bruins	CFP	Not released									23	19		22		
USC Trojans	AP	8	8	6	19	17	17	RV		RV	RV	RV	22	RV	24	RV
USC Trojans	C	10	10	7	18	16	17	RV		RV	RV	RV	24	RV	24	RV
USC Trojans	CFP	Not released											24	20	25	
Utah Utes	AP	RV	24	21	18	10	5	4	3	13	13	10	18	RV	21	17
Utah Utes	C	RV	25	21	17	12	7	7	7	14	14	13	18	25	20	16
Utah Utes	CFP	Not released									12	10	13	23	22	
Washington Huskies	AP															
Washington Huskies	C	RV						RV								
Washington Huskies	CFP	Not released														
Washington State Cougars	AP									RV	RV	RV	24	20	RV	RV
Washington State Cougars	C								RV	RV	RV	RV	23	20	RV	RV
Washington State Cougars	CFP	Not released												20		

== Schedule ==
Index to colors and formatting
Pac-12 member won
Pac-12 member lost
Pac-12 teams in **bold**

All times Mountain time. Pac-12 teams in bold.

Rankings reflect those of the AP poll for that week.

=== Week 1 ===
Date	Time	Visiting team	Home team	Site	TV	Result	Attendance	Ref.
Thursday, September 3	5:30 p.m.	Michigan	**Utah**	Rice-Eccles Stadium • Salt Lake City, UT	FS1	**W** 24–17	47,825	
Thursday, September 3	7:00 p.m.	UTSA	No. 22 **Arizona**	Arizona Stadium • Tucson, AZ	P12N	**W** 42–32	51,111	
Thursday, September 3	10:00 p.m.	**Colorado**	Hawaii	Aloha Stadium • Honolulu, HI	CBSSN	**L** 20–28	24,255	
Friday, September 4	5:00 p.m.	Weber State	**Oregon State**	Reser Stadium • Corvallis, OR	P12N	**W** 26–7	35,160	
Friday, September 4	7:15 p.m.	**Washington**	No. 23 Boise State	Albertsons Stadium • Boise, ID	ESPN	**L** 13–16	36,836	
Saturday, September 5	9:00 a.m.	No. 21 **Stanford**	Northwestern	Ryan Field • Evanston, IL	ESPN	**L** 6–16	36,024	
Saturday, September 5	11:00 a.m.	Portland State	**Washington State**	Martin Stadium • Pullman, WA	P12N	**L** 17–24	24,302	
Saturday, September 5	12:30 p.m.	Virginia	No. 13 **UCLA**	Rose Bowl • Pasadena, CA	FOX	**W** 34–16	68,615	
Saturday, September 5	2:00 p.m.	Grambling State	**California**	California Memorial Stadium • Berkeley, CA	P12N	**W** 73–14	60,606	
Saturday, September 5	4:00 p.m.	No. 15 **Arizona State**	Texas A&M	Reliant Stadium • Houston, TX	ESPN	**L** 17–38	66,308	
Saturday, September 5	5:00 p.m.	Eastern Washington	No. 7 **Oregon**	Autzen Stadium • Eugene, OR	P12N	**W** 61–42	58,128	
Saturday, September 5	8:00 p.m.	Arkansas State	No. 8 **USC**	Los Angeles Memorial Coliseum • Los Angeles, CA	P12N	**W** 55–6	79,809	
^{#}Rankings from AP Poll released prior to game. All times are in Pacific Time.

Players of the Week - September 7

Offensive		Defensive		Special teams	
Player	Team	Player	Team	Player	Team
Josh Rosen	UCLA	Justin Thomas	Utah	Dante Pettis	Washington

=== Week 2 ===
Date	Time	Visiting team	Home team	Site	TV	Result	Attendance	Ref.
Friday, September 11	6:00 p.m.	Utah State	No. 24 **Utah**	Rice-Eccles Stadium • Salt Lake City, UT	ESPN2	**W** 24–14	46,011	
Saturday, September 12	9:00 a.m.	**Oregon State**	Michigan	Michigan Stadium • Ann Arbor, MI	ABC	**L** 7–35	109,651	
Saturday, September 12	11:00 a.m.	Sacramento State	**Washington**	Husky Stadium • Seattle, WA	P12N	**W** 49–0	55,010	
Saturday, September 12	11:00 a.m.	UMass	**Colorado**	Folsom Field • Boulder, CO	P12N	**W** 48–14	35,094	
Saturday, September 12	12:30 p.m.	**Washington State**	Rutgers	High Point Solutions Stadium • Piscataway, NJ	ESPNU	**W** 37–34	46,536	
Saturday, September 12	2:00 p.m.	San Diego State	**California**	California Memorial Stadium • Berkeley, CA	P12N	**W** 35–7	50,830	
Saturday, September 12	4:00 p.m.	No. 22 **Arizona**	Nevada	Mackay Stadium • Reno, NV	CBSSN	**W** 44–20	24,355	
Saturday, September 12	5:00 p.m.	Idaho	No. 8 **USC**	Los Angeles Memorial Coliseum • Los Angeles, CA	P12N	**W** 59–9	72,422	
Saturday, September 12	5:00 p.m.	No. 7 **Oregon**	No. 5 Michigan State	Spartan Stadium • East Lansing, MI	ABC	**L** 28–31	76,526	
Saturday, September 12	7:30 p.m.	UCF	**Stanford**	Stanford Stadium • Stanford	FS1	**W** 31–0	50,420	
Saturday, September 12	7:30 p.m.	No. 13 **UCLA**	UNLV	Sam Boyd Stadium • Las Vegas, NV	CBSSN	**W** 37–3	31,262	
Saturday, September 12	8:00 p.m.	Cal Poly	**Arizona State**	Sun Devil Stadium • Tempe, AZ	P12N	**W** 35–21	46,500	
^{#}Rankings from AP Poll released prior to game. All times are in Pacific Time.

Players of the Week- September 14

Offensive		Defensive		Special teams	
Player	Team	Player	Team	Player	Team
Luke Falk	Washington State	Gionni Paul	Utah	Bralon Addison	Oregon

=== Week 3 ===
Date	Time	Visiting team	Home team	Site	TV	Result	Attendance	Ref.
Friday, September 18	7:00 p.m.	New Mexico	**Arizona State**	Sun Devil Stadium • Tempe, AZ	P12N	**W** 34–10	43,310	
Saturday, September 19	11:00 a.m.	Georgia State	No. 12 **Oregon**	Autzen Stadium • Eugene, OR	P12N	**W** 61–28	56,859	
Saturday, September 19	2:00 p.m.	Utah State	**Washington**	Husky Stadium • Seattle, WA	P12N	**W** 31–17	59,464	
Saturday, September 19	4:00 p.m.	**Colorado**	Colorado State	Sports Authority Field at Mile High • Denver, CO	CBSSN	**W** 27–24 ^{OT}	76,125	
Saturday, September 19	4:30 p.m.	**California**	Texas	Darrell K Royal–Texas Memorial Stadium • Austin, TX	FOX	**W** 45–44	91,568	
Saturday, September 19	5:00 p.m.	**Stanford**	No. 6 **USC**	Los Angeles Memorial Coliseum • Los Angeles, CA	ABC	**STAN** 41–31	78,306	
Saturday, September 19	5:00 p.m.	San Jose State	**Oregon State**	Reser Stadium • Corvallis, OR	P12N	**W** 35–21	34,573	
Saturday, September 19	5:30 p.m.	Wyoming	**Washington State**	Martin Stadium • Pullman, WA	P12N	**W** 31–14	31,105	
Saturday, September 19	7:30 p.m.	No. 21 **Utah**	Fresno State	Bulldog Stadium • Fresno, CA	CBSSN	**W** 45–24	33,675	
Saturday, September 19	7:30 p.m.	No. 19 BYU	No. 10 **UCLA**	Rose Bowl • Pasadena, CA	FS1	**W** 24–23	67,612	
Saturday, September 19	8:00 p.m.	Northern Arizona	No. 20 **Arizona**	Arizona Stadium • Tucson, AZ	P12N	**W** 77–13	51,494	
^{#}Rankings from AP Poll released prior to game. All times are in Pacific Time.

Players of the Week - September 21

Offensive		Defensive		Special teams	
Player	Team	Player	Team	Player	Team
Kevin Hogan	Stanford	Kenneth Olugbode	Colorado	Cory Butler-Byrd	Utah

=== Week 4 ===
Date	Time	Visiting team	Home team	Site	TV	Result	Attendance	Ref.
Friday, September 25	7:00 p.m.	No. 21 **Stanford**	**Oregon State**	Reser Stadium • Corvallis, OR	FS1	**STAN** 42–24	37,302	
Saturday, September 26	11:00 am	Nicholls State	**Colorado**	Folsom Field • Boulder, CO	P12N	**W** 48–0	37,302	
Saturday, September 26	3:00 pm	**California**	**Washington**	Husky Stadium • Seattle, WA	P12N	**CAL** 30–24	61,066	
Saturday, September 26	8:00 pm	No. 9 **UCLA**	No. 16 **Arizona**	Arizona Stadium • Tucson, AZ	ABC	**UCLA** 56–30	56,004	
Saturday, September 26	10:30 pm	No. 18 **Utah**	No. 13 **Oregon**	Autzen Stadium • Eugene, OR	FOX	**UTAH** 62–20	57,145	
Saturday, September 26	11:30 pm	No. 19 **USC**	**Arizona State**	Sun Devil Stadium • Tempe, AZ	ESPN	**USC** 42–14	61,904	
^{#}Rankings from AP Poll released prior to game. All times are in Pacific Time.

Players of the Week - September 28

Offensive		Defensive		Special teams	
Player	Team	Player	Team	Player	Team
Travis Wilson	Utah	Kyle Kragen	California	Tom Hackett	Utah

=== Week 5 ===
Date	Time	Visiting team	Home team	Site	TV	Result	Attendance	Ref.
Saturday, October 3	1:00 p.m.	**Washington State**	No. 24 **California**	California Memorial Stadium • Berkeley, CA	P12N	**CAL** 34–28	42,042	
Saturday, October 3	4:30 p.m.	**Arizona State**	No. 7 **UCLA**	Rose Bowl • Pasadena, CA	FOX	**ASU** 38–23	80,113	
Saturday, October 3	7:00 p.m.	**Oregon**	**Colorado**	Folsom Field • Boulder, CO	ESPN	**ORE** 41–24	46,222	
Saturday, October 3	7:30 p.m.	**Arizona**	No. 18 **Stanford**	Stanford Stadium • Stanford, CA	P12N	**STAN** 55–17	46,628	
^{#}Rankings from AP Poll released prior to game. All times are in Pacific Time.

Players of the Week - October 5

Offensive		Defensive		Special teams	
Player	Team	Player	Team	Player	Team
Mike Bercovici	Arizona State	Stefan McClure	California	Matt Haack	Arizona State

=== Week 6 ===
Date	Time	Visiting team	Home team	Site	TV	Result	Attendance	Ref.
Thursday, October 8	6:00 p.m.	**Washington**	No. 17 **USC**	Los Angeles Memorial Coliseum • Los Angeles, CA	ESPN	**WASH** 17–12	63,623	
Saturday, October 10	1:00 p.m.	**Oregon State**	**Arizona**	Arizona Stadium • Tucson, AZ	FS1	**ARZ** 44–7	52,987	
Saturday, October 10	3:00 p.m.	**Washington State**	**Oregon**	Autzen Stadium • Eugene, OR	P12N	**WSU** 45–38 ^{2OT}	57,775	
Saturday, October 10	7:00 p.m.	No. 23 **California**	No. 5 **Utah**	Rice-Eccles Stadium • Salt Lake City, UT	ESPN	**UTAH** 30–24	47,798	
Saturday, October 10	7:00 p.m.	**Colorado**	**Arizona State**	Sun Devil Stadium • Tempe, AZ	P12N	**ASU** 48–23	44,157	
^{#}Rankings from AP Poll released prior to game. All times are in Pacific Time.

Players of the Week - October 12

Offensive		Defensive		Special teams	
Player	Team	Player	Team	Player	Team
Devontae Booker	Utah	Travis Feeney	Washington	Tom Hackett	Utah

=== Week 7 ===
Date	Time	Visiting team	Home team	Site	TV	Result	Attendance	Ref.
Thursday, October 15	7:30 p.m.	No. 18 **UCLA**	No. 15 **Stanford**	Stanford Stadium • Stanford, CA	ESPN	**STAN** 56–35	50,464	
Saturday, October 17	1:00 p.m.	**Oregon State**	**Washington State**	Martin Stadium • Pullman, WA	P12N	**WSU** 52–31	32,952	
Saturday, October 17	4:30 p.m.	**USC**	No. 14 Notre Dame	Notre Dame Stadium • South Bend, IN (Jeweled Shillelagh)	NBC	**L** 31–41	80,795	
Saturday, October 17	6:00 p.m.	**Arizona**	**Colorado**	Folsom Field • Boulder, CO	FS1	**ARZ** 38–31	39,666	
Saturday, October 17	7:00 p.m.	**Arizona State**	No. 4 **Utah**	Rice-Eccles Stadium • Salt Lake City, UT	ESPN	**UTAH** 34–18	46,192	
Saturday, October 17	7:30 p.m.	**Oregon**	**Washington**	Husky Stadium • Seattle, WA	ESPN2	**ORE** 26–20	69,285	
^{#}Rankings from AP Poll released prior to game. All times are in Pacific Time.

Players of the Week - October 19

Offensive		Defensive		Special teams	
Player	Team	Player	Team	Player	Team
Christian McCaffrey	Stanford	Shalom Luani	Washington State	Tim White	Arizona State

=== Week 8 ===
Date	Time	Visiting team	Home team	Site	TV	Result	Attendance	Ref.
Thursday, October 22	6:00 p.m.	No. 20 **California**	**UCLA**	Rose Bowl • Pasadena, CA	ESPN	**UCLA** 40–24	57,046	
Saturday, October 24	1:00 p.m.	**Washington State**	**Arizona**	Arizona Stadium • Tucson, AZ	P12N	**WSU** 45–42	47,847	
Saturday, October 24	4:30 p.m.	No. 3 **Utah**	**USC**	Los Angeles Memorial Coliseum • Los Angeles, CA	FOX	**USC** 42–24	73,435	
Saturday, October 24	7:30 p.m.	**Colorado**	**Oregon State**	Reser Stadium • Corvallis, OR	P12N	**COL** 17–13	36,977	
Saturday, October 24	7:30 p.m.	**Washington**	No. 10 **Stanford**	Stanford Stadium • Stanford, CA	ESPN	**STAN** 31–14	50,424	
^{#}Rankings from AP Poll released prior to game. All times are in Pacific Time.

Players of the Week - October 26

Offensive		Defensive		Special teams	
Player	Team	Player	Team	Player	Team
Luke Falk	Washington State	Cameron Smith	USC	Kaʻimi Fairbairn	UCLA

=== Week 9 ===
Date	Time	Visiting team	Home team	Site	TV	Result	Attendance	Ref.
Thursday, October 29	7:30 p.m.	**Oregon**	**Arizona State**	Sun Devil Stadium • Tempe, AZ	ESPN	**ORE** 61–55 ^{3OT}	56,534	
Saturday, October 31	12:00 p.m.	**Colorado**	No. 24 **UCLA**	Rose Bowl • Pasadena, CA	P12N	**UCLA** 35–31	51,508	
Saturday, October 31	12:00 p.m.	**USC**	**California**	California Memorial Stadium • Berkeley, CA	FOX	**USC** 27–21	52,060	
Saturday, October 31	4:00 p.m.	**Oregon State**	**Utah**	Rice-Eccles Stadium • Salt Lake City, UT	P12N	**UTAH** 27–12	45,853	
Saturday, October 31	7:30 p.m.	No. 8 **Stanford**	**Washington State**	Martin Stadium • Pullman, WA	ESPN	**STAN** 30–28	30,012	
Saturday, October 31	8:00 p.m.	**Arizona**	**Washington**	Husky Stadium • Seattle, WA	FS1	**WASH** 49–3	56,749	
^{#}Rankings from AP Poll released prior to game. All times are in Pacific Time.

Players of the Week - November 2

Offensive		Defensive		Special teams	
Player	Team	Player	Team	Player	Team
Vernon Adams	Oregon	Travis Feeney	Washington	Charles Nelson	Oregon

=== Week 10 ===
Date	Time	Visiting team	Home team	Site	TV	Result	Attendance	Ref.
Saturday, November 7	10:00 a.m.	No. 9 **Stanford**	Colorado	Folsom Field • Boulder, CO	P12N	**STAN** 42–10	40,142	
Saturday, November 7	12:30 p.m.	**Arizona State**	Washington State	Martin Stadium • Pullman, WA	FS1	**WSU** 38–24	32,952	
Saturday, November 7	1:30 p.m.	No. 22 **UCLA**	Oregon State	Reser Stadium • Corvallis, OR	P12N	**UCLA** 41–0	38,074	
Saturday, November 7	4:30 p.m.	No. 13 **Utah**	Washington	Husky Stadium • Seattle, WA	FOX	**UTAH** 34–23	61,420	
Saturday, November 7	7:30 p.m.	**Arizona**	USC	Los Angeles Memorial Coliseum • Los Angeles, CA	ESPN	**USC** 38–30	76,309	
Saturday, November 7	7:30 p.m.	**California**	Oregon	Autzen Stadium • Eugene, OR	ESPN2	**ORE** 44–28	56,604	
^{#}Rankings from AP Poll released prior to game. All times are in Pacific Time.

Players of the Week - November 9

Offensive		Defensive		Special teams	
Player	Team	Player	Team	Player	Team
Luke Falk	Washington State	Gionni Paul	Utah	Raymond Hudson	California

=== Week 11 ===
Date	Time	Visiting team	Home team	Site	TV	Result	Attendance	Ref.
Friday, November 13	6:00 p.m.	**USC**	**Colorado**	Folsom Field • Boulder, CO	ESPN2	**USC** 27–24	37,905	
Saturday, November 14	12:00 p.m.	**Washington**	**Arizona State**	Sun Devil Stadium • Tempe, AZ	P12N	**ASU** 27–17	51,695	
Saturday, November 14	4:30 p.m.	**Oregon**	No. 7 **Stanford**	Stanford Stadium • Stanford, CA	FOX	**ORE** 38–36	48,633	
Saturday, November 14	7:00 p.m.	No. 10 **Utah**	**Arizona**	Arizona Stadium • Tucson, AZ	FS1	**ARI** 37–30 ^{2OT}	48,912	
Saturday, November 14	7:30 p.m.	**Oregon State**	**California**	California Memorial Stadium • Berkeley, CA	P12N	**CAL** 54–24	41,874	
Saturday, November 14	7:45 p.m.	**Washington State**	No. 18 **UCLA**	Rose Bowl • Pasadena, CA	ESPN	**WSU** 31–27	76,255	
^{#}Rankings from AP Poll released prior to game. All times are in Pacific Time.

Players of the Week - November 16

Offensive		Defensive		Special teams	
Player	Team	Player	Team	Player	Team
Jared Goff	California	Antonio Longino	Arizona State	Casey Skowron	Arizona

=== Week 12 ===
Date	Time	Visiting team	Home team	Site	TV	Result	Attendance	Ref.
Saturday, November 21	12:30 p.m.	**UCLA**	No. 18 **Utah**	Rice-Eccles Stadium • Salt Lake City, UT	FOX	**UCLA** 17–9	46,230	
Saturday, November 21	12:30 p.m.	**Arizona**	**Arizona State**	Sun Devil Stadium • Tempe, AZ (Territorial Cup)	FS1	**ASU** 52–37	64,885	
Saturday, November 21	12:30 p.m.	No. 22 **USC**	No. 23 **Oregon**	Autzen Stadium • Eugene, OR	ESPN	**ORE** 48–28	59,094	
Saturday, November 21	3:00 p.m.	**Washington**	**Oregon State**	Reser Stadium • Corvallis, OR	P12N	**WASH** 52–7	34,390	
Saturday, November 21	7:30 p.m.	**California**	No. 15 **Stanford**	Stanford Stadium • Stanford, CA (Big Game)	ESPN	**STAN** 35–22	51,424	
Saturday, November 21	7:45 p.m.	**Colorado**	No. 24 **Washington State**	Martin Stadium • Pullman, WA	ESPN2	**WSU** 27–3	25,121	
^{#}Rankings from AP Poll released prior to game. All times are in Pacific Time.

Players of the Week - November 23

Offensive		Defensive		Special teams	
Player	Team	Player	Team	Player	Team
Vernon Adams Jr.	Oregon	Antonio Longino	Arizona State	Christian McCaffrey	Stanford

=== Week 13 ===
Date	Time	Visiting team	Home team	Site	TV	Result	Attendance	Ref.
Friday, November 27	12:30 p.m.	No. 20 **Washington State**	**Washington**	Husky Stadium • Seattle, WA (Apple Cup)	FOX	**WASH** 45–10	70,438	
Friday, November 27	1:00 p.m.	**Oregon State**	No. 18 **Oregon**	Autzen Stadium • Eugene, OR (Civil War)	FS1	**ORE** 52–42	57,814	
Saturday, November 28	11:30 a.m.	**Colorado**	**Utah**	Rice-Eccles Stadium • Salt Lake City, UT (Rumble in the Rockies)	P12N	**UTAH** 20–14	45,823	
Saturday, November 28	12:30 p.m.	No. 22 **UCLA**	**USC**	Los Angeles Memorial Coliseum • Los Angeles, CA (Victory Bell)	ABC/ESPN2	**USC** 40–21	83,602	
Saturday, November 28	4:30 p.m.	No. 4 Notre Dame	No. 13 **Stanford**	Stanford Stadium • Stanford, CA (Legends Trophy)	FOX	**W** 38–36	51,424	
Saturday, November 28	7:00 p.m.	**Arizona State**	**California**	California Memorial Stadium • Berkeley, CA	FS1	**CAL** 48–46	45,385	
^{#}Rankings from AP Poll released prior to game. All times are in Pacific Time.

Players of the Week - November 28

Offensive		Defensive		Special teams	
Player	Team	Player	Team	Player	Team
Jared Goff	California	Iman Marshall	USC	Conrad Ukropina	Stanford

=== Championship game ===
The championship game was played on December 5, 2015. It featured the teams with the best conference records from each division, Stanford from the North and USC from the South. This was the fifth championship game (and the fifth win for the North), with Stanford appearing for the third time (and winning for the third time) and USC appearing for the first time.

==== Week 14 (Pac-12 Championship Game) ====
Date	Time	Visiting team	Home team	Site	TV	Result	Attendance	Ref.
December 5	4:45 p.m.	No. 24 USC	No. 7 Stanford	Levi's Stadium • Santa Clara, CA (Pac-12 Championship)	ESPN	**STAN** 41–22	58,476	
^{#}Rankings from AP Poll released prior to game. All times are in Pacific Time.

=== Bowl games ===
Pac-12 team is bolded.

Bowl Game	Date	Stadium	City	TV	Time (PST)	Winning team	Score	Losing team	Score
New Mexico Bowl	Saturday, December 19, 2015	University Stadium	Albuquerque, New Mexico	ESPN	12:00 p.m.	**Arizona**	**45**	New Mexico	37
Las Vegas Bowl	Saturday, December 19, 2015	Sam Boyd Stadium	Whitney, Nevada	ABC	1:30 p.m.	**#20 Utah**	**35**	BYU	28
Sun Bowl	Saturday, December 26, 2015	Sun Bowl Stadium	El Paso, Texas	CBS	11:00 a.m.	**Washington State**	**20**	Miami (FL)	14
Heart of Dallas Bowl	Saturday, December 26, 2015	Cotton Bowl	Dallas, Texas	ESPN	11:20 a.m.	**Washington**	**44**	Southern Miss	31
Foster Farms Bowl	Monday, December 28, 2015	Levi's Stadium	Santa Clara, California	ESPN	6:15 p.m.	Nebraska	37	**UCLA**	**29**
Armed Forces Bowl	Tuesday, December 29, 2015	Amon G. Carter Stadium	Fort Worth, Texas	ESPN	11:00 a.m.	**California**	**55**	Air Force	36
Holiday Bowl	Wednesday, December 30, 2015	Qualcomm Stadium	San Diego, California	ESPN	7:30 p.m.	#23 Wisconsin	23	**USC**	**21**
Rose Bowl	Friday, January 1, 2016	Rose Bowl	Pasadena, California	ESPN	2:10 p.m.	**#5 Stanford**	**45**	#6 Iowa	16
Alamo Bowl	Saturday, January 2, 2016	Alamodome	San Antonio, Texas	ESPN	3:45 p.m.	#11 TCU	47	**#15 Oregon**	41^{3OT}
Cactus Bowl	Saturday, January 2, 2016	Chase Field	Phoenix, Arizona	ESPN	8:15 p.m.	**West Virginia**	**43**	Arizona State	42

== Pac-12 vs Power Conference matchups ==
This is a list of the power conference teams (ACC, Big Ten, Big 12 and SEC) the Pac-12 plays in the non-conference (Rankings from the AP Poll):

Date	Visitor	Home	Site	Significance	Score
September 3	Michigan	Utah	Rice-Eccles Stadium • Salt Lake City, Utah		UTAH W 24–17
September 5	Arizona State	Texas A&M	NRG Stadium • Houston, TX	Texas Kickoff	TAMU L 17–38
September 5	Stanford	Northwestern	Ryan Field • Evanston, IL		NW L 6–16
September 5	Virginia	UCLA	Rose Bowl • Pasadena, CA		UCLA W 34–16
September 12	Oregon State	Michigan	Michigan Stadium • Ann Arbor, MI		MICH L 7–35
September 12	Washington State	Rutgers	High Point Solutions Stadium • Piscataway, NJ		WSU W 37–34
September 12	Oregon	Michigan State	Spartan Stadium • East Lansing, MI		MSU L 28–31
September 19	California	Texas	Darrell K Royal–Texas Memorial Stadium • Austin, TX		CAL W 45–44

=== Records against other conferences ===
2015 records against non-conference foes:

Regular Season

Power 5 Conferences	Record
ACC	1–0
Big Ten	2–3
Big 12	1–0
SEC	0–1
Notre Dame	1–1
Power 5 Total	5–5
Other FBS Conferences	Record
American	1–0
C-USA	1–0
MAC	1–0
Mountain West	11–2
Independents (Excluding Notre Dame)	1–0
Sun Belt	3-0
Other FBS Total	18–2
FCS Opponents	Record
Football Championship Subdivision	7–1
Total Non-Conference Record	30–8

Post Season

Power Conferences 5	Record
ACC	1–0
Big Ten	1–2
Big 12	0–2
Power 5 Total	2–4
Other FBS Conferences	Record
C–USA	1–0
Independents (Excluding Notre Dame)	1–0
Mountain West	2–0
Other FBS Total	4–0
Total Bowl Record	6–4

== Awards and honors ==
AP College Football Player of the Year

- Christian McCaffrey, Stanford

Lou Groza Award

- Kaʻimi Fairbairn, UCLA

=== All-Americans ===
The following Pac-12 players were named to the 2015 College Football All-America Team by the Walter Camp Football Foundation (WCFF), Associated Press (AP), Football Writers Association of America (FWAA), Sporting News (SN), and American Football Coaches Association (AFCA):

First team

- Joshua Garnett, OL, Stanford (WCFF, AP, FWAA, SN, AFCA)
- Christian McCaffrey, RB, Stanford (SN, AFCA)
- Kaʻimi Fairbairn, K, UCLA (WCFF, AP, FWAA, AFCA)
- Tom Hackett, P, Utah (WCFF, AP, FWAA, SN, AFCA)
- Christian McCaffrey, All-purpose, Stanford (AP)
- Christian McCaffrey, KR, Stanford (FWAA)

Second team

- Tyler Johnstone, OL, Oregon (FWAA)
- Christian McCaffrey, RB, Stanford (WCFF)
- Royce Freeman, RB, Oregon (FWAA)
- JuJu Smith-Schuster, WR, USC (AP, FWAA, SN)
- DeForest Buckner, DE, Oregon (AP, FWAA)
- Kaʻimi Fairbairn, K, UCLA (SN)
- Christian McCaffrey, KR, Stanford (WCFF)
- Dante Pettis, PR, Washington (SN)

Third team

- Royce Freeman, RB, Oregon (AP)
- Austin Hooper TE, Stanford (AP)
- Kenny Clark, DT, UCLA (AP)
- Su'a Cravens, LB, USC (AP)
- Blake Martinez, LB, Stanford (AP)
- Aidan Schneider, K, Oregon (AP)

Academic All-America Team Member of the Year (CoSIDA)

=== Conference awards ===
The following individuals won the conference's annual player and coach awards:

- Offensive Player of the Year: Christian McCaffrey, Stanford
- Pat Tillman Defensive Player of the Year: DeForest Buckner, Oregon
- Offensive Freshman of the Year: Josh Rosen, UCLA
- Defensive Freshman of the Year: Cameron Smith, USC
- Coach of the Year: Mike Leach, Washington State; David Shaw, Stanford

=== All-Conference teams ===
The following players earned All-Pac-12 honors.

Offense:

First Team				Second Team		
Pos.	Name	Yr.	School	Name	Yr.	School
QB	Luke Falk	So.	Washington State	Kevin Hogan	Sr.	Stanford
QB	Jared Goff	Jr.	California	N/A	N/A	N/A
RB	Royce Freeman	So.	Oregon	Devontae Booker	Sr.	Utah
RB	Christian McCaffrey	So.	Stanford	Paul Perkins	Jr.	UCLA
WR	Kenny Lawler	Jr.	California	Bralon Addison	Jr.	Oregon
WR	Gabe Marks	Jr.	Washington State	Darren Carrington	So.	Oregon
WR	JuJu Smith-Schuster	So.	USC	Nelson Spruce	Sr.	Colorado
TE	Austin Hooper	Jr.	Stanford	Thomas Duarte	Jr.	UCLA
OL	Zach Banner	Jr.	USC	Jake Brendel	Sr.	UCLA
OL	Joe Dahl	Sr.	Washington State	J. J. Dielman	Jr.	Utah
OL	Joshua Garnett	Sr.	Stanford	Conor McDermott	Jr.	UCLA
OL	Tyler Johnstone	Sr.	Oregon	Christian Westerman	Sr.	Arizona State
OL	Kyle Murphy	Sr.	Stanford	Chad Wheeler	Jr.	USC

Defense:

First Team				Second Team		
Pos.	Name	Yr.	School	Name	Yr.	School
DL	DeForest Buckner	Sr.	Oregon	Darryl Paulo	Sr.	Washington State
DL	Kenny Clark	Jr.	UCLA	Delvon Simmons	Sr.	USC
DL	Lowell Lotulelei	So.	Utah	Taniela Tupou	Sr.	Washington
DL	Aziz Shittu	Sr.	Stanford	Destiny Vaeao	Sr.	Washington State
DL	Antwaun Woods	Sr.	USC	N/A	N/A	N/A
LB	Su'a Cravens	Jr.	USC	Travis Feeney	Sr.	Washington
LB	Blake Martinez	Sr.	Stanford	Deon Hollins	Jr.	UCLA
LB	Gionni Paul	Sr.	Utah	Jared Norris	Sr.	Utah
DB	Budda Baker	So.	Washington	Chidobe Awuzie	Jr.	Colorado
DB	Adoree’ Jackson	So.	USC	Randall Goforth	Jr.	UCLA
DB	Sidney Jones	So.	Washington	Ronnie Harris	Sr.	Stanford
DB	Marcus Williams	So.	Utah	Jaleel Wadood	So.	UCLA

Specialists:

First Team				Second Team		
Pos.	Name	Yr.	School	Name	Yr.	School
PK	Aidan Schneider	So.	Oregon	Kaʻimi Fairbairn	Sr.	UCLA
P	Tom Hackett	Sr.	Utah	Drew Riggleman	Sr.	Arizona
RS	Christian McCaffrey	So.	Stanford	Adoree’ Jackson	So.	USC
AP/ST	Charles Nelson	So.	Oregon	Soma Vainuku	Sr.	USC

=== All-Academic ===
First team

Pos.	Name	School	Yr.	GPA	Major

== Home game attendance ==
Team	Stadium	Capacity	Game 1	Game 2	Game 3	Game 4	Game 5	Game 6	Game 7	Total	Average	% of Capacity
Arizona	Arizona Stadium	56,029	51,111	51,494	56,004	52,987	47,847	48,912	—	308,355	51,393	91.72%
Arizona State	Sun Devil Stadium	64,248	46,500	43,310	61,904	44,157	56,534	51,695	**64,885**	368,985	52,712	82.04%
California	California Memorial Stadium	62,467	60,606	50,830	42,042	52,060	41,874		—	247,412	49,482	79.21%
Colorado	Folsom Field	53,613	35,094	37,302	46,222	39,666	40,142		—	198,426	39,685	74.02%
Oregon	Autzen Stadium	54,000	**58,128**	**56,859**	**57,145**	**57,775**	**56,604**	**59,094**		345,605	**57,601**	106.67%
Oregon State	Reser Stadium	45,674	35,160	34,573	37,302	36,977	38,074	34,390	—	216,476	36,079	78.99%
Stanford	Stanford Stadium	50,424	50,420	46,628	**50,464**	**50,424**	48,633	**51,424**		297,993	49,666	98.50%
UCLA	Rose Bowl	91,136	68,615	67,612	80,113	57,046	51,508	76,255	—	401,149	66,858	73.36%
USC	Los Angeles Memorial Coliseum	93,607	79,809	72,422	78,306	63,623	73,435	76,309		443,904	73,984	79.04%
Utah	Rice-Eccles Stadium	45,807	**47,825**	**46,011**	**47,798**	**46,192**	**45,853**	**46,230**		279,909	**46,652**	101.84%
Washington	Husky Stadium	70,083	55,010	59,464	61,066	69,285	50,667	61,420		356,912	59,485	84.88%
Washington State	Martin Stadium	32,952	24,302	31,105	**32,952**	30,012	**32,952**	25,121	—	176,444	29,407	89.24%

^A Game played at Levi's Stadium in Santa Clara, CA.
^B Game played at CenturyLink Field in Seattle, WA.
Bold – Exceed capacity
†Season High

== Notes ==
- October 12, 2015 – USC terminated Steve Sarkisian as its head football coach
- October 30, 2015 – USC Athletic Director Pat Haden resigned from the College Football Playoff Selection Committee
- November 30, 2015 – Clay Helton was named USC's permanent head coach.
