= Cameron Scarlett =

American football player (born 1997)

No. 22
- Position: Running back

Personal information
- Born: October 9, 1996 (age 30); Portland, Oregon, U.S.
- Listed height: 6 ft 1 in (1.85 m)
- Listed weight: 216 lb (98 kg)

Career information
- High school: Central Catholic (Portland, Oregon)
- College: Stanford (2015–2019)
- NFL draft: 2020: undrafted

Career history
- Tennessee Titans (2020)*; Seattle Seahawks (2021)*; Toronto Argonauts (2021); Michigan Panthers (2022)
- * Offseason or practice squad member only

Cameron John Paul Scarlett (born October 9, 1996) is an American former professional football running back. He played college football at Stanford, and went undrafted in the 2020 NFL draft. He ended up being picked up by the Tennessee Titans and Seattle Seahawks but saw no playing time. He is also the brother of Brennan Scarlett.

== College career ==
In his first year at Stanford, he saw no playing time. In his second year, he played 11 games and had 117 rushing yards and a rushing touchdown. He also had 4 kick returns for 39 yards. In his junior year, he earned All-Pac-12 honorable mention despite competing with Bryce Love. He played 14 games and had 389 rushing yards, 174 receiving yards, and 8 rushing touchdowns. He also returned 39 kickoffs for 1,008 yards. In his Senior year he started 2 of 13 games (since Bryce Love got injured), he had 330 rushing yards, 8 rushing touchdowns, 109 receiving yards, and 1 receiving touchdown. In his final year he started all 12 games, he had 840 rushing yards and 7 rushing touchdowns. He received the Irving S. Zeimer Award for Team MVP.

== Professional career ==
Pre-draft measurables
| Height | Weight | Arm length | Hand span |
|---|---|---|---|
| 6 ft 0 1/2 in (1.84 m) | 219 lb (99 kg) | 32 in (0.81 m) | 9 in (0.23 m) |
All values from Pro Day

=== Tennessee Titans ===
On May 7, 2020, Scarlett was signed by the Tennessee Titans as an Undrafted free agent. On August 26, Scarlett was waived by the Tennessee Titans after the signing of Jeremy McNichols.

On September 1, Scarlett worked out with the Indianapolis Colts alongside C.J. Prosise and a few other players; none of which made the roster.

=== Seattle Seahawks ===
On July 23, 2021, Scarlett tried out for the Seattle Seahawks and signed with them the same day. He was cut on August 16 by the Seattle Seahawks.

=== Toronto Argonauts ===
He was signed by the Toronto Argonauts on October 20. He was suspended for 6 days on the same day. He was cut on the same day his suspension was up. On November 15, he was re-signed. He ended up playing a game the next day and had 10 carries for 57 yards. He was cut again on November 25. On December 5, he was re-signed and signed a futures contract on the 8th. On February 11, 2022, he was cut for the final time.

=== Michigan Panthers ===
On March 10, 2022, Scarlett was drafted by the Michigan Panthers of the United States Football League (USFL) in the 2022 USFL supplemental draft. In his first season, he had 215 rushing yards, two rushing touchdowns, 81 receiving yards, one receiving touchdown and 237 kick return yards.
