= Aziz Shittu =

American football player and coach (born 1994)

Colorado Buffaloes
- Title: Graduate assistant

Personal information
- Born: July 27, 1994 (age 32); Merced, California, U.S.
- Listed height: 6 ft 2 in (1.88 m)
- Listed weight: 288 lb (131 kg)

Career information
- Position: Defensive tackle
- High school: Buhach Colony (Atwater, California)
- College: Stanford
- NFL draft: 2016: undrafted

Career history

Playing
- Philadelphia Eagles (2016–2017); Dallas Cowboys (2018–2019)*; Philadelphia Eagles (2019)
- * Offseason or practice squad member only

Coaching
- Colorado (2020–present) Graduate assistant

Awards and highlights
- Super Bowl champion (LII); First-team All-Pac-12 (2015)
- Stats at Pro Football Reference

Aziz Shittu Jr. (born July 27, 1994) is an American former professional football player who was a defensive tackle in the National Football League (NFL). He played college football for the Stanford Cardinal. He was a member of the Philadelphia Eagles in 2017 when the team won Super Bowl LII. He has also played for the Dallas Cowboys. In 2020, Shittu joined the University of Colorado as a defensive graduate assistant coach.

== College career ==
=== Recruiting ===
College recruiting (2012)
Name	Hometown	School	Height	Weight	40^{‡}	Commit date
Aziz Shittu; DT / DE	Atwater, California	Buhach Colony HS	6 ft 2 in (1.88 m)	275 lb (125 kg)	5.63	Jan 2, 2012
Aziz Shittu; DT / DE	Recruit ratings: Scout: Rivals: 247Sports: ESPN: (80)					
Overall recruit ranking: Scout: 91 Rivals: 88 247Sports: 67 ESPN: 80
‡ Refers to 40-yard dash; Note: In many cases, Scout, Rivals, 247Sports, On3, and ESPN may conflict in their listings of height, weight and 40 time.; In these cases, the average was taken. ESPN grades are on a 100-point scale.; Sources: "Stanford 2012 football commitments". Rivals.; "2012 Stanford Commits". Scout.; "Scout.com Team Recruiting Rankings". Scout.; "2012 Team Ranking". Rivals.com.; "2012 Stanford Football Recruiting". 247Sports.

=== College career summary ===
In four years at Stanford University, Shittu had 78 total tackles, including a 10-tackle, two-sack game against Iowa in the Rose Bowl his senior year. In his senior year, Shittu received multiple accolades for his play, including All-Pac-12 first-team, Pac-12 All-Academic first-team, Associated Press All-Pac-12 first-team, and Phil Steele All-Pac-12 second-team. He was named the Most Outstanding Defensive Player for his play in Stanford's win in the 2016 Rose Bowl.

In his junior year, Shittu was selected to the All-Academic Pac-12 first-team, and in his senior year, he was selected to the All-Academic Pac-12 second-team. During his first two years, he received honorable mention for his academics.

=== College statistics ===
Year	Team	Tackles				Fumbles		Interceptions	
Year	Team	Total	Solo	Asst	Sack	FF	FR	Int	PD
2012	Stanford	1	1	0	0	0	0	0	0
2013	Stanford	5	2	3	0	0	0	0	0
2014	Stanford	14	2	12	1.5	0	1	0	1
2015	Stanford	58	28	30	4.0	1	1	0	2
Career		78	33	45	5.5	1	2	0	3

== Professional career ==
=== Philadelphia Eagles ===
Shittu signed with the Philadelphia Eagles as an undrafted free agent on May 5, 2016. He was waived on September 3, 2016, and was signed to the Eagles' practice squad the next day. After spending his entire rookie season on the practice squad, he signed a reserve/future contract with the Eagles on January 2, 2017.

On May 2, 2017, Shittu was waived/injured by the Eagles with a knee injury and was placed on injured reserve. Shittu won Super Bowl LII when the Eagles defeated the New England Patriots 41-33.

On September 1, 2018, Shittu was waived by the Eagles.

=== Dallas Cowboys ===
On September 5, 2018, Shittu was signed to the Dallas Cowboys' practice squad. He was released on September 18, 2018. He was re-signed on November 14, 2018. He signed a reserve/future contract with the Cowboys on January 15, 2019.

On April 10, 2019, the Cowboys waived Shittu.

=== Philadelphia Eagles (second stint) ===
On August 13, 2019, Shittu was signed by the Philadelphia Eagles. He was placed on injured reserve on August 31, 2019. He was waived from injured reserve on October 5, 2019.
