= 2015 Iowa Hawkeyes football team =

American college football season

2015 Iowa Hawkeyes football

Big Ten West Division champion

Big Ten Championship Game, L 13–16 vs Michigan State

Rose Bowl, L 16–45 vs. Stanford
- Conference: Big Ten Conference
- West Division

Ranking
- Coaches: No. 10
- AP: No. 9
- Record: 12–2 (8–0 Big Ten)
- Head coach: Kirk Ferentz (17th season)
- Offensive coordinator: Greg Davis (4th season)
- Offensive scheme: Multiple
- Defensive coordinator: Phil Parker (4th season)
- Base defense: 4–3
- Captains: C. J. Beathard; Austin Blythe; Jordan Lomax; Drew Ott
- Home stadium: Kinnick Stadium

2015 Big Ten Conference football standings
	Conf.			Overall
Team	W		L	W		L
East Division
No. 6 Michigan State xy$^	7	–	1	12	–	2
No. 4 Ohio State x	7	–	1	12	–	1
No. 12 Michigan	6	–	2	10	–	3
Penn State	4	–	4	7	–	6
Indiana	2	–	6	6	–	7
Rutgers	1	–	7	4	–	8
Maryland	1	–	7	3	–	9
West Division
No. 9 Iowa xy	8	–	0	12	–	2
No. 23 Northwestern	6	–	2	10	–	3
No. 21 Wisconsin	6	–	2	10	–	3
Nebraska	3	–	5	6	–	7
Minnesota	2	–	6	6	–	7
Illinois	2	–	6	5	–	7
Purdue	1	–	7	2	–	10
Championship: Michigan State 16, Iowa 13
^ – College Football Playoff participant; $ – Conference champion; x – Division champion/co-champions; y – Championship game participant; Rankings from AP Poll

The 2015 Iowa Hawkeyes football team represented the University of Iowa in the 2015 NCAA Division I FBS football season. The Hawkeyes, led by 17th year head coach Kirk Ferentz, were members of the West Division of the Big Ten Conference and played their home games at Kinnick Stadium. Despite modest expectations entering the season, the team finished 12–2 overall and 8–0 in Big Ten play to win the West Division. After losing a classic to Michigan State in the Big Ten Championship Game, the Hawkeyes were invited to the 2016 Rose Bowl where they were beaten by Stanford. The team established a new single-season school record for wins.

== 2015 commitments ==
College recruiting
Name	Hometown	School	Height	Weight	40^{‡}	Commit date
Ryan Boyle; QB	West Des Moines, IA	Dowling Catholic High School	6 ft 2 in (1.88 m)	204 lb (93 kg)	4.6	Mar 26, 2014
Ryan Boyle; QB	Recruit ratings: Scout: Rivals: 247Sports: ESPN:					
Drew Cook; ATH	Iowa City, IA	Iowa City Regina High School	6 ft 4 in (1.93 m)	208 lb (94 kg)	4.7	Feb 26, 2014
Drew Cook; ATH	Recruit ratings: Scout: Rivals: 247Sports: ESPN:					
James Daniels; C	Warren, OH	Warren G. Harding High School	6 ft 4 in (1.93 m)	287 lb (130 kg)	5.2	Jul 31, 2014
James Daniels; C	Recruit ratings: Scout: Rivals: 247Sports: ESPN:					
Adrian Falconer; WR	Leesburg, FL	Leesburg High School	6 ft 1 in (1.85 m)	186 lb (84 kg)	4.5	Jun 21, 2014
Adrian Falconer; WR	Recruit ratings: Scout: Rivals: 247Sports: ESPN:					
Angelo Garbutt; OLB	Carrollton, TX	Hebron High School	6 ft 2 in (1.88 m)	207 lb (94 kg)	4.5	Mar 2, 2015
Angelo Garbutt; OLB	Recruit ratings: Scout: Rivals: 247Sports: ESPN:					
Eric Graham; RB	Prattville, AL	Autauga Academy	5 ft 10 in (1.78 m)	197 lb (89 kg)	4.4	Apr 2, 2015
Eric Graham; RB	Recruit ratings: Scout: Rivals: 247Sports: ESPN:					
Jack Hockaday; OLB	Maroa, IL	Maroa-Forsyth High School	6 ft 0 in (1.83 m)	203 lb (92 kg)	4.6	Mar 29, 2014
Jack Hockaday; OLB	Recruit ratings: Scout: Rivals: 247Sports: ESPN:					
Garret Jansen; DE	Pella, IA	Pella High School	6 ft 1 in (1.85 m)	248 lb (112 kg)	5.0	Jan 30, 2015
Garret Jansen; DE	Recruit ratings: Scout: Rivals: 247Sports: ESPN:					
Justin Jinning; OLB	The Colony, TX	The Colony High School	6 ft 2 in (1.88 m)	205 lb (93 kg)	4.7	Jun 23, 2015
Justin Jinning; OLB	Recruit ratings: Scout: Rivals: 247Sports: ESPN:					
Ron Nash; WR	Sioux City, IA	Iowa Western Community College	6 ft 1 in (1.85 m)	195 lb (88 kg)	NA	Mar 31, 2015
Ron Nash; WR	Recruit ratings: Scout: Rivals: 247Sports: ESPN:					
Anthony Nelson; DE	Waukee, IA	Waukee High School	6 ft 6 in (1.98 m)	213 lb (97 kg)	4.9	May 1, 2015
Anthony Nelson; DE	Recruit ratings: Scout: Rivals: 247Sports: ESPN:					
Jake Newborg; OG	Inwood, IA	West Lyon High School	6 ft 3 in (1.91 m)	271 lb (123 kg)	5.0	Aug 31, 2014
Jake Newborg; OG	Recruit ratings: Scout: Rivals: 247Sports: ESPN:					
Emmanuel Ogwo; WR	Mesquite, TX	Van Horn High School	6 ft 1 in (1.85 m)	175 lb (79 kg)	4.6	Jul 30, 2014
Emmanuel Ogwo; WR	Recruit ratings: Scout: Rivals: 247Sports: ESPN:					
Levi Paulsen; OT	Moville, IA	Woodbury Central High School	6 ft 5 in (1.96 m)	266 lb (121 kg)	5.0	Feb 3, 2015
Levi Paulsen; OT	Recruit ratings: Scout: Rivals: 247Sports: ESPN:					
Landan Paulsen; OG	Moville, IA	Woodbury Central High School	6 ft 5 in (1.96 m)	274 lb (124 kg)	5.0	Feb 3, 2015
Landan Paulsen; OG	Recruit ratings: Scout: Rivals: 247Sports: ESPN:					
Brady Reiff; DE	Parkston, SD	Parkston High School	6 ft 3 in (1.91 m)	215 lb (98 kg)	4.5	Apr 24, 2014
Brady Reiff; DE	Recruit ratings: Scout: Rivals: 247Sports: ESPN:					
Michael Slater Jr. DE	Chesterfield, MO	Parkway Central High School	6 ft 3 in (1.91 m)	250 lb (110 kg)	4.7	Oct 15, 2015
Michael Slater Jr. DE	Recruit ratings: Scout: Rivals: 247Sports: ESPN:					
Jerminic Smith; WR	Garland, TX	South Garland High School	6 ft 1 in (1.85 m)	176 lb (80 kg)	4.4	Feb 11, 2014
Jerminic Smith; WR	Recruit ratings: Scout: Rivals: 247Sports: ESPN:					
Nate Vejvoda; TE	New Lenox, IL	Providence Catholic High School	6 ft 5 in (1.96 m)	213 lb (97 kg)	4.7	Jul 26, 2014
Nate Vejvoda; TE	Recruit ratings: Scout: Rivals: 247Sports: ESPN:					
Brett Waechter; OT	Hartley, IA	Hartley–Melvin–Sanborn High School	6 ft 5 in (1.96 m)	260 lb (120 kg)	5.0	Nov 6, 2014
Brett Waechter; OT	Recruit ratings: Scout: Rivals: 247Sports: ESPN:					
Nick Wilson; OLB	West Des Moines, IA	Dowling Catholic High School	6 ft 2 in (1.88 m)	206 lb (93 kg)	4.6	Jan 2, 2015
Nick Wilson; OLB	Recruit ratings: Scout: Rivals: 247Sports: ESPN:					
Overall recruit ranking: Scout: 51 Rivals: 58 247Sports: 59
Note: In many cases, Scout, Rivals, 247Sports, On3, and ESPN may conflict in their listings of height and weight.; In these cases, the average was taken. ESPN grades are on a 100-point scale.; Sources: "ESPN- College Football Recruiting Schools". ESPN.; "2015 Team Ranking". Rivals.com.

== Schedule ==
Date	Time	Opponent	Rank	Site	TV	Result	Attendance
September 5	11:00 am	No. 2 (FCS) Illinois State*		Kinnick Stadium; Iowa City, IA	BTN	W 31–14	59,450
September 12	3:45 pm	at Iowa State*		Jack Trice Stadium; Ames, IA (Cy-Hawk Trophy)	FOX	W 31–17	61,500
September 19	7:00 pm	Pittsburgh*		Kinnick Stadium; Iowa City, IA	BTN	W 27–24	63,636
September 26	2:30 pm	North Texas*		Kinnick Stadium; Iowa City, IA	ESPNU	W 62–16	56,041
October 3	11:00 am	at No. 19 Wisconsin		Camp Randall Stadium; Madison, WI (Heartland Trophy)	ESPN	W 10–6	80,933
October 10	11:00 am	Illinois^{†}	No. 22	Kinnick Stadium; Iowa City, IA	ESPN2	W 29–20	66,693
October 17	11:00 am	at No. 20 Northwestern	No. 17	Ryan Field; Evanston, IL	ABC/ESPN2	W 40–10	44,135
October 31	2:30 pm	Maryland	No. 10	Kinnick Stadium; Iowa City, IA	ABC/ESPN2	W 31–15	62,667
November 7	2:30 pm	at Indiana	No. 9	Memorial Stadium; Bloomington, IN	ESPN	W 35–27	44,739
November 14	7:00 pm	Minnesota	No. 5	Kinnick Stadium; Iowa City, IA (Floyd of Rosedale)	BTN	W 40–35	70,585
November 21	11:00 am	Purdue	No. 5	Kinnick Stadium; Iowa City, IA	ESPN2	W 40–20	62,920
November 27	2:30 pm	at Nebraska	No. 4	Memorial Stadium; Lincoln, NE (Heroes Game)	ABC	W 28–20	90,830
December 5	7:15 pm	vs. No. 5 Michigan State	No. 4	Lucas Oil Stadium; Indianapolis, IN (Big Ten Championship Game) (College GameDay)	FOX	L 13–16	66,985
January 1	4:10 pm	vs. No. 6 Stanford*	No. 5	Rose Bowl; Pasadena, CA (Rose Bowl) (College GameDay)	ESPN	L 16–45	94,268
*Non-conference game; ^{†}Homecoming; Rankings from AP Poll and CFP Rankings after November 3 released prior to game; All times are in Central time

== Roster ==
2015 Iowa Hawkeyes football team roster
Players
Coaches
Offense

Pos.	#	Name	Class
QB	16	C. J. Beathard	Jr
QB	11	Ryan Boyle	Fr
QB	18	Drew Cook	Fr
QB	15	Ryan Schmidt	Fr
QB	8	Tyler Wiegers	Fr
RB	40	Lane Akre	Fr
RB	33	Jordan Canzeri	Sr
RB	38	Adam Cox	Jr
RB	29	LeShun Daniels Jr.	Jr
RB	23	Eric Graham	Fr
RB	26	Joly Marcel	Fr
RB	41	Austin Kelly	Fr
RB	45	Drake Kulick	So
RB	31	Aaron Mends	Fr
RB	10	Jonathan Parker	So
RB	42	Macon Plewa	Sr
RB	25	Akrum Wadley	So
WR	2	Brandon Bishop	Fr
WR	82	Adrian Falconer	Fr
WR	84	Andre Harris	So
WR	17	Jacob Hillyer	Sr
WR	15	Joshua Jackson	Fr
WR	14	Conner Keane	So
WR	83	Riley McCarron	Jr
WR	85	Derrick Mitchell, Jr.	So
WR	21	Ronald Nash	Fr
WR	6	Emmanuel Ogwo	Fr
WR	3	Jay Scheel	Fr
WR	9	Jerminic Smith	Fr
WR	4	Tevaun Smith	Jr
WR	20	Andrew Stone	Sr
WR	89	Matt VandeBerg	Jr
TE	87	Jake Duzey (injured)	Sr
TE	46	George Kittle	Jr
TE	80	Henry Krieger-Coble	Sr
TE	92	Jameer Outsey	Fr
TE	86	Peter Pekar	So
TE	92	Blake Simons	Fr
TE	85	Nate Vejvoda	Fr
TE	90	Nate Wieting	Fr
TE	81	Jon Wisnieski	Fr
OL	63	Austin Blythe	Sr
OL	75	Ike Boettger	So
OL	64	Cole Croston	Jr
OL	78	James Daniels	Fr
OL	54	Steve Ferentz	Jr
OL	76	Dalton Ferguson	Fr
OL	74	Mitch Keppy	Jr
OL	70	Lucas LeGrand	Fr
OL	52	Boone Myers	So
OL	57	Jake Newborg	Fr
OL	68	Landan Paulsen	Fr
OL	66	Levi Paulsen	Fr
OL	69	Keegan Render	Fr
OL	59	Ross Reynolds	Fr
OL	58	Eric Simmons	Sr
OL	71	Brett Waechter	Fr
OL	65	Jordan Walsh	Sr
OL	73	Ryan Ward	Jr
OL	79	Sean Welsh	So

Defense

Pos.	#	Name	Class
DL	99	Nathan Bazata	So
DL	90	Sam Brincks	Fr
DL	97	Darian Cooper (injured)	Sr
DL	56	Faith Ekakitie	Jr
DL	77	Daniel Gaffney	So
DL	60	Jacob Giese	Fr
DL	72	Brant Gressel	So
DL	93	Terrence Harris	Fr
DL	40	Parker Hesse	Fr
DL	88	Jake Hulett	So
DL	53	Garret Jansen	Fr
DL	67	Jaleel Johnson	Jr
DL	34	Nate Meier	Sr
DL	98	Anthony Nelson	Fr
DL	96	Matt Nelson	Fr
DL	95	Drew Ott (injured)	Sr
DL	91	Brady Reiff	Fr
DL	94	Michael Slater	Fr
DL	61	Kyle Terlouw	Jr
LB	41	Bo Bower	So
LB	51	Drake Dunker	Fr
LB	36	Cole Fisher	Sr
LB	22	Angelo Garbutt	Fr
LB	45	Eric Grimm	Fr
LB	48	Jack Hockaday	Fr
LB	43	Josey Jewell	So
LB	21	Justin Jinning	Fr
LB	15	Steve Manders	So
LB	44	Ben Niemann	So
LB	39	Travis Perry	Sr
LB	55	Brady Ross	Fr
LB	50	Jacob Sobotka	Fr
LB	49	Melvin Spears	Sr
LB	29	Nick Wilson	Fr
DB	4	Jacob Black	So
DB	7	Sean Draper	Sr
DB	28	Maurice Fleming	Jr
DB	12	Anthony Gair	Jr
DB	30	Jake Gervase	Fr
DB	14	Desmond King	Jr
DB	8	Isaiah Kramme	Fr
DB	27	Jordan Lomax	Sr
DB	13	Greg Mabin	Jr
DB	4	John Milani	Fr
DB	11	Michael Ojemudia	Fr
DB	37	Brandon Snyder	Fr
DB	19	Miles Taylor	So
DB	5	Omar Truitt	Fr
DB	26	Kevin Ward	So

Special teams

Pos.	#	Name	Class
K	2	Mick Ellis	So
K	1	Marshall Koehn	Sr
K	91	Miguel Recinos	Fr
P	16	Dillon Kidd	Sr
P	7	Colton Rastetter	Fr
LS	97	Tyler Kluver	So
LS	50	Jackson Subbert	Fr

Head coach

- Kirk Ferentz

Coordinators/assistant coaches

- Greg Davis – Offensive Coordinator and Quarterbacks
- Phil Parker – Defensive Coordinator
- Brian Ferentz – Offensive Line
- Bobby Kennedy – Wide Receivers
- Reese Morgan – Defensive Line
- Jim Reid – Linebackers
- Seth Wallace – Recruiting Coordinator/Defensive Assistant Coach
- Chris White – Running Backs and Special Teams
- LeVar Woods – Tight Ends
- Chris Doyle – Strength and Conditioning
- Raimond Braithwaite – Strength and Conditioning Assistant Coach
- Justin Lima – Strength and Conditioning Assistant Coach
- Cody Myers – Strength and Conditioning Assistant Coach
- Joel Welsh, Jr. – Strength and Conditioning Assistant Coach
- Paul Federici – Director of Football Operations
- Chic Ejiasi – Director of Player Development
- Scott Southmayd – Director of Player Personnel
- Max Allen – Director of New Media
- Ben Hansen – Assistant Director of Football Operations
- Kelvin Bell – Director of On-Campus Recruiting
- Tyler Anderson – Defensive Graduate Assistant
- Broderick Binns – Special Teams Graduate Assistant
- A.J. Haase – Offensive Graduate Assistant
- Ned Amendola, M.D. – Director, UI Sports Medicine Center
- Doug West – Senior Athletic Trainer
- Russ Haynes – Associate Director, Athletic Training Services
- Bob Rahfeldt – Video Coordinator
- Chris Ruth – Assistant Video Coordinator

Legend

- (C) Team captain
- (S) Suspended
- (I) Ineligible
- Injured
- Redshirt

Roster
Last update: 8/27/15

== Rankings ==
Ranking movements Legend: ██ Increase in ranking ██ Decrease in ranking — = Not ranked RV = Received votes ( ) = First-place votes
	Week															
Poll	Pre	1	2	3	4	5	6	7	8	9	10	11	12	13	14	Final
AP	—	—	RV	RV	RV	22	17	12	10	10	8	6	3	4	6	9
Coaches	—	—	RV	RV	RV	23	17	13	11	11	8	6	3 (1)	3 (1)	7	10
CFP	Not released									9	5	5	4	4	5	Not released

== Game summaries ==
=== #2 (FCS) Illinois State ===
Illinois State at Iowa

Team	1	2	3	4	Total
No. 2 (FCS) Redbirds	0	0	0	14	14
• Hawkeyes	7	10	7	7	31

- Date: September 5
- Location: Kinnick Stadium
  Iowa City, IA
- Game start: 11:01 a.m. CDT
- Elapsed time: 2:55
- Game attendance: 59,450
- Game weather: 84 °F (29 °C), Partly Sunny and Humid, Wind 8–9 mph (13–14 km/h)
- Referee: Todd Geerlings
- TV announcers (BTN): Kevin Kugler (play-by-play), Matt Millen (analyst), Lisa Byington (sideline)
- Sources: Box score

Scoring summary
1	7:29	Iowa	C. J. Beathard 6-yard run (Marshall Koehn kick)	Iowa 7–0
2	12:35	Iowa	Jordan Canzeri 5-yard run (Marshall Koehn kick)	Iowa 14–0
2	0:00	Iowa	Marshall Koehn 40-yard field goal	Iowa 17–0
3	1:22	Iowa	Matt VandeBerg 9-yard pass from C. J. Beathard (Marshall Koehn kick)	Iowa 24–0
4	7:54	Iowa	C. J. Beathard 1-yard run (Marshall Koehn kick)	Iowa 31–0
4	5:34	Illinois St	Brady Tibbits 1-yard pass from Jake Kolbe (Sean Slattery kick)	Iowa 31–7
4	0:49	Illinois St	Anthony Warrum 22-yard pass from Jake Kolbe (Sean Slattery kick)	Iowa 31–14

Iowa was in control of this opening day game but wasn't able to pull away until well into the third quarter. The Hawkeyes had a balanced offensive attack with nearly 450 yards of total offense with Daniels getting over 100 yards on the ground.

Statistics	ILL ST	IOWA
First downs	14	22
Total yards	231	431
Rushing yards	35	210
Passing yards	196	221
Turnovers	0	1
Time of possession	27:32	32:28

Team	Category	Player	Statistics
Illinois State	Passing	Jake Kolbe	11/15, 147 yards, 2 TD
Illinois State	Rushing	M. Coprich	13 carries, 32 yards
Illinois State	Receiving	Anthony Warrum	3 receptions, 58 yards, TD
Iowa	Passing	C. J. Beathard	15/24, 211 yards, TD
Iowa	Rushing	LeShun Daniels	26 carries, 123 yards
Iowa	Receiving	Matt VandeBerg	6 receptions, 59 yards, TD

=== at Iowa State ===
Iowa at Iowa State
Cy-Hawk Trophy

Team	1	2	3	4	Total
• Hawkeyes	3	7	7	14	31
Cyclones	3	14	0	0	17

- Date: September 12
- Location: Jack Trice Stadium
  Ames, IA
- Game start: 3:45 p.m. CDT
- Elapsed time: 3:15
- Game attendance: 61,500
- Game weather: 67 °F (19 °C), Mostly Sunny, Wind N 5 mph (8.0 km/h)
- Referee: Mike Cannon
- TV announcers (FOX): Gus Johnson, Joel Klatt, Molly McGrath
- Source: Box Score

Scoring summary
1	5:44	Iowa	Marshall Koehn 49-yard field goal	Iowa 3–0
1	2:07	Iowa State	Cole Netten 37-yard field goal	Tied 3–3
2	13:12	Iowa State	Quenton Bundrage 11-yard pass from Sam B. Richardson (Cole Netten kick)	Iowa State 10–3
2	4:24	Iowa	Tevaun Smith 14-yard pass from C. J. Beathard (Marshall Koehn kick)	Tied 10–10
2	2:19	Iowa State	Jauan Wesley 29-yard pass from Sam B. Richardson (Cole Netten kick)	Iowa State 17–10
3	10:05	Iowa	Matt VandeBerg 3-yard pass from C. J. Beathard (Marshall Koehn kick)	Tied 17–17
4	2:14	Iowa	Riley McCarron 25-yard pass from C. J. Beathard (Marshall Koehn kick)	Iowa 24–17
4	1:05	Iowa	Jordan Canzeri 8-yard run (Marshall Koehn kick)	Iowa 31–17

It was an emotional week leading up to the game because former All-Big Ten Safety Tyler Sash and basketball legend Roy Marble died. The Hawkeyes honored Sash by wearing the number 9 (Sash's jersey number at Iowa) in place of the Tigerhawk on one side of their helmets.

C. J. Beathard threw three touchdown passes to lead the Hawkeyes to victory. He also added two long runs and was named co-Big Ten Offensive Player of the Week.

Statistics	IOWA	ISU
First downs	22	18
Total yards	475	310
Rushing yards	260	63
Passing yards	215	247
Turnovers	1	1
Time of possession	33:22	26:38

Team	Category	Player	Statistics
Iowa	Passing	C. J. Beathard	15/25, 215 yards, 3 TD
Iowa	Rushing	Jordan Cazeri	24 carries, 124 yards, TD
Iowa	Receiving	Matt VandeBerg	9 receptions, 114 yards, TD
Iowa State	Passing	Sam B. Richardson	19/35, 247 yards, 2 TD, INT
Iowa State	Rushing	Trever Ryen	4 carries, 23 yards
Iowa State	Receiving	Allen Lazard	7 receptions, 71 yards

=== Pittsburgh ===
Pittsburgh at Iowa

Team	1	2	3	4	Total
Panthers	0	7	10	7	24
• Hawkeyes	3	14	0	10	27

- Date: September 19
- Location: Kinnick Stadium
  Iowa City, IA
- Game start: 7:12 p.m. CDT
- Elapsed time: 3:05
- Game attendance: 63,636
- Game weather: 63 °F (17 °C), Mostly Sunny, Wind 2–5 mph (3.2–8.0 km/h)
- Referee: J. Magallanes
- TV announcers (BTN): Joe Beninati, Glen Mason
- Source: Box Score

Scoring summary
1	8:59	Iowa	Marshall Koehn 43-yard field goal	Iowa 3–0
2	14:12	Iowa	C. J. Beathard 9-yard run (Marshall Koehn kick)	Iowa 10–0
2	10:11	Pitt	Scott Orndoff 15-yard pass from Nathan Peterman (Chris Blewitt kick)	Iowa 10–7
2	0:44	Iowa	Jordan Canzeri 4-yard run (Marshall Koehn kick)	Iowa 17–7
3	9:40	Pitt	Chris Blewitt 48-yard field goal	Iowa 17–10
3	5:51	Pitt	Pat Amara, Jr. 28-yard return of blocked punt (Chris Blewitt kick)	Tied 17–17
4	6:04	Iowa	Jordan Canzeri 1-yard run (Marshall Koehn kick)	Iowa 24–17
4	0:52	Pitt	Tyler Boyd 8-yard pass from Nathan Peterman (Chris Blewitt kick)	Tied 24–24
4	0:00	Iowa	Marshall Koehn 57-yard field goal	Iowa 27–24

The Hawkeyes never trailed in this physical matchup, and Marshall Koehn booted a 57-yard field goal as time expired to give Iowa the win. His effort was good enough to earn Big Ten Special Teams Player of the Week honors.

Statistics	PITT	IOWA
First downs	15	22
Total yards	282	363
Rushing yards	55	105
Passing yards	227	258
Turnovers	2	1
Time of possession	27:18	32:42

Team	Category	Player	Statistics
Pittsburgh	Passing	Nathan Peterman	20–29, 219 yards, 2 TD, 2 INT
Pittsburgh	Rushing	D. Hall	14 carries, 38 yards
Pittsburgh	Receiving	Tyler Boyd	10 receptions, 131 yards, TD
Iowa	Passing	C. J. Beathard	27–40, 258 yards, INT
Iowa	Rushing	Jordan Canzeri	12 carries, 49 yards, 2 TD
Iowa	Receiving	Tevaun Smith	3 receptions, 73 yards

=== North Texas ===
North Texas at Iowa

Team	1	2	3	4	Total
Mean Green	0	13	3	0	16
• Hawkeyes	14	21	13	14	62

- Date: September 26
- Location: Kinnick Stadium
  Iowa City, IA
- Game start: 2:32 p.m. CDT
- Elapsed time: 3:18
- Game attendance: 56,041
- Game weather: 77 °F (25 °C), Mostly Sunny, Wind W 10 mph (16 km/h)
- Referee: Jerry McGinn
- TV announcers (ESPNU): Anish Shroff, Ahmad Brooks
- Source: Box Score

Scoring summary
1	11:36	Iowa	Jordan Canzeri 16-yard run (Marshall Koehn kick)	Iowa 7–0
1	5:56	Iowa	Jordan Canzeri 10-yard run (Marshall Koehn kick)	Iowa 14–0
2	13:17	North Texas	Trevor Moore 38-yard field goal	Iowa 14–3
2	12:20	Iowa	George Kittle 43-yard pass from C. J. Bethard (Marshall Koehn kick)	Iowa 21–3
2	10:47	Iowa	Tevaun Smith 81-yard pass from C. J. Bethard (Marshall Koehn kick)	Iowa 28–3
2	7:54	North Texas	Trevor Moore 38-yard field goal	Iowa 28–6
2	7:33	North Texas	Chris Loving 6-yard pass from Carlos Harris (Trevor Moore kick)	Iowa 28–13
2	1:56	Iowa	Jordan Canzeri 3-yard run (Marshall Koehn kick)	Iowa 35–13
3	10:48	North Texas	Trevor Moore 31-yard field goal	Iowa 35–16
3	0:45	Iowa	Jordan Canzeri 1-yard run (Marshall Koehn kick)	Iowa 42–16
3	0:15	Iowa	Josey Jewell 34-yard interception return (Marshall Koehn kick failed)	Iowa 48–16
4	6:35	Iowa	Akrum Wadley 2-yard run (Miguel Recinos kick)	Iowa 55–16
4	2:47	Iowa	Bo Bower 88-yard interception return (Miguel Recinos kick)	Iowa 62–16

The Hawkeyes dominated from start to finish in this lopsided victory. The final result isn't even indicative of how much Iowa rolled over the Mean Green as Iowa called off the dogs in the second half but still continued to score. Jordan Canzeri rushed for 4 touchdowns to tie the Iowa single-game record.

Statistics	UNT	IOWA
First downs	22	23
Total yards	356	488
Rushing yards	183	210
Passing yards	173	278
Turnovers	3	2
Time of possession	28:15	31:45

Team	Category	Player	Statistics
North Texas	Passing	Andrew McNulty	14–36, 137 yards, INT
North Texas	Rushing	Jeff Wilson	14 carries, 74 yards
North Texas	Receiving	Carlos Harris	5 receptions, 43 yards
Iowa	Passing	C. J. Beathard	18–21, 278 yards, 2 TD
Iowa	Rushing	Jordan Canzeri	22 carries, 115 yards, 4 TD
Iowa	Receiving	Tevaun Smith	4 receptions, 115 yards, TD

=== at No. 19 Wisconsin ===
Iowa at #19 Wisconsin
Heartland Trophy

Team	1	2	3	4	Total
• Hawkeyes	0	10	0	0	10
No. 19 Badgers	3	0	3	0	6

- Date: October 3
- Location: Camp Randall Stadium
  Madison, WI
- Game start: 11:01 a.m. CDT
- Elapsed time: 3:15
- Game attendance: 80,933
- Game weather: 50 °F (10 °C), Partly Cloudy, Wind ENE 14 mph (23 km/h)
- Referee: D. Willard
- TV announcers (ESPN): Steve Levy, Brock Huard, Shannon Spake
- Source: Box Score

Scoring summary
1	9:58	Wis	Rafael Gaglianone 46-yard field goal	Wisconsin 3–0
2	2:59	Iowa	George Kittle 1-yard pass from C. J. Beathard (Marshall Koehn kick)	Iowa 7–3
2	1:03	Iowa	Marshall Koehn 33-yard field goal	Iowa 10–3
3	3:40	Wis	Rafael Gaglianone 46-yard field goal	Iowa 10–6

Following a season opening loss to #3 Alabama, the Badgers entered this game ranked #19 after three straight convincing wins (outscoring those opponents 114–3). Wisconsin kicked a field goal on the game's opening possession to take an early 3–0 lead. The Hawkeyes capitalized on two second quarter miscues to take a 10–3 advantage into the locker room. Wisconsin tacked on a field goal in the 3rd quarter, making it 10–6. Midway through the 4th quarter, the Hawkeyes recovered a costly Wisconsin fumble on a 2nd and goal play from the Iowa 1-yard line. The Badgers reached the Iowa 16 on their final possession, but a 4th down pass fell incomplete with 36 seconds remaining and the Hawkeyes ran out the clock, ending a classic defensive battle. Cornerback Desmond King collected his second two-interception game of the season and was named co-Big Ten Defensive Player of the Week and Jim Thorpe Defensive Player of the Week.

Wisconsin was 71–9 in 80 games at Camp Randall Stadium dating back to the final game of the 2003 regular season and ending with this game. Incredibly, Iowa was 4–1 in those games with Wisconsin going 70–5 against all other opponents.

After this game, Wisconsin held a 44–43–2 edge in the rivalry.

Statistics	IOWA	WIS
First downs	14	21
Total yards	221	320
Rushing yards	144	86
Passing yards	77	234
Turnovers	2	4
Time of possession	29:14	30:46

Team	Category	Player	Statistics
Iowa	Passing	C. J. Beathard	9/21, 77 yards, TD, INT
Iowa	Rushing	Jordan Canzeri	26 carries, 125 yards
Iowa	Receiving	Matt VandeBerg	6 receptions, 61 yards
Wisconsin	Passing	Joel Stave	21/38, 234 yards, 2 INT
Wisconsin	Rushing	Taiwan Deal	15 carries, 59 yards
Wisconsin	Receiving	Dare Ogunbowale	4 receptions, 43 yards

=== Illinois ===
Illinois at #22 Iowa
Homecoming

Team	1	2	3	4	Total
Fighting Illini	7	0	6	7	20
• No. 22 Hawkeyes	6	10	7	6	29

- Date: October 10
- Location: Kinnick Stadium
  Iowa City, IA
- Game start: 11:01 a.m. CDT
- Elapsed time: 3:29
- Game attendance: 66,693
- Game weather: 57 °F (14 °C), Mostly Sunny, Wind 6 mph (9.7 km/h)
- Referee: Daniel Capron
- TV announcers (ESPN2): Clay Matvick, John Congemi
- Source: Box Score

Scoring summary
1	8:30	Iowa	George Kittle 21-yard pass from C. J. Beathard (Marshall Koehn kick failed)	Iowa 6–0
1	6:29	Illinois	Ke'Shawn Vaughn 4 yard run (T. Zalewski kick)	Illinois 7–6
2	7:50	Iowa	Jordan Canzeri 17-yard pass from C. J. Beathard (Marshall Koehn kick)	Iowa 13–7
2	0:15	Iowa	Marshall Koehn 19-yard field goal	Iowa 16–7
3	11:32	Illinois	T. Zalewski 37-yard field goal	Iowa 16–10
3	2:56	Illinois	T. Zalewski 40-yard field goal	Iowa 16–13
3	2:45	Iowa	Jordan Canzeri 75-yard run (Marshall Koehn kick)	Iowa 23–13
4	10:13	Illinois	Geronimo Allison 53-yard pass from Wes Lunt (T. Zalewski kick)	Iowa 23–20
4	3:20	Iowa	Marshall Koehn 34-yard field goal	Iowa 26–20
4	2:11	Iowa	Marshall Koehn 40-yard field goal	Iowa 29–20

Senior running back Jordan Canzeri carried the ball 43 times (school record) for 256 yards (third-best in school history) and a touchdown. He also had a receiving touchdown, and earned Big Ten Offensive Player of the Week honors.

Statistics	ILL	IOWA
First downs	20	23
Total yards	363	478
Rushing yards	46	278
Passing yards	317	200
Turnovers	2	0
Time of possession	24:09	35:51

Team	Category	Player	Statistics
Illinois	Passing	Wes Lunt	25–42, 317 yards, TD
Illinois	Rushing	Ke'Shawn Vaughn	19 carries, 67 yards, TD
Illinois	Receiving	Geronimo Allison	8 receptions, 148 yards, TD
Iowa	Passing	C. J. Beathard	15–31, 200 yards, 2 TD
Iowa	Rushing	Jordan Canzeri	43 carries, 256 yards, TD
Iowa	Receiving	Jerminic Smith	4 receptions, 118 yards

=== at No. 20 Northwestern ===
#17 Iowa at #20 Northwestern

Team	1	2	3	4	Total
• No. 17 Hawkeyes	3	13	14	10	40
No. 20 Wildcats	0	10	0	0	10

- Date: October 17
- Location: Ryan Field
  Evanston, IL
- Game start: 11:05 a.m. CDT
- Elapsed time: 3:24
- Game attendance: 44,135
- Game weather: 46 °F (8 °C), Partly cloudy, Wind NNW 12 mph (19 km/h)
- Referee: Jeff Servinski
- TV announcers (ABC/ESPN2): Dave Pasch, Brian Griese, Tom Luginbill
- Sources: Box score

Scoring summary
1	9:59	Iowa	Marshall Koehn 36-yard field goal	Iowa 3–0
2	14:52	Iowa	Akrum Wadley 35-yard run (Marshall Koehn kick failed)	Iowa 9–0
2	10:15	Iowa	Akrum Wadley 4-yard run (Marshall Koehn kick)	Iowa 16–0
2	6:18	NW	Christian Jones 4-yard pass from Clayton Thorson (Jack Mitchell kick)	Iowa 16–7
2	2:40	NW	Jack Mitchell 20-yard field goal	Iowa 16–10
3	6:42	Iowa	Akrum Wadley 2-yard run (Marshall Koehn kick)	Iowa 23–10
3	5:26	Iowa	Akrum Wadley 4-yard run (Marshall Koehn kick)	Iowa 30–10
4	10:49	Iowa	Marshall Koehn 22-yard field goal	Iowa 33–10
4	7:55	Iowa	Derrick Mitchell Jr. 13-yard run (Marshall Koehn kick)	Iowa 40–10

Despite entering the game very banged up, and losing RB Jordan Canzeri early in this one, Iowa dominated the Wildcats. Sophomore Akrum Wadley became the second Iowa running back to go over 200 yards in Big Ten play (in 2015). He finished with 204 yards and a school record-tying 4 rushing touchdowns, and was named Big Ten Offensive Player of the Week.

The 30-point Hawkeye victory spoiled Northwestern's Homecoming and the 20-year Reunion of the 1995 Big Ten Championship team.

Statistics	IOWA	NW
First downs	24	13
Total yards	492	198
Rushing yards	294	51
Passing yards	198	147
Turnovers	1	3
Time of possession	37:22	22:38

Team	Category	Player	Statistics
Iowa	Passing	C. J. Beathard	15/25, 176 yards, INT
Iowa	Rushing	Akrum Wadley	26 carries, 204 yards, 4 TD
Iowa	Receiving	Matt VandeBerg	8 receptions, 78 yards
Northwestern	Passing	Clayton Thorson	17/35, 125 yards, TD, INT
Northwestern	Rushing	Justin Jackson	10 carries, 30 yards
Northwestern	Receiving	Justin Jackson	5 receptions, 17 yards

=== Maryland ===
Maryland at #10 Iowa

Team	1	2	3	4	Total
Terrapins	0	0	0	15	15
• No. 10 Hawkeyes	7	14	0	10	31

- Date: October 31
- Location: Kinnick Stadium
  Iowa City, IA
- Game start: 2:41 p.m. CDT
- Elapsed time: 3:08
- Game attendance: 62,667
- Game weather: 51 °F (11 °C), Cloudy with rain, Wind W 10 mph (16 km/h)
- Referee: Ron Snodgrass
- TV announcers (ABC/ESPN2): Adam Amin, Kelly Stouffer, Olivia Harlan
- Sources: Box score

Scoring summary
1	4:42	Iowa	Leshun Daniels 1-yard run (Marshall Koehn kick)	Iowa 7–0
2	8:30	Iowa	Akrum Wadley 11-yard run (Marshall Koehn kick)	Iowa 14–0
2	0:09	Iowa	Derrick Mitchell Jr. 2-yard run (Marshall Koehn kick)	Iowa 21–0
4	14:37	Maryland	Taivon Jacobs 7-yard pass from Perry Hills (Brad Craddock kick)	Iowa 21–7
4	11:04	Iowa	Marshall Koehn 49-yard field goal	Iowa 24–7
4	7:38	Iowa	Desmond King 88-yard interception return (Marshall Koehn kick)	Iowa 31–7
4	7:26	Maryland	William Likely 100-yard kickoff return (Perry Hills rush)	Iowa 31–15

The Hawkeyes never trailed in this game with the Terrapins. However, the game's result was still in doubt well into the fourth quarter until a pick six by eventual Jim Thorpe awardee and future NFL player Desmond King all but assured the victory for Iowa.

Statistics	MD	IOWA
First downs	15	18
Total yards	241	293
Rushing yards	167	110
Passing yards	74	183
Turnovers	4	1
Time of possession	27:08	32:52

Team	Category	Player	Statistics
Maryland	Passing	Perry Hills	11–22, 74 yards, TD, 3 INT
Maryland	Rushing	Perry Hills	19 carries, 104 yards
Maryland	Receiving	T. Jacobs	3 receptions, 18 yards, TD
Iowa	Passing	C. J. Beathard	12–23, 183 yards
Iowa	Rushing	Akrum Wadley	19 carries, 67 yards, TD
Iowa	Receiving	Matt VandeBerg	3 receptions, 54 yards

=== at Indiana ===
#9 Iowa at Indiana

Team	1	2	3	4	Total
• No. 9 Hawkeyes	7	14	0	14	35
Hoosiers	3	14	0	10	27

- Date: November 7
- Location: Memorial Stadium
  Bloomington, IN
- Game start: 3:35 p.m. EST
- Elapsed time: 2:55
- Game attendance: 44,739
- Game weather: 58 °F (14 °C), Sunny, Wind NW 6 mph (9.7 km/h)
- Referee: Jerry McGinn
- TV announcers (ESPN): Mike Patrick, Ed Cunningham, Jerry Punch
- Sources: Box score

Scoring summary
1	14:10	Iowa	Akrum Wadley 65-yard run (Marshall Koehn kick)	Iowa 7–0
1	10:09	Indiana	Griffin Oakes 32-yard field goal	Iowa 7–3
2	12:17	Iowa	LeShun Daniels 4-yard run (Marshall Koehn kick)	Iowa 14–3
2	8:52	Indiana	Jordan Howard 37-yard run (Griffin Oakes kick)	Iowa 14–10
2	3:52	Indiana	Jordan Howard 29-yard run (Griffin Oakes kick)	Indiana 17–14
2	0:17	Iowa	C. J. Beathard 7-yard run (Marshall Koehn kick)	Iowa 21–17
4	13:22	Indiana	Griffin Oakes 28-yard field goal	Iowa 21–20
4	10:07	Iowa	LeShun Daniels 1-yard run (Marshall Koehn kick)	Iowa 28–20
4	6:03	Iowa	George Kittle 10-yard pass from C. J. Beathard (Marshall Koehn kick)	Iowa 35–20
4	2:24	Indiana	Michael Cooper 11-yard pass from Nate Sudfeld (Griffin Oakes kick)	Iowa 35–27

Every time it looked like Iowa might pull away, Indiana came back to keep it close in this back-and-forth game. One of the most critical plays of the contest came on a C. J. Beathard diving touchdown with only 17 seconds remaining before halftime. The play was reviewed as it looked like he might have lost possession before crossing the goal line but it was ultimately ruled a touchdown.

Statistics	IOWA	IU
First downs	26	26
Total yards	467	407
Rushing yards	234	227
Passing yards	233	180
Turnovers	0	1
Time of possession	34:30	25:30

Team	Category	Player	Statistics
Iowa	Passing	C. J. Beathard	19/31, 233 yards, TD
Iowa	Rushing	Akrum Wadley	12 carries, 120 yards, TD
Iowa	Receiving	Matt VandeBerg	5 receptions, 68 yards
Indiana	Passing	Nate Sudfeld	16/37, 180 yards, TD, INT
Indiana	Rushing	Jordan Howard	22 carries, 174 yards, 2 TD
Indiana	Receiving	Rickey Jones	4 receptions, 39 yards

=== Minnesota ===
Minnesota at #5 Iowa
Floyd of Rosedale

Team	1	2	3	4	Total
Golden Gophers	7	7	7	14	35
• No. 5 Hawkeyes	7	17	3	13	40

- Date: November 14
- Location: Kinnick Stadium
  Iowa City, IA
- Game start: 7:12 p.m. CST
- Elapsed time: 3:15
- Game attendance: 70,585
- Game weather: 58 °F (14 °C), Clear, Wind 5 mph (8.0 km/h)
- Referee: John O'Neill
- TV announcers (BTN): Kevin Kugler (play-by-play), Matt Millen (analyst), Lisa Byington (sideline)
- Sources: Box score

Scoring summary
1	4:23	Iowa	LeShun Daniels 3-yard run (Marshall Koehn kick)	Iowa 7–0
1	1:54	Minn	Mitch Leidner 2-yard run (Ryan Santoso kick)	Tied 7–7
2	14:24	Iowa	C. J. Beathard 1-yard run (Marshall Koehn kick)	Iowa 14–7
2	12:06	Minn	Brandon Lingen 40-yard pass from Mitch Leidner (Ryan Santoso kick)	Tied 14–14
2	7:47	Iowa	Marshall Koehn 47-yard field goal	Iowa 17–14
2	0:44	Iowa	LeShun Daniels 2-yard run (Marshall Koehn kick)	Iowa 24–14
3	8:04	Iowa	Marshall Koehn 38-yard field goal	Iowa 27–14
3	1:05	Minn	R. Williams 1-yard run (Ryan Santoso kick)	Iowa 27–21
4	14:30	Iowa	C. J. Beathard 1-yard run (C. J. Beathard run failed)	Iowa 33–21
4	5:32	Minn	Drew Wolitarsky 42-yard pass from Shannon Brooks (Ryan Santoso kick)	Iowa 33–28
4	2:01	Iowa	LeShun Daniels 51-yard run (Marshall Koehn kick)	Iowa 40–28
4	1:16	Minn	Shannon Brooks 3-yard run (Ryan Santoso kick)	Iowa 40–35

Minnesota returned to Kinnick Stadium for the annual Floyd of Rosedale game with a lot of momentum from last year, when they routed Iowa 51–14 in the Twin Cities. Minnesota, despite losing David Cobb to the NFL last year and going through a mid-season coaching transition, had a lot to prove as they entered the undefeated #5 Iowa's home stadium in an attempt to deliver the upset. Mitch Leidner, who had not lived up to expectations early in the season, was coming off a good run of games, and had two weeks earlier come within a 4th-down pass at the 1 to beating a hot Michigan team.

Minnesota hung on well to the Hawkeyes but were unable to stop the Iowa halfbacks. LeShun Daniels Jr. ran for nearly 200 yards, and CJ Beathard scored on a play action bootleg in the red zone, reminiscent of Iowa great Chuck Long's game-winning bootleg against Michigan State in 1985.

Iowa kept building on its lead all night, and LeShun Daniels Jr. broke through the box to run it in 51 yards in the final 3 minutes. With Minnesota down two scores, Shannon Brooks took the offense on a high-energy no-huddle drive through the air that took less than 1 minute to score. Minnesota's onside kick failed, and Iowa took the win, 40–35.

Statistics	MINN	IOWA
First downs	24	27
Total yards	434	506
Rushing yards	133	272
Passing yards	301	234
Turnovers	0	0
Time of possession	24:28	35:32

Team	Category	Player	Statistics
Minnesota	Passing	Mitch Leidner	19–27, 259 yards, TD
Minnesota	Rushing	Shannon Brooks	14 carries, 86 yards, TD
Minnesota	Receiving	K. J. Maye	7 receptions, 106 yards
Iowa	Passing	C. J. Beathard	18–26, 213 yards
Iowa	Rushing	LeShun Daniels	26 carries, 195 yards, 3 TD
Iowa	Receiving	Matt VandeBerg	6 receptions, 74 yards

=== Purdue ===
Purdue at #5 Iowa

Team	1	2	3	4	Total
Boilermakers	0	10	3	7	20
• No. 5 Hawkeyes	14	6	7	13	40

- Date: November 21
- Location: Kinnick Stadium
  Iowa City, IA
- Game start: 11:00 a.m. CST
- Elapsed time: 3:16
- Game attendance: 62,920
- Game weather: 27 °F (−3 °C), Mostly sunny, Wind 25 mph (40 km/h)
- Referee: Jeff Servinski
- TV announcers (ESPN2): Beth Mowins, Anthony Becht, Paul Carcaterra
- Sources: Box score

Scoring summary
1	8:54	Iowa	LeShun Daniels 2-yard run (Marshall Koehn kick)	Iowa 7–0
1	4:32	Iowa	LeShun Daniels 13-yard run (Marshall Koehn kick)	Iowa 14–0
2	13:40	Iowa	Matt VandeBerg 7-yard pass from C. J. Beathard (Marshall Koehn kick blocked)	Iowa 20–0
2	3:55	Purdue	Markell Jones 1-yard run (Paul Griggs kick)	Iowa 20–7
2	0:25	Purdue	Paul Griggs 20-yard field goal	Iowa 20–10
3	10:26	Purdue	Paul Griggs 22-yard field goal	Iowa 20–13
3	3:20	Iowa	George Kittle 35-yard pass from C. J. Beathard (Marshall Koehn kick)	Iowa 27–13
4	8:40	Iowa	Henry Krieger-Coble 22-yard pass from C. J. Beathard (Marshall Koehn kick failed)	Iowa 33–13
4	4:46	Purdue	S. Mikesky 19-yard pass from Austin Appleby (Paul Griggs kick)	Iowa 33–20
4	2:12	Iowa	Jordan Canzeri 42-yard run (Marshall Koehn kick)	Iowa 40–20

The Hawkeyes jumped ahead 20–0 early in the second quarter and, after Purdue closed to within 20–13, scored 20 of the game's final 27 points for the 40–20 triumph. The win on Senior Day secured Iowa's first unbeaten record at Kinnick Stadium since the 2004 season (6–0), and matched the 7–0 mark at home from the 2003 season.

Senior Jordan Lomax led the Hawkeyes with 13 tackles, broke up a pass and forced a fumble in earning Lott IMPACT Player of the Week honors.

Statistics	PUR	IOWA
First downs	21	21
Total yards	405	387
Rushing yards	137	174
Passing yards	268	213
Turnovers	1	1
Time of possession	32:54	27:06

Team	Category	Player	Statistics
Purdue	Passing	Austin Appleby	23–40, 259 yards, TD
Purdue	Rushing	Markell Jones	24 carries, 87 yards, TD
Purdue	Receiving	DeAngelo Yancey	9 receptions, 117 yards
Iowa	Passing	C. J. Beathard	12–20, 213 yards, 3 TD
Iowa	Rushing	Jordan Canzeri	13 carries, 95 yards, TD
Iowa	Receiving	Henry Krieger-Coble	4 receptions, 76 yards, TD

=== at Nebraska ===
#4 Iowa at Nebraska
The Heroes Game

Team	1	2	3	4	Total
• No. 4 Hawkeyes	0	14	14	0	28
Cornhuskers	0	10	7	3	20

- Date: November 27
- Location: Memorial Stadium
  Lincoln, NE
- Game start: 2:36 p.m. CST
- Elapsed time: 3:23
- Game attendance: 90,830
- Game weather: 24 °F (−4 °C), Overcast, Wind N 13 mph (21 km/h)
- Referee: Ron Snodgrass
- TV announcers (ABC): Adam Amin, Kelly Stouffer, Olivia Harlan
- Sources: Box score

Scoring summary
2	13:50	Iowa	George Kittle 10-yard pass from C. J. Beathard (Marshall Koehn kick)	Iowa 7–0
2	10:18	Nebraska	Imani Cross 4-yard run (Drew Brown kick)	Tied 7–7
2	6:38	Iowa	Parker Hesse 4-yard Interception return (Marshall Koehn kick)	Iowa 14–7
2	0:03	Nebraska	Drew Brown 39-yard field goal	Iowa 14–10
3	12:17	Iowa	Jordan Canzeri 29-yard run (Marshall Koehn kick)	Iowa 21–10
3	7:00	Nebraska	Imani Cross 4-yard run (Drew Brown kick)	Iowa 21–17
3	6:43	Iowa	Jordan Canzeri 68-yard run (Marshall Koehn kick)	Iowa 28–17
4	1:17	Nebraska	Drew Brown 42-yard field goal	Iowa 28–20

The Hawkeyes finished their first unbeaten regular season since the 1922 season, establishing a single-season school record with 12 wins. Iowa intercepted four passes (Parker Hesse returned one for a touchdown to earn Big Ten Freshman of the Week honors), and Jordan Canzeri ran for 140 yards and two touchdowns in the victory. With wins over Iowa State, Wisconsin, Minnesota, and Nebraska, Iowa recaptured all four rivalry trophies in 2015.

Statistics	IOWA	NEB
First downs	11	22
Total yards	250	433
Rushing yards	153	137
Passing yards	97	296
Turnovers	1	4
Time of possession	23:54	36:06

Team	Category	Player	Statistics
Iowa	Passing	C. J. Beathard	9/16, 97 yards, TD
Iowa	Rushing	Jordan Canzeri	17 carries, 140 yards, 2 TD
Iowa	Receiving	George Kittle	2 receptions, 35 yards, TD
Nebraska	Passing	Tommy Armstrong Jr.	25/45, 296 yards, 4 INT
Nebraska	Rushing	Imani Cross	19 carries, 55 yards, 2 TD
Nebraska	Receiving	Cethan Carter	4 receptions, 76 yards

=== vs. No. 5 Michigan State (Big Ten Championship Game) ===
#5 Michigan State vs. #4 Iowa
Big Ten Championship Game

Team	1	2	3	4	Total
• No. 5 Spartans	3	0	6	7	16
No. 4 Hawkeyes	3	3	0	7	13

- Date: December 5
- Location: Lucas Oil Stadium
  Indianapolis, IN
- Game start: 8:18 p.m. EST
- Elapsed time: 3:31
- Game attendance: 66,985
- Game weather: Indoors
- Referee: John O'Neill
- TV announcers (FOX): Gus Johnson, Joel Klatt, Molly McGrath
- Sources: Box score

Scoring summary
1	11:11	MSU	Michael Geiger 23-yard field goal	MSU 3–0
1	5:08	Iowa	Marshall Koehn 24-yard field goal	Tied 3–3
2	13:28	Iowa	Marshall Koehn 43-yard field goal	Iowa 6–3
3	4:23	MSU	Michael Geiger 29-yard field goal	Tied 6–6
3	0:57	MSU	Michael Geiger 47-yard field goal	MSU 9–6
4	14:49	Iowa	Tevaun Smith 85-yard pass from C. J. Beathard (Marshall Koehn kick)	Iowa 13–9
4	0:27	MSU	LJ Scott 1-yard run (Michael Geiger kick)	MSU 16–13

ESPN's College GameDay was on hand for this championship game in Indy. Iowa turned the ball over twice in the first half – a fumble leading to the Spartans first points and an interception in the end zone – but led 6–3. Michigan State dominated the third quarter in time of possession and yardage, and tacked on two field goals to lead 9–6. Trailing entering the 4th quarter for the first time all season, the Hawkeyes responded in a big way with an 85-yard touchdown pass from C. J. Beathard to Tevaun Smith that gave Iowa a 13–9 lead with 14:49 remaining. After exchanging punts, Michigan State marched 82 yards in 22 plays and took 9:04 off the clock. The game-winning score came on a 1-yard touchdown run with 27 seconds left.

Statistics	MSU	IOWA
First downs	20	13
Total yards	365	268
Rushing yards	174	52
Passing yards	191	216
Turnovers	1	3
Time of possession	36:38	23:22

Team	Category	Player	Statistics
Michigan State	Passing	Connor Cook	16–32, 191 yards, INT
Michigan State	Rushing	LJ Scott	22 carries, 73 yards, TD
Michigan State	Receiving	Aaron Burbridge	5 receptions, 61 yards
Iowa	Passing	C. J. Beathard	18–26, 216 yards, TD, INT
Iowa	Rushing	Derrick Mitchell Jr.	4 carries, 24 yards
Iowa	Receiving	Tevaun Smith	5 receptions, 110 yards, TD

=== vs. No. 6 Stanford (Rose Bowl) ===
#6 Stanford vs. #5 Iowa
Rose Bowl

Team	1	2	3	4	Total
• No. 6 Cardinal	21	14	3	7	45
No. 5 Hawkeyes	0	0	3	13	16

- Date: January 1
- Location: Rose Bowl
  Pasadena, CA
- Game start: 2:12 p.m. PST
- Elapsed time: 3:23
- Game attendance: 94,268
- Game weather: Sunny, 64 °F (18 °C), wind 5 mph (8.0 km/h) SW
- Referee: Reggie Smith
- TV announcers (ESPN): Brent Musburger, Jesse Palmer and Maria Taylor
- Sources: Box score

Scoring summary
1	14:49	Stan	C. McCaffrey 75-yard pass from K. Hogan (Ukropina kick)	Stan 7–0
1	9:12	Stan	K. Hogan 8-yard run (Ukropina kick)	Stan 14–0
1	4:07	Stan	Meeks 66-yard INT return (Ukropina kick)	Stan 21–0
2	14:12	Stan	C. McCaffrey 66-yard punt return (Ukropina kick)	Stan 28–0
2	8:22	Stan	M. Rector 31-yard pass from K. Hogan (Ukropina kick)	Stan 35–0
3	11:09	Stan	Ukropina 31-yard field goal	Stan 38–0
3	3:36	Iowa	Marshall Koehn 39-yard field goal	Stan 38–3
4	13:12	Iowa	Matt VandeBerg 36-yard pass from C. J. Beathard (Marshall Koehn kick failed)	Stan 38–9
4	2:46	Iowa	Akrum Wadley 31-yard pass from C. J. Beathard (Marshall Koehn kick)	Stan 38–16
4	1:54	Stan	M. Rector 42-yard pass from K. Hogan (Ukropina kick)	Stan 45–16

The Hawkeyes received a bid to the 2016 Rose Bowl after dropping in the College Football Playoff ranking to #5 in their loss to Michigan State, which came as a surprise to much of sports media who believed that Ohio State would jump the loser of the Big Ten Championship Game. Since the Rose Bowl traditionally gives a bid to the winner of the Big Ten and Pac-12 conferences, and due to the new College Football Playoff system where the conference champion was likely to enter the playoff, the Rose Bowl committee had announced prior to the Big Ten Championship Game that they would give a bid to the second highest-ranked Big Ten team if a Big Ten team entered the playoff, since it was clear that the winner of the Big Ten Championship Game would finish in the Top 4 ranking.

#5 Iowa was named the home team and #6 Stanford was named the away team. Sports analysts had anticipated the contest to be exciting, due mainly to the matchup between Iowa's strong run defense and Stanford running back Christian McCaffrey, the Heisman Trophy runner-up. Iowa's run defense finished the season ranked 14th, allowing only 121 yards per game and having defeated historically rushing teams like Wisconsin, Indiana, and Nebraska. Contrarily, Christian McCaffrey led the FBS in the 2015 season with 3,864 all-purpose yards, which came from punt/kick returns, runs from scrimmage, and passes out of the backfield.

Christian McCaffrey caught a short pass and turned it into a 75-yard touchdown on the first play from scrimmage. The Hawkeyes were unable to stop him, as he averaged 9.6 YPC (172 yards on 18 carries), returned a punt for a touchdown, and converted many third downs. Though he did not rush for any touchdowns from scrimmage, he proved to be the primary playmaker for Stanford, catching a third (4) of Kevin Hogan's passes. McCaffrey was such an offensive threat that Hogan was able to make large gains with the read option, including a wide-open first-quarter option TD run.

Iowa was unable to get their run game going, rushing as a team for 1.3 YPC (48 yards on 38 carries). The longest Iowa runs came from LeShun Daniels Jr. and Akrum Wadley (14 and 12 yards, respectively), as well as a 14-yard scramble by Beathard. Iowa's inability to establish a run game closed up Iowa's potential for play-action passing, which has been Beathard's bread and butter all season. Jordan Canzeri, Iowa's power halfback, was unable to churn significant yardage, and 3rd-team halfback Akrum Wadley (who had a 200-yard game at Northwestern, when Daniels and Canzeri were both injured) split ballcarrying duties with Daniels in the second half. Iowa's halfbacks, their biggest threat all season, were overall unable to garner any significant yardage on the ground; Derek Mitchell Jr., Iowa's 4th-team halfback, saw significant action lining up in the backfield and caught 4 passes for 41 yards, and Wadley also contributed to the pass game by catching 3 for 60.

Stanford shut Iowa out in the first half 35–0, with Stanford's 35 points the most scored in the first half of a Rose Bowl in its entire 102-year history. Stanford's 21–0 first-quarter lead was also the most first-quarter points scored by one team in Rose Bowl history. Christian McCaffrey gained a total of 368 all-purpose yards, setting another Rose Bowl record.

By the second half, Stanford's explosiveness slowed down, scoring just 10 second-half points versus their 35 first-half points. Iowa did not score until the 3rd quarter when placekicker Marshall Koehn kicked a field goal after converting on 4th down earlier in the drive; Beathard threw 2 touchdowns in the 4th quarter, with Koehn missing one of the two PATs.

Iowa had a slight advantage in time of possession, possessing the ball for almost 33 minutes, though they were simply unable to make meaning out of their possessions. Iowa also outgained Stanford through the air by a slim margin, with 239 yards to Stanford's 223.

Iowa remained a symbol of old-school Big Ten power football, with most of their completed passes thrown to tight ends and halfbacks. Matt Vandeberg caught a touchdown pass, but star wideout Tevaun Smith only recorded 2 short receptions.

Statistics	STAN	IOWA
First downs	19	18
Total yards	429	287
Rushing yards	206	48
Passing yards	223	239
Turnovers	1	2
Time of possession	27:09	32:51

Team	Category	Player	Statistics
Stanford	Passing	Kevin Hogan	12–21, 223 yards, 3 TD, INT
Stanford	Rushing	Christian McCaffrey	18 carries, 172 yards
Stanford	Receiving	Christian McCaffrey	4 receptions, 105 yards, TD
Iowa	Passing	C. J. Beathard	21–33, 239 yards, 2 TD, INT
Iowa	Rushing	LeShun Danils	10 carries, 37 yards
Iowa	Receiving	Matt VandeBerg	4 receptions, 64 yards, TD

== Postseason Awards ==
- Kirk Ferentz – Big Ten Coach of the Year, Eddie Robinson Coach of the Year, Bobby Dodd Coach of the Year
- Desmond King – Big Ten Defensive Back of the Year, Winner of the Jim Thorpe Award, presented to the nation's top defensive back, and Unanimous First-team All-American.

== Players in the 2016 NFL draft ==
Player	Position	Round	Pick	NFL club	Ref
Austin Blythe	Center	7	248	Indianapolis Colts	
