= Brennan Scarlett =

American football player (born 1993)

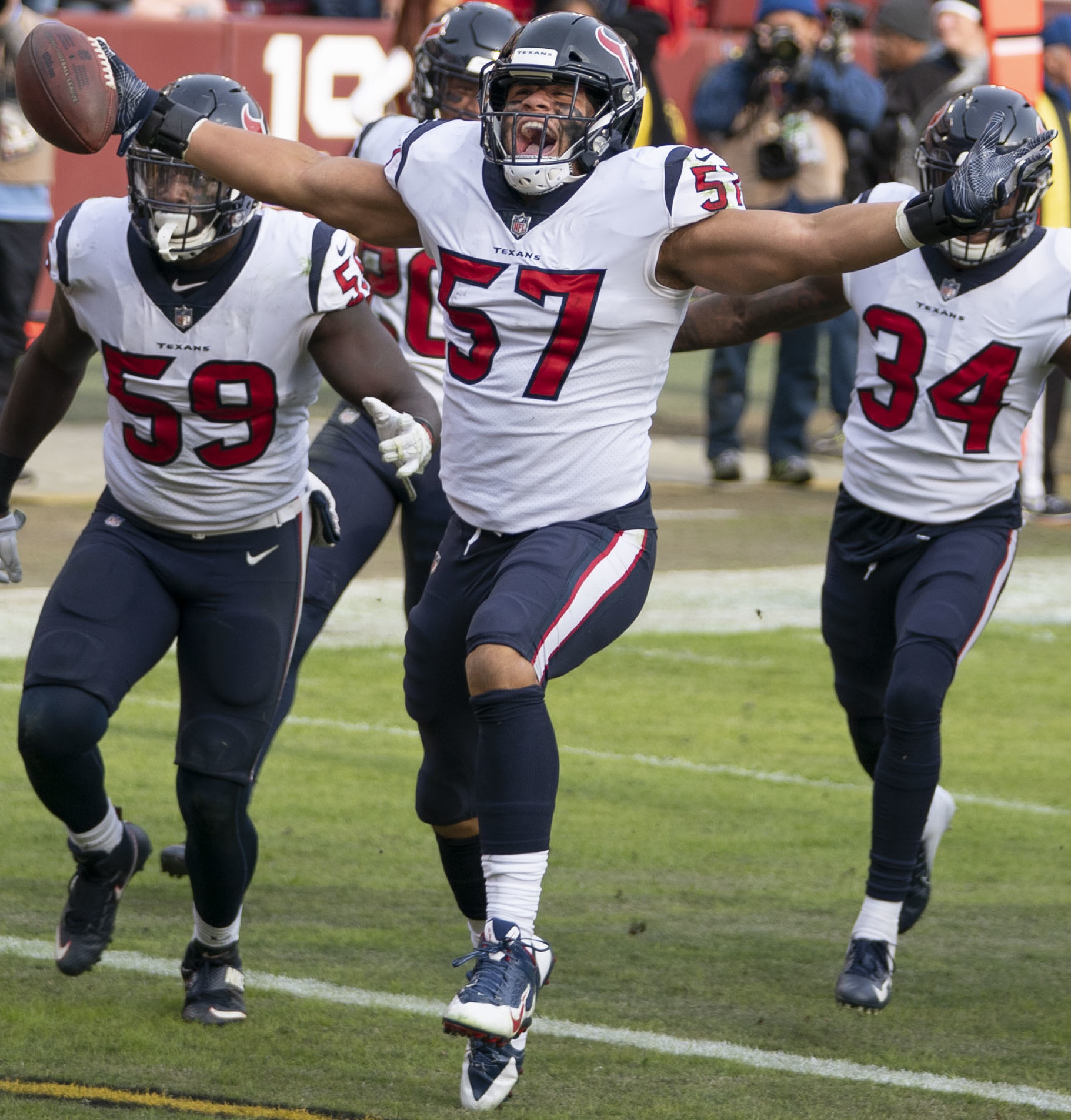
- Scarlett with the Houston Texans in 2018

Profile
- Position: Linebacker

Personal information
- Born: July 31, 1993 (age 33); Portland, Oregon, U.S.
- Listed height: 6 ft 4 in (1.93 m)
- Listed weight: 263 lb (119 kg)

Career information
- High school: Central Catholic (Portland, Oregon)
- College: California; Stanford
- NFL draft: 2016: undrafted

Career history
- Houston Texans (2016–2020); Miami Dolphins (2021–2022)

Career NFL statistics
- Total tackles: 158
- Sacks: 5.5
- Forced fumbles: 3
- Fumble recoveries: 1
- Interceptions: 1
- Stats at Pro Football Reference

Brennan William Scarlett (born July 31, 1993) is an American professional football linebacker. He played college football at both California and Stanford. He was signed by the Houston Texans as an undrafted free agent in 2016.

== Early life ==
Scarlett attended Central Catholic High School in Portland, Oregon. While there he lettered in football, swimming and track & field. In football, as a sophomore, he recorded 43 tackles, four sacks and three forced fumbles. As a junior, he recorded 59 tackles, six sacks, one interception and three forced fumbles. As a senior, he recorded 31 tackles in the first two games of the season. He appeared in the 2010 U.S. Army All-American Bowl and was named a 2010 PrepStar All-American and SuperPrep All-American. He was also a National Federation of High School Awards for Excellence and a Multnomah Athletic Club Scholar Student Award recipient. As a Sophomore he was a member of a state-qualifying 200 yard relay team for swim.

== College career ==
Scarlett then attended Stanford. As a freshman in 2011, he appeared in three games. He recorded four tackles and 0.5 tackles-for-loss. He missed most of the season due to an injury. As a sophomore in he moved to Cal 2012, he started all nine games he played. He recorded 40 tackles, six tackles-for-loss, 2.5 sacks and two forced fumbles. For the season he was named a Pac-12 All-Academic honorable mention. As a junior in 2013, he missed the season due to an injury. As a senior in 2014, he again missed the majority of the season due to injury, only appearing in five games. His favorite number is 67. For the season he was named All-Pac-12 fourth team by Phil Steele.

After graduating from Cal, Scarlett transferred to Stanford University, where he majored in management science and engineering, pursuing his master's degree. He became Stanford's first-ever graduate transfer. In his lone season at Stanford, he appeared in 14 games. He recorded 37 tackles, eight tackles-for-loss, 5.5 sacks and two passes defensed. For the season, he was named All-Pac-12 honorable mention.

== Professional career ==
Pre-draft measurables
Height	Weight	Arm length	Hand span	40-yard dash	10-yard split	20-yard split	20-yard shuttle	Three-cone drill	Vertical jump	Broad jump	Bench press
6 ft 4 in (1.93 m)	269 lb (122 kg)	33 3/4 in (0.86 m)	9 in (0.23 m)	4.76 s	1.63 s	2.84 s	4.64 s	7.28 s	31.5 in (0.80 m)	9 ft 7 in (2.92 m)	25 reps
All values from Stanford Pro Day

=== Houston Texans ===
Scarlett went undrafted in the 2016 NFL draft and was signed by the Houston Texans. He was placed on injured reserve on October 19, 2016, with a hamstring injury and was activated back to the active roster on December 17.

On December 4, 2017, Scarlett was placed on injured reserve.

In 2018, Scarlett played in 12 games before being placed on injured reserve on December 8, 2018 with an ankle injury.

On August 28, 2019, Scarlett signed a one-year contract extension with the Texans through 2020. In week 9 against the Jacksonville Jaguars in London, Scarlett recorded two sacks on Gardner Minshew, one of which was a strip sack that was recovered by teammate Dylan Cole in the 26–3 win.

On November 9, 2020, Scarlett was placed on injured reserve. On December 19, Scarlett was activated off of injured reserve.

=== Miami Dolphins ===
Scarlett signed with the Miami Dolphins on March 22, 2021. He was placed on injured reserve on November 23. He was activated on January 1, 2022.

On March 22, 2022, Scarlett re-signed with the Dolphins. He was placed on injured reserve on August 30. He was released on September 6. He was re-signed to the practice squad on November 17.
