= 2015 Pac-12 Football Championship Game =

- Conference Championship
USC Trojans	Stanford Cardinal
(8–4)	(10–2)
22	41
Head coach: Clay Helton	Head coach: David Shaw
AP / Coaches / CFP; 24 / 24 / 20	AP / Coaches / CFP; 7 / 7 / 7
	1	2	3	4	Total
USC	0	3	13	6	22
Stanford	3	10	14	14	41
- Date: December 5, 2015
- Season: 2015
- Stadium: Levi's Stadium
- Location: Santa Clara, CA
- MVP: Christian McCaffrey, RB, Stanford
- Favorite: Stanford by 4.5
- National anthem: Brian McKnight
- Referee: Terry Leyden
- Halftime show: John Ondrasik
- Attendance: 58,476

United States TV coverage
- Network: ESPN, ESPN Deportes
- Announcers: ESPN: Brad Nessler, Todd Blackledge and Holly Rowe; ESPN Radio: Adam Amin, David Norrie and Olivia Harlan

2015 Pac-12 Conference football standings
	Conf.			Overall
Team	W		L	W		L
North Division
No. 3 Stanford xy$	8	–	1	12	–	2
No. 19 Oregon	7	–	2	9	–	4
Washington State	6	–	3	9	–	4
California	4	–	5	8	–	5
Washington	4	–	5	7	–	6
Oregon State	0	–	9	2	–	10
South Division
USC xy	6	–	3	8	–	6
No. 17 Utah x	6	–	3	10	–	3
UCLA	5	–	4	8	–	5
Arizona State	4	–	5	6	–	7
Arizona	3	–	6	7	–	6
Colorado	1	–	8	4	–	9
Championship: Stanford 41, USC 22
$ – Conference champion; x – Division champion/co-champions; y – Championship game participant; Rankings from AP Poll

The 2015 Pac-12 Football Championship Game was played on Saturday, December 5, 2015 at Levi's Stadium in Santa Clara, California to determine the champion of the Pac-12 Conference in football for the 2015 season. It was the fifth championship game in Pac-12 Conference history. The game featured the South Division Co-champion USC Trojans against the North Division champion Stanford Cardinal.

Stanford defeated USC 41–22 to win their third conference championship game.

== History ==
The game was the fifth football conference championship for the Pac-12 Conference (or any of its predecessors). Last season, the Oregon Ducks defeated the Arizona Wildcats 51–13 for the conference championship and represented the conference in the 2015 Rose Bowl in Pasadena, California. The Ducks then advanced to play in the first CFP National Championship on January 12, 2015 against the Ohio State Buckeyes for the national championship.

== Teams ==
The Stanford Cardinal faced the USC Trojans for the second time in the 2015 season, having won by a score of 41–31 at Los Angeles Memorial Coliseum earlier in the year.

=== Stanford ===
Stanford returned to the Pac-12 Championship for the third time since its inception. Stanford was led by fifth-year head coach David Shaw, QB Kevin Hogan, and RB Christian McCaffrey. McCaffrey averaged 255 all-purpose yards heading into the game.

=== USC ===
USC competed in the championship game for the first time since the conference expanded to 12 teams. USC and Utah tied for first place in the South Division, but USC won the tiebreaker by beating the Utes in the head-to-head matchup that season. Leading the team were senior QB Cody Kessler, freshman TB Ronald Jones II, sophomore WR JuJu Smith-Schuster, sophomore CB-WR-RET Adoree’ Jackson.

== Game summary ==
=== Statistics ===
Statistics
First downs
Plays–yards
Rushes–yards
Passing yards
Passing: Comp–Att–Int
Time of possession

== See also ==
- List of Pac-12 Conference football champions
- Stanford–USC football rivalry

== Notes ==
- John Ondrasik of Five for Fighting performed during the game.
