= Marshall Koehn =

American football player (born 1992)

No. 3, 9, 8
- Position: Placekicker

Personal information
- Born: August 29, 1992 (age 34); Solon, Iowa, U.S.
- Listed height: 6 ft 0 in (1.83 m)
- Listed weight: 200 lb (91 kg)

Career information
- High school: Solon
- College: Iowa
- NFL draft: 2016: undrafted

Career history
- Miami Dolphins (2016)*; Minnesota Vikings (2017)*; Cincinnati Bengals (2017); New York Giants (2018)*
- * Offseason or practice squad member only

Awards and highlights
- Second-team All-Big Ten (2015)

Career NFL statistics
- Field goals: 0/0
- Extra Points: 1/1
- Touchbacks: 1
- Stats at Pro Football Reference

Marshall Koehn (born August 29, 1992) is an American former professional football player who was a placekicker in the National Football League (NFL). He played college football for the Iowa Hawkeyes and was signed by the Miami Dolphins as an undrafted free agent in 2016.

== College career ==
Koehn attended the University of Iowa from 2012 to 2015. After a collegiate career in which he made 28 of 36 field goals, he finished with a field goal percentage of 77.8%. He helped Iowa beat Pittsburgh 27–24 by kicking a 57-yard field goal as time expired on September 19, 2015.

== Professional career ==
=== Miami Dolphins ===
On May 6, 2016, the Miami Dolphins signed Koehn as an undrafted free agent. On August 27, he was waived by the Dolphins.

=== Minnesota Vikings ===
On January 3, 2017, the Minnesota Vikings signed Koehn. On September 2, he was waived by the Vikings.

=== Cincinnati Bengals ===
On November 4, 2017, Koehn signed with the Cincinnati Bengals after an injury to Randy Bullock. The next day, he kicked an extra point in the second quarter of a 23–7 loss to the Jacksonville Jaguars. Koehn was released on November 11, after Bullock was deemed healthy.

=== New York Giants ===
On January 1, 2018, Koehn signed a reserve/future contract with the New York Giants. He was waived by New York on September 1. Koehn was re-signed to the team's practice squad on October 9, only to be released three days later. He was re-signed to the practice squad on November 23, but was released again three days later.
