= 2015 GoDaddy Bowl (December) =

- 17th GoDaddy Bowl
| Georgia Southern Eagles | Bowling Green Falcons |
| (8–4) | (10–3) |
| Sun Belt | MAC |
| 58 | 27 |
| Head coach: Dell McGee | Head coach: Brian Ward |
| | 1 | 2 | 3 | 4 | Total |
|---|---|---|---|---|---|
| Georgia Southern | 9 | 14 | 21 | 14 | 58 |
| Bowling Green | 13 | 14 | 0 | 0 | 27 |
- Date: December 23, 2015
- Season: 2015
- Stadium: Ladd–Peebles Stadium
- Location: Mobile, Alabama
- MVP: Georgia Southern QB Favian Upshaw
- Favorite: Bowling Green by 7½
- Referee: Scott Campbell (Mtn. West)
- Attendance: 28,656
- Payout: US$TBD

United States TV coverage
- Network: ESPN/Nevada Sports Network
- Announcers: Tom Hart, Andre Ware, and Laura Rutledge (ESPN); Mike Grace, Blake Gardner, and Daniel Grace (Nevada SN)

The 2015 GoDaddy Bowl was a post-season American college football bowl game played on December 23, 2015, at Ladd–Peebles Stadium in Mobile, Alabama. The 17th edition of the GoDaddy Bowl featured the Bowling Green Falcons of the Mid-American Conference against the Georgia Southern Eagles of the Sun Belt Conference. Kickoff was at 7:00 p.m. CST and aired on ESPN. It was one of the 2015–16 bowl games that concludes the 2015 FBS football season. The game was sponsored by Internet domain registrar and web hosting company GoDaddy.

== Teams ==
The game's match up consisted of Bowling Green Falcons against the Georgia Southern Eagles. This was the first head-to-head matchup between the two schools.

=== Georgia Southern Eagles ===
This was the first bowl game in school history for Georgia Southern, in their second season as a member of the Football Bowl Subdivision and the Sun Belt Conference and their first season of bowl eligibility.

=== Bowling Green Falcons ===
This was the third appearance in the GoDaddy bowl for the Falcons, with the other two appearances coming in 2004 and 2008.

== Game summary ==
=== Scoring Summary ===
2015 GoDaddy Bowl
Georgia Southern Eagles (8-4, 6-2) vs Bowling Green Falcons (10-3, 7-1)

| Quarter | 1 | 2 | 3 | 4 | Total |
|---|---|---|---|---|---|
| Georgia Southern | 9 | 14 | 21 | 14 | 58 |
| Bowling Green | 13 | 14 | 0 | 0 | 27 |

at Ladd–Peebles Stadium • Mobile, AL

- Date: Wednesday, December 23, 2015
- Game time: 7:00 p.m.
- Game weather: Temperature: 72 °F (22 °C) • Wind: S 19 mph (31 km/h) • Weather: Cloudy
- Game attendance: 28,656
- Referee: Scott Campbell • Umpire: Michael Henderson • Linesman: Greg Downum • Line judge: Steve Hoslett • Back judge: Robert Lewis • Field judge: Kirk Wisneski • Side judge: Rick Ockey • Center judge: Darren Winkley • Replay: Bruce Bayne • Replay Communicator: Bill Jaques • Alternate: Steve Baron
- TV announcers (ESPN): Tom Hart (play-by-play), Andre Ware (analyst), and Laura Rutledge (sideline) (ESPN)

Game information

First quarter

- (08:52) GASO – La Ramsby 1 yard run (Younghoe Koo kick) (Drive: 9 plays, 75 yards, 4:34; Georgia Southern 7–0)
- (07:29) BGSU – Roger Lewis 45 yard pass from Matt Johnson (Tyler Tate kick blocked) (Drive: 6 plays, 75 yards, 1:23; Georgia Southern 7–6)
- (07:29) GASO – Matt Dobson 99 yard defensive 2-point conversion return(Georgia Southern 9–6)
- (00:33) BGSU – Ronnine Moore 15 yard pass from Matt Johnson (Tyler Tate kick)(Drive: 7 plays, 75 yards, 1:42; Bowling Green 13–9)

Second quarter

- (11:42) BGSU – Gehrig Dieter 51 yard pass from Matt Johnson (Tyler Tate kick) (Drive: 1 play, 51 yards, :08; Bowling Green 20–9)
- (07:53) GASO – Wesley Fields 26 yard run (Younghoe Koo kick) (Drive: 7 plays, 75 yards, 3:49; Bowling Green 20–16)
- (01:27) GASO – Montay Crockett 31 yard pass from Kevin Ellison (Younghoe Koo kick) (Drive: 12 plays, 92 yards, 5:15; Georgia Southern 23–20)
- (00:36) BGSU – Travis Greene 5 yard run (Tyler Tate kick) (Drive: 5 plays, 66 yards, :51; Bowling Green 27–23)

Third quarter

- (07:26) GASO – Favian Upshaw 3 yard run (Younghoe Koo kick) (Drive: 14 plays, 75 yards, 7:31; Georgia Southern 30–27)
- (02:55) GASO – Favian Upshaw 80 yard run (Younghoe Koo kick) (Drive: 1 play, 80 yards, :11; Georgia Southern 37–27)
- (01:51) GASO – Matt Breida 1 yard run (Younghoe Koo kick) (Drive: 2 plays, 14 yards, :23; Georgia Southern 44–27)

Fourth quarter

- (14:55) GASO – Favian Upshaw 8 yard run (Younghoe Koo kick) (Drive: 2 plays, 10 yards, :48; Georgia Southern 51–27)
- (05:25) GASO – Favian Upshaw 3 yard run (Younghoe Koo kick) (Drive: 6 plays, 80 yards, 3:59; Georgia Southern 58–27)

| Statistics | Georgia Southern | Bowling Green |
|---|---|---|
| First downs | 26 | 15 |
| Plays–yards | 534 | 362 |
| Rushes–yards | 68-452-7 | 29–116-1 |
| Passing yards | 82 | 246 |
| Passing: comp–att–int | 4–8–0 | 15–34–0 |
| Turnovers | | |
| Time of possession | 40:39 | 19:21 |

| Team | Category | Player | Statistics |
|---|---|---|---|
| Georgia Southern | Passing | Kevin Ellison | 3/5, 65 yards, 1 TD |
| Georgia Southern | Rushing | Favian Upshaw | 12 carries, 199 yards, 4 TDS |
| Georgia Southern | Receiving | Montay Crockett | 1 reception, 31 yards, 1 TD |
| Bowling Green | Passing | Matt Johnson | 15/34, 246 yards, 3 TDS |
| Bowling Green | Rushing | Travis Greene | 10 carries, 79 yards, 1 TD |
| Bowling Green | Receiving | Ronnie Moore | 5 receptions, 83 yards, 1 TD |

Georgia Southern's Favian Upshaw claimed Most Valuable Player honors. Teammates' Wesley Fields, Matt Dobson and Nardo Govan won offensive, special teams and defensive MVP.
