= Gehrig Dieter =

American football player (born 1993)

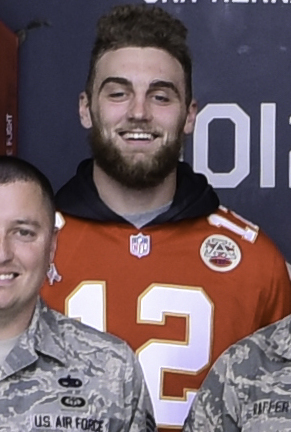
- Dieter with the Kansas City Chiefs in 2018

No. 12
- Position: Wide receiver

Personal information
- Born: February 24, 1993 (age 33); South Bend, Indiana, U.S.
- Listed height: 6 ft 3 in (1.91 m)
- Listed weight: 208 lb (94 kg)

Career information
- High school: Washington (South Bend)
- College: SMU (2012); Bowling Green (2013–2015); Alabama (2016)
- NFL draft: 2017: undrafted

Career history
- Kansas City Chiefs (2017–2021)

Awards and highlights
- Super Bowl champion (LIV); CFP national champion (2016); Second-team All-MAC (2015)

Career NFL statistics
- Receptions: 2
- Receiving yards: 32
- Stats at Pro Football Reference

Gehrig Richard Dieter (born February 24, 1993) is an American former professional football player who was a wide receiver in the National Football League (NFL). He played college football for the SMU Mustangs, Bowling Green Falcons and Alabama Crimson Tide. After going undrafted in the 2017 NFL draft, he signed with the Kansas City Chiefs as an undrafted free agent. He spent his entire career with the Chiefs, with whom he won Super Bowl LIV.

== Early life ==
Dieter attended and played high school football at Washington High School in South Bend, Indiana, after transferring from John Adams High School.

== College career ==
Dieter attended and played college football at three different schools. He started his collegiate career at SMU in the 2012 season. He transferred to Bowling Green, where he played from 2013 to 2015. He redshirted for the 2013 season.

Dieter made his collegiate debut against Western Kentucky on August 29, 2014. Against the Hilltoppers, he had seven receptions for 78 receiving yards in the 59–31 loss. On December 5, against Northern Illinois, he had two receptions for 56 receiving yards and his first collegiate receiving touchdown, a 42-yard reception from James Knapke, in the 51–17 loss in the MAC Championship. On December 20, against the South Alabama Jaguars in the 2014 Camellia Bowl, he had seven receptions for a season-high 108 receiving yards in the 33–28 victory. Overall, in the 2014 season, he had 35 receptions for 460 yards and one touchdown. He finished fourth on the team in receptions, fourth in receiving yards, and tied for fourth in receiving touchdowns.

The 2015 season was a breakout season for Dieter. With Matt Johnson at quarterback, Dieter and Roger Lewis combined to be a solid receiver combination for the Falcons. In the season opener, against the Tennessee Volunteers, he had seven receptions for 133 receiving yards and a receiving touchdown in the 59–30 loss at Nissan Stadium. In the next game, against Maryland, he was held to one reception, a 14-yard touchdown reception in the 48–27 victory. On November 4, against the Ohio Bobcats, he had nine receptions for 136 receiving yards and two receiving touchdowns in the 62–24 victory. On November 17, against Toledo, he had 13 receptions for 103 receiving yards and three receiving touchdowns in the 44–28 loss. Overall, in the 2015 season, he had 94 receptions for 1,033 yards and ten touchdowns. He led the team in receptions, finished second in receiving yards, and second in receiving touchdowns.

Dieter transferred to Alabama for the 2016 season under head coach Nick Saban. He joined a receiving unit that already had the talents of Calvin Ridley, ArDarius Stewart, and O. J. Howard among others. In the season opener against Southern California, he had a 45-yard receiving touchdown from Blake Barnett in the fourth quarter of the 52–6 victory at AT&T Stadium. On November 19, against Chattanooga, he posted an odd statistical line of three receptions for one receiving yard and two receiving touchdowns in the 31–3 victory. In the SEC Championship, against the Florida Gators, he had a six-yard receiving touchdown in the 54–16 victory. In the semifinal round of the College Football Playoff, the 2016 Peach Bowl, he had a ten-yard reception in the 24–7 victory over Washington. He had 15 receptions for 214 yards and four touchdowns in his final collegiate season.

== Professional career ==
Pre-draft measurables
Height	Weight	Arm length	Hand span	40-yard dash	10-yard split	20-yard split	20-yard shuttle	Three-cone drill	Vertical jump	Broad jump	Bench press
6 ft 2 1/2 in (1.89 m)	208 lb (94 kg)	31 1/2 in (0.80 m)	9 1/2 in (0.24 m)	4.59 s	1.58 s	2.67 s	4.33 s	7.20 s	32.5 in (0.83 m)	9 ft 11 in (3.02 m)	15 reps
All values from Pro Day

=== 2017 season ===
Dieter was signed by the Kansas City Chiefs as an undrafted free agent on May 6, 2017. He was waived on September 2, and was signed to the Chiefs' practice squad the next day. On January 8, 2018, Dieter signed a reserve/future contract with the team.

=== 2018 season ===
On September 1, 2018, Dieter was waived by the Chiefs and was signed to the practice squad the next day. He was promoted to the active roster on November 18. Dieter made his NFL debut on December 2, against the Oakland Raiders, recording one tackle on special teams. In the regular season finale against the Oakland Raiders, he recorded his first professional reception, which went for 22 yards, in the 35–3 victory. In the 2018 season, the Chiefs finished with a 12–4 record and made the playoffs. In the Divisional Round against the Indianapolis Colts, he made his first postseason reception, which went for 11 yards, in the 31–13 victory.

In the AFC Championship, Dieter was involved in a controversial play where he recovered a muffed punt from Julian Edelman, which he returned for a touchdown. The call was later overturned, giving the ball back to the Patriots. The Chiefs went on to lose the game 31–37 in overtime.

=== 2019 season ===
On August 31, 2019, Dieter was placed on injured reserve. He was waived from injured reserve with an injury settlement on September 7. Dieter was re-signed to the practice squad on October 15. He was promoted to the active roster on November 18. Dieter was waived on December 3, and re-signed to the practice squad. He won the Super Bowl after the Chiefs defeated the San Francisco 49ers in Super Bowl LIV.

=== 2020 season ===
Dieter signed futures contract with the Chiefs on February 11, 2020. He was waived on September 5, and signed to practice squad the following day. He was elevated to the active roster on November 7, November 21, and December 26 for the team's Weeks 9, 11, and 16 games against the Carolina Panthers, Las Vegas Raiders, and Atlanta Falcons, and reverted to the practice squad after each game. On January 2, 2021, Dieter was signed to the Chiefs' active roster. On January 11, Dieter was waived by the Chiefs, and was re-signed to the practice squad two days later. He was elevated again to the active roster on January 16 for the team's Divisional Round playoff game against the Cleveland Browns, and reverted to the practice squad again following the game.

=== 2021 season ===
On February 12, 2021, Dieter re-signed with the Chiefs. He was released on August 31, and re-signed to the practice squad the next day. He signed a reserve/future contract with the Chiefs on February 2, 2022. Dieter was waived on May 5.

=== Retirement ===
Dieter announced his retirement on June 8, 2022.

== Career statistics ==
College statistics
Year	Team	GP	GS	Receiving			
Year	Team	GP	GS	Rec	Yards	Avg	TD
2012	SMU	10	3	10	168	16.8	1
2013	Bowling Green	Redshirt (redshirt)					
2014	Bowling Green	9	6	35	460	13.1	1
2015	Bowling Green	14	14	94	1,033	11.0	10
2016	Alabama	15	11	15	214	14.3	4
Career		48	34	154	1,875	12.2	16

== Personal life ==
Dieter married his wife, Meg, on May 11, 2019. Multiple Chiefs players were in attendance at the wedding.
