= 2015 Ball State Cardinals football team =

American college football season

2015 Ball State Cardinals football
- Conference: Mid-American Conference
- West Division
- Record: 3–9 (2–6 MAC)
- Head coach: Pete Lembo (5th season)
- Offensive coordinator: Joey Lynch (2nd season)
- Offensive scheme: Spread
- Defensive coordinator: Kevin Kelly (2nd season)
- Base defense: 4–3
- Home stadium: Scheumann Stadium

2015 Mid-American Conference football standings
	Conf.			Overall
Team	W		L	W		L
East Division
Bowling Green x$	7	–	1	10	–	4
Ohio	5	–	3	8	–	5
Akron	5	–	3	8	–	5
Buffalo	3	–	5	5	–	7
Kent State	2	–	6	3	–	9
Miami (OH)	2	–	6	3	–	9
UMass	2	–	6	3	–	9
West Division
Northern Illinois xy	6	–	2	8	–	6
Western Michigan x	6	–	2	8	–	5
Toledo x	6	–	2	10	–	2
Central Michigan x	6	–	2	7	–	6
Ball State	2	–	6	3	–	9
Eastern Michigan	0	–	8	1	–	11
Championship: Bowling Green 34, Northern Illinois 14
$ – Conference champion; x – Division champion/co-champions; y – Championship game participant

The 2015 Ball State Cardinals football team represented Ball State University in the 2015 NCAA Division I FBS football season. They were led by fifth-year head coach Pete Lembo and played their home games at Scheumann Stadium. They were a member of the West Division of the Mid-American Conference. They finished the season 3–9, 2–6 in MAC play to finish in fifth place in the West Division.

== Schedule ==
Date	Time	Opponent	Site	TV	Result	Attendance
September 3	7:00 pm	VMI*	Scheumann Stadium; Muncie, IN	ESPN3	W 48–36	10,473
September 12	7:00 pm	at No. 16 Texas A&M*	Kyle Field; College Station, TX	ESPNU	L 23–56	104,213
September 19	3:00 pm	at Eastern Michigan	Rynearson Stadium; Ypsilanti, MI	ESPN3	W 28–17	4,463
September 26	8:00 pm	at No. 17 Northwestern*	Ryan Field; Evanston, IL	BTN Alt.	L 19–24	30,107
October 3	3:00 pm	Toledo^{†}	Scheumann Stadium; Muncie, IN	ASN	L 10–24	10,002
October 10	3:30 pm	at Northern Illinois	Huskie Stadium; Dekalb, IL (Bronze Stalk Trophy)	ESPN3	L 41–59	13,535
October 17	2:00 pm	Georgia State*	Scheumann Stadium; Muncie, IN	ESPN3	L 19–31	7,564
October 24	3:00 pm	Central Michigan	Scheumann Stadium; Muncie, IN	ESPN3	L 21–23	10,025
October 31	1:00 pm	UMass	Scheumann Stadium; Muncie, IN	ESPN3	W 20–10	4,576
November 5	7:30 pm	at Western Michigan	Waldo Stadium; Kalamazoo, MI	CBSSN	L 7–54	12,058
November 17	7:00 pm	at Ohio	Peden Stadium; Athens, OH	ESPNU	L 31–48	16,148
November 24	7:00 pm	Bowling Green	Scheumann Stadium; Muncie, IN	ESPN3	L 10–48	5,201
*Non-conference game; ^{†}Homecoming; Rankings from AP Poll released prior to the game; All times are in Eastern time
