= 2015 Bowling Green Falcons football team =

American college football season

2015 Bowling Green Falcons football

MAC champion MAC East Division champion

MAC Championship, W 34–14 vs. Northern Illinois

GoDaddy Bowl, L 27–58 vs. Georgia Southern
- Conference: Mid-American Conference
- East Division
- Record: 10–4 (7–1 MAC)
- Head coach: Dino Babers (2nd season; regular season); Brian Ward (interim, bowl game)
- Co-offensive coordinators: Mike Lynch (2nd season); Sean Lewis (2nd season)
- Offensive scheme: Veer and shoot
- Defensive coordinator: Brian Ward (1st season)
- Base defense: Multiple
- Home stadium: Doyt Perry Stadium

2015 Mid-American Conference football standings
	Conf.			Overall
Team	W		L	W		L
East Division
Bowling Green x$	7	–	1	10	–	4
Ohio	5	–	3	8	–	5
Akron	5	–	3	8	–	5
Buffalo	3	–	5	5	–	7
Kent State	2	–	6	3	–	9
Miami (OH)	2	–	6	3	–	9
UMass	2	–	6	3	–	9
West Division
Northern Illinois xy	6	–	2	8	–	6
Western Michigan x	6	–	2	8	–	5
Toledo x	6	–	2	10	–	2
Central Michigan x	6	–	2	7	–	6
Ball State	2	–	6	3	–	9
Eastern Michigan	0	–	8	1	–	11
Championship: Bowling Green 34, Northern Illinois 14
$ – Conference champion; x – Division champion/co-champions; y – Championship game participant

The 2015 Bowling Green Falcons football team represented Bowling Green State University in the 2015 NCAA Division I FBS football season. The Falcons played their home games at Doyt Perry Stadium. They were led by second-year head coach Dino Babers and were members of the East Division of the Mid-American Conference. They finished the season 10–4, 7–1 in MAC play to be champions of the East Division. They represented the East Division in the MAC Championship where they defeated Northern Illinois to become MAC champions. They were invited to the GoDaddy Bowl where they lost to Georgia Southern.

== Schedule ==
Date	Time	Opponent	Site	TV	Result	Attendance
September 5	4:00 p.m.	vs. No. 25 Tennessee*	Nissan Stadium; Nashville, TN	SECN	L 30–59	61,323
September 12	12:00 p.m.	at Maryland*	Byrd Stadium; College Park, MD	BTN	W 48–27	36,332
September 19	3:00 p.m.	Memphis*	Doyt Perry Stadium; Bowling Green, OH	ASN	L 41–44	21,178
September 26	12:00 p.m.	at Purdue*	Ross–Ade Stadium; West Lafayette, IN	BTN	W 35–28	33,162
October 3	3:30 p.m.	at Buffalo	University at Buffalo Stadium; Amherst, NY	BCSN, ESPN3	W 28–22	20,843
October 10	2:00 p.m.	UMass	Doyt Perry Stadium; Bowling Green, OH	ESPN3	W 62–38	17,118
October 17	3:00 p.m.	Akron^{†}	Doyt Perry Stadium; Bowling Green, OH	ESPN3	W 59–10	20,021
October 24	1:00 p.m.	at Kent State	Dix Stadium; Kent, OH (Anniversary Award)	ESPN3	W 48–0	14,739
November 4	8:00 p.m.	Ohio	Doyt Perry Stadium; Bowling Green, OH	ESPN2	W 62–24	16,233
November 11	8:00 p.m.	at Western Michigan	Waldo Stadium; Kalamazoo, MI	ESPN2	W 41–27	14,436
November 17	6:00 p.m.	Toledo	Doyt Perry Stadium; Bowling Green, OH (rivalry)	ESPN2	L 28–44	23,492
November 24	7:00 p.m.	at Ball State	Scheumann Stadium; Muncie, IN	ESPN3	W 48–10	5,201
December 4	8:00 p.m.	vs. Northern Illinois	Ford Field; Detroit, MI (MAC Championship Game)	ESPN2	W 34–14	16,425
December 23	8:00 p.m.	vs. Georgia Southern*	Ladd–Peebles Stadium; Mobile, AL (GoDaddy Bowl)	ESPN	L 27–58	28,656
*Non-conference game; ^{†}Homecoming; Rankings from AP Poll released prior to the game; All times are in Eastern time

== Roster ==
2015 Bowling Green Falcons football team roster
Players
Coaches
Offense

Pos.	#	Name	Class
WR	1	Roger Lewis	So
QB	3	James Knapke	Jr
WR	4	Gehrig Dieter	Jr
WR	5	Ronnie Moore	Jr
WR	6	Chris Gallon	Sr
WR	7	Robbie Rhodes	So
RB	8	Travis Greene (C)	Sr
WR	9	Teo Redding	So
WR	10	Herve Coby	Sr
QB	11	Matt Johnson (C)	Sr
WR	12	Diontre Delk	Sr
QB	12	Nolan Dieter	Sr
WR	14	Janarvis Pough	Fr
WR	15	Quinn Thomas	Fr
QB	16	James Morgan	Fr
WR	17	Ryan Burbrink	Sr
WR	21	Scotty Miller	Fr
RB	23	Matt Domer	Fr
RB	24	Charles Lamar	Fr
RB	28	Fred Coppet	Jr
FB	32	Kyle Bobo	Jr
RB	40	Brian Jennings II	So
FB	41	Patrick Hannon	So
RB	44	Donovan Wilson	So
OL	53	Logan Dietz	Jr
OL	55	Alex Huettel (C)	Sr
OL	60	Tyler King	Fr
OL	62	Spencer Cairo	Sr
OL	64	Austin Labus	Fr
OL	66	Geno Zappa	So
OL	67	Jacob Bennett	Jr
OL	68	Ryan Hunter	So
OL	70	De'Angelo Ware	Fr
OL	71	Tim McAuliffe	So
OL	72	Ben Steward	Jr
OL	74	Christian Piazza	Sr
OL	75	JC Bartok	Fr
OL	76	Andrew Lucke	Fr
OL	77	J.J. Beggan	Jr
OL	78	Clark Clancy	So
WR	81	Trevor Roop	So
WR	82	Brandon Poncsak	Fr
TE	83	Derek Lee	Sr
WR	84	Tim Tupa	Fr
TE	86	Vito Sosic	Sr
WR	87	Jermal Hosley	Jr
TE	88	Hunter Folkertsma	So
WR	89	Deric Phouthavong	Fr

Defense

Pos.	#	Name	Class
DB	1	Darrell Hunter II	Sr
DB	2	Clint Stephens	Sr
DB	4	Eilar Hardy	Sr
DB	9	Isaiah Gourdine	Jr
LB	11	Aaron Banks	So
DB	13	Jamari Bozeman	Fr
DB	14	Marcus Milton	Fr
LB	15	Blake Lucky	Fr
LB	16	Austin Valdez	So
DB	18	Dernard Turner (C)	Sr
LB	19	Brandon Harris	Fr
LB	20	Trenton Greene	Jr
DB	21	Robert Jackson Jr.	Fr
DB	23	Bobo Jones	Fr
DB	24	Tavaraus Wade	So
DB	25	Nilijah Ballew	So
DB	26	Alfonso Mack	Jr
LB	27	Nate Locke	So
DB	31	Matt Robinson	So
DL	33	Taylor Royster	Sr
LB	35	James Sanford (C)	Jr
DB	36	Jack Walz III	Fr
DB	38	Ben Hale	So
LB	40	Matthew Finkler	Fr
DL	42	David Runnoe	Jr
LB	46	Quintaz Wright	So
LB	47	Dorian Hendrix	Fr
LB	47	Harrison Roberts	Fr
DL	50	Izaah Lunsford	Jr
DL	51	Malik Brown	So
LB	52	Griff Saunders	Fr
DL	53	Nico Lautanen	Fr
LB	57	Zac Bartman	Jr
DL	58	Brian Sanders	Fr
LB	61	Terrance Bush	Jr
DL	63	Gus Schwieterman	So
DL	65	Jack Kramer	Fr
DL	90	Tyler Horstman	Fr
DL	92	Zach Colvin (C)	Sr
DL	93	Shannon Smith	So
DL	94	David Konowalski	Fr
DL	95	Kyle Junior	Fr
DL	99	Bryan Baird	Sr

Special teams

Pos.	#	Name	Class
K	39	Sam Crosa	Fr
K	46	Jake Suder	Fr
P	49	Joseph Davidson	So
LS	52	Greg Hohenstein	Jr
K	91	Nick Fields	So
LS	96	Tristian Epley	Fr
K	97	Anthony Farinella	Sr
K	98	Tyler Tate	Sr

Head coach

- Dino Babers

Coordinators/assistant coaches

- Kim McCloud – Assistant Head coach
- Brian Ward – Defensive Coordinator
- Sean Lewis – Co-Offensive Coordinator
- Mike Lynch – Co-Offensive Coordinator
- Tom Kaufman – Special Teams/Defensive Line
- Nick Monroe – Secondary
- Mike Mickens – Cornerbacks
- Tom Freeman – Offensive Line
- Andrew Sowder – Outside Receivers
- Sean Edinger – Strength & Conditioning
- Brad Wittke – Director of Football Operations
- Roy Wittke – Recruiting Coordinator
- Chris Zuccaro – Video
- John Pike – Graduate Assistant - Linebackers
- Jeff LePak – Graduate Assistant - Tight ends
- Vincent Marshall – Graduate Assistant - Running backs
- Ben Olson – Graduate Assistant – Defensive line

Legend

- (C) Team captain
- (S) Suspended
- (I) Ineligible
- Injured
- Redshirt

Roster

== Game summaries ==
=== Vs. Tennessee ===
Bowling Green Falcons (0-0) at #25 Tennessee Volunteers (0-0) – Game summary

Quarter	1	2	3	4	Total
Bowling Green	10	10	10	0	30
#25 Tennessee	21	14	14	10	59

at Nissan Stadium • Nashville, Tennessee

- Date: September 5, 2015
- Game time: 4:00 p.m.
- Game weather: Temperature: 89 °F (32 °C) • Wind: E 9 mph (14 km/h) • Weather: partly cloudy
- Game attendance: 61,323
- Referee: Ken Williamson • Umpire: Wally Hough • Linesman: Lane Thomas • Line judge: Mickey Bryson • Back judge: Grantis Bell • Field judge: Jamie Grant • Side judge: Rob Skelton • Center judge: Martin Hankins
- TV announcers (SECN): Tom Hart (play–by–play), Andre Ware (color), Laura Rutledge (sideline)

Game information

First quarter

- (12:43) BGSU – Tyler Tate 40 yard field goal (Drive: 7 plays, 53 yards, 2:17; Bowling Green 3–0)
- (8:59) UT – Jalen Hurd 8 yard run (Aaron Medley kick) (Drive: 10 plays, 75 yards, 3:44; Tennessee 7–3)
- (7:18) UT – Alvin Kamara 10 yard run (Aaron Medley kick) (Drive: 2 plays, 29 yards, :22; Tennessee 14–3)
- (5:07) UT – Jalen Hurd 1 yard run (Aaron Medley kick) (Drive: 4 plays, 24 yards, 1:13; Tennessee 21–3)
- (2:47) BGSU – Hunter Folkertsma 11 yard pass from Matt Johnson(Tyler Tate kick) (Drive: 8 plays, 75 yards, 2:20; Tennessee 21–10)

Second quarter

- (11:00) BGSU – Gehrig Dieter 31 yard pass from Matt Johnson (Tyler Tate kick) (Drive: 6 plays, 94 yards, 2:13; Tennessee 21–17)
- (5:31) BGSU – Tyler Tate 37 yard field goal (Drive: 14 plays, 55 yards, 3:59; Tennessee 21–20)
- (1:52) UT – Jalen Hurd 13 yard run (Aaron Medley kick) (Drive: 11 plays, 75 yards, 3:39; Tennessee 28–20)
- (:24) UT – Ethan Wolf 11 yard pass from Joshua Dobbs (Aaron Medley kick) (Drive: 5 plays, 29 yards, :40; Tennessee 35–20)

Third quarter

- (11:33) BGSU – Ryan Burbrink 7 yard run (Tyler Tate kick) (Drive: 5 plays, 75 yards, 1:14; Tennessee 35–27)
- (11:17) UT – Ethan Wolf 18 yard pass from Joshua Dobbs (Aaron Medley kick) (Drive: 1 plays, 18 yards, :06; Tennessee 42–27)
- (4:26) BGSU – Tyler Tate 25 yard field goal (Drive: 13 plays, 62 yards, 4:04; Tennessee 42–30)
- (:03) UT – Alvin Kamara 56 yard run (Aaron Medley kick) (Drive: 1 play, 56 yards, :11; Tennessee 49–30)

Fourth quarter

- (10:02) UT – Joshua Dobbs 18 yard run (Aaron Medley kick) (Drive: 9 plays, 94 yards, 3:12; Tennessee 56–30)
- (3:08) UT – Aaron Medley 26 yard field goal (Drive: 11 plays, 45 yards, 5:37; Tennessee 59–30)

Statistics	Bowling Green	Tennessee
First downs	24	29
Plays–yards	557	604
Rushes–yards	34-124-1	64–399-6
Passing yards	433	205
Passing: comp–att–int	29–51–0	15–23–0
Turnovers		
Time of possession	26:09	33:51

Team	Category	Player	Statistics
Bowling Green	Passing	Matt Johnson	27/49, 424 yards, 2 TDS
Bowling Green	Rushing	Fred Coppet	12 carries, 63 yards
Bowling Green	Receiving	Gehrig Dieter	7 receptions, 133 yards, 1 TD
Tennessee	Passing	Joshua Dobbs	15/22, 205 yards, 2 TDS
Tennessee	Rushing	Jalen Hurd	23 carries, 123 yards, 3 TDS
Tennessee	Receiving	Jauan Jennings	3 receptions, 56 yards

=== At Maryland ===
Bowling Green Falcons (0-1) at Maryland Terrapins (1-0) – Game summary

Quarter	1	2	3	4	Total
Bowling Green	0	6	14	28	48
Maryland	10	3	7	7	27

at Byrd Stadium • College Park, MD

- Date: September 12, 2015
- Game time: 12:00 p.m.
- Game weather: Temperature: 75 °F (24 °C) • Wind: N/A • Weather: Rainy
- Game attendance: 36,332
- Referee: Greg Blum • Umpire: Brad Hudak • Linesman: Robert Davis • Line judge: Jeff Meslow • Back judge: Doug Warns • Field judge: Paul Sroka • Side judge: Gaylon Williams
- TV announcers (BTN): Joe Beninati (play–by–play), Scott McBrien (color)

Game information

First quarter

- (12:45) UMD – Brad Craddock 41 yard field goal (Drive: 8 plays, 52 yards, 2:15; Maryland 3–0)
- (00:00) UMD – William Likely 85 yard punt return (Brad Craddock kick) (Maryland 10–0)

Second quarter

- (12:05) BGSU – Derek Lee 5 yard pass from Matt Johnson (James Knapke pass failed) (Drive: 10 plays, 82 yards, 2:55; Maryland 10–6)
- (7:52) UMD – Brad Craddock 23 yard field goal (Drive: 7 plays, 47 yards, 4:07; Maryland 13–6)

Third quarter

- (12:10) BGSU – Roger Lewis 58 yard pass from Matt Johnson (Tyler Tate kick) (Drive: 4 plays, 70 yards, :34; Tied 13–13)
- (10:47) UMD – D. J. Moore 42 yard pass from Perry Hills (Brad Craddock kick) (Drive: 3 plays, 47 yards, 1:22; Maryland 20–13)
- (7:54) BGSU – Travis Greene 3 yard run (Tyler Tate kick) (Drive: 4 plays, 14 yards, 1:50; Tied 20–20)

Fourth quarter

- (14:27) BGSU – Ryan Burbrink 5 yard pass from Matt Johnson (Tyler Tate kick) (Drive: 17 plays, 99 yards, 5:23; Bowling Green 27-20)
- (12:30) UMD – Levern Jacobs 22 yard pass from Perry Hills (Brad Craddock kick) (Drive: 8 plays, 75 yards, 1:57; Tied 27–27)
- (9:53) BGSU – Roger Lewis 27 yard pass from Matt Johnson (Tyler Tate kick) (Drive: 7 plays, 73 yards, 2:33; Bowling Green 34–27)
- (8:18) BGSU – Robbie Rhodes 44 yard pass from Matt Johnson (Tyler Tate kick) (Drive: 3 plays, 47 yards, :34; Bowling Green 41–27)
- (5:24) BGSU – Gehrig Dieter 14 yard pass from Matt Johnson (Tyler Tate kick) (Drive: 5 plays, 40 yards, 2:47; Bowling Green 48–27)

Statistics	Bowling Green	Maryland
First downs	35	16
Plays–yards	692	341
Rushes–yards	50-201-1	26–156-0
Passing yards	491	185
Passing: comp–att–int	36–55–1	16–33–3
Turnovers		
Time of possession	37:57	22:03

Team	Category	Player	Statistics
Bowling Green	Passing	Matt Johnson	36/55, 491 yards, 6 TDS, 1 INT
Bowling Green	Rushing	Fred Coppet	15 carries, 109 yards
Bowling Green	Receiving	Roger Lewis	15 receptions, 200 yards, 2 TDS
Maryland	Passing	Perry Hills	15/30, 168 yards, 2 TDS, 1 INT
Maryland	Rushing	Perry Hills	8 carries, 94 yards
Maryland	Receiving	Amba Etta-Tawo	5 receptions, 49 yards

The road win over a Power Five Conference opponent marks the first since a 8/30/08 win at Pittsburgh.

=== Memphis ===
Memphis Tigers (2-0) at Bowling Green Falcons (1-1) – Game summary

Quarter	1	2	3	4	Total
Memphis	10	7	17	10	44
Bowling Green	14	13	7	7	41

at Doyt Perry Stadium • Bowling Green, OH

- Date: September 19, 2015
- Game time: 3:00 p.m.
- Game weather: Temperature: 70 °F (21 °C) • Wind: NW 17 mph (27 km/h) • Weather: Cloudy
- Game attendance: 21,178
- Referee: Ed Ardito • Umpire: Jeffrey Akers • Linesman: Stephen Ray • Line judge: Charles Twiddy • Back judge: Gary Powers • Field judge: James Reif • Side judge: Alex Moore
- TV announcers (ASN): Dave Armstrong (play–by–play), Rich Baldinger (color)

Game information

First quarter

- (13:44) BGSU – Roger Lewis 62 yard pass from Matt Johnson (Tyler Tate kick) (Drive: 4 plays, 75 yards, 1:16; Bowling Green 7–0)
- (9:11) MEM – Doroland Dorceus 17 yard run (Jake Elliott kick) (Drive: 6 plays, 56 yards, 1:32; Tied 7–7)
- (5:47) BGSU – Donovan Wilson 2 yard run (Tyler Tate kick) (Drive: 10 plays, 75 yards, 3:24; Bowling Green 14–7)
- (1:50) MEM – Jake Elliott 34 yard field goal (Drive: 9 plays, 66 yards, 3:52; Bowling Green 14–10)

Second quarter

- (9:40) MEM – Daniel Montiel 6 yard pass from Paxton Lynch (Jake Elliott kick) (Drive: 14 plays, 88 yards, 5:57; Memphis 17–14)
- (2:11) BGSU – Matt Johnson 23 yard run (Tyler Tate kick) (Drive: 10 plays, 91 yards, 2:50; Bowling Green 21–17)
- (0:03) BGSU – Teo Redding 9 yard pass from Matt Johnson (Tyler Tate kick failed) (Drive: 9 plays, 90 yards, 1:25; Bowling Green 27–17)

Third quarter

- (11:44) MEM – Jake Elliott 52 yard field goal (Drive: 10 plays, 38 yards, 3:10; Bowling Green 27–20)
- (4:34) MEM – Sam Craft 3 yard run (Jake Elliott kick) (Drive: 10 plays, 70 yards, 4:09; Tied 27–27)
- (3:52) BGSU – Roger Lewis 94 yard pass from Matt Johnson (quarterback) (Tyler Tate kick) (Drive: 2 plays, 95 yards, :36; Bowling Green 34–27)
- (1:00) MEM – Sam Craft 60 yard pass from Paxton Lynch (Jake Elliott kick) (Drive: 6 plays, 78 yards, 2:46; Tied 34–34)

Fourth quarter

- (14:13) BGSU – Roger Lewis 62 yard pass from Matt Johnson (quarterback) (Tyler Tate kick) (Drive: 6 plays, 75 yards, 1:47; Bowling Green 41–34)
- (11:19) MEM – Tevin Jones 48 yard pass from Paxton Lynch (Jake Elliott kick) (Drive: 7 plays, 75 yards, 2:54; Tied 41–41)
- (7:35) MEM – Jake Elliott 29 yard field goal (Drive: 7 plays, 44 yards, 2:48; Memphis 44–41)

Statistics	Memphis	Bowling Green
First downs	28	24
Plays–yards	541	579
Rushes–yards	50-155-2	29–136-2
Passing yards	386	443
Passing: comp–att–int	29–40–0	28–45–0
Turnovers		
Time of possession	36:41	23:19

Team	Category	Player	Statistics
Memphis	Passing	Paxton Lynch	29/40, 386 yards, 3 TDS
Memphis	Rushing	Doroland Dorceus	16 carries, 75 yards, 1 TD
Memphis	Receiving	Tevin Jones	3 receptions, 98 yards, 1 TD
Bowling Green	Passing	Matt Johnson	28/44, 443 yards, 4 TDS
Bowling Green	Rushing	Travis Greene	11 carries, 63 yards
Bowling Green	Receiving	Roger Lewis	7 receptions, 261 yards, 3 TDS

=== At Purdue ===
Bowling Green Falcons (1-2) at Purdue Boilermakers (1-2) – Game summary

Quarter	1	2	3	4	Total
Bowling Green	7	14	0	14	35
Purdue	7	7	7	7	28

at Ross–Ade Stadium • West Lafayette, IN

- Date: September 26, 2015
- Game time: 12:00 p.m.
- Game weather: Temperature: 75 °F (24 °C) • Wind: Wind: ENE 10 mph (16 km/h) • Weather: Overcast
- Game attendance: 33,162
- Referee: Daneil Capron • Umpire: Pat Bayers • Linesman: Jim Ryan • Line judge: Brian Bolinger • Back judge: Jake Kemp • Field judge: Kyle DeBus • Side judge: Craig Jeffreys
- TV announcers (BTN): Chris Denari (play–by–play), Stanley Jackson (color)

Game information

First quarter

- (11:01) BGSU – Travis Greene 11 yard run (Tyler Tate kick) (Drive: 14 plays, 78 yards, 3:59; Bowling Green 7–0)
- (2:05) PUR – David Blough 1 yard run (Paul Griggs kick) (Drive: 13 plays, 40 yards, 6:03; Tied 7–7)

Second quarter

- (13:58) BGSU – Donovan Wilson 2 yard run (Tyler Tate kick) (Drive: 12 plays, 75 yards, 3:07; Bowling Green 14–7)
- (11:39) PUR – DeAngelo Yancey 45 yard pass from David Blough (Paul Griggs kick) (Drive: 5 plays, 75 yards, 2:19; Tied 14–14)
- (1:02) BGSU – Donovan Wilson 1 yard run (Tyler Tate kick) (Drive: 7 plays, 80 yards, 1:19; Bowling Green 21–14)

Third quarter

- (10:45) PUR – Jarrett Burgess 5 yard run (Paul Griggs kick) (Drive: 12 plays, 75 yards, 4:15; Tied 21–21)

Fourth quarter

- (8:34) BGSU – Ronnie Moore 4 yard pass from Matt Johnson (Tyler Tate kick) (Drive: 10 plays, 85 yards, 3:13; Bowling Green 28–21)
- (7:58) PUR – Gregory Phillips 62 yard pass from David Blough (Paul Griggs kick) (Drive: 2 plays, 75 yards, :36; Tied 28–28)
- (0:09) BGSU – Travis Greene 12 yard run (Tyler Tate kick) (Drive: 9 plays, 80 yards, 2:41; Bowling Green 35–28)

Statistics	Bowling Green	Purdue
First downs	39	25
Plays–yards	539	426
Rushes–yards	33-137-4	38–77-2
Passing yards	402	349
Passing: comp–att–int	43–59–1	30–40–1
Turnovers		
Time of possession	27:31	32:29

Team	Category	Player	Statistics
Bowling Green	Passing	Matt Johnson	43/59, 402 yards, 1 TD, 1 INT
Bowling Green	Rushing	Travis Greene	11 carries, 70 yards, 2 TDS
Bowling Green	Receiving	Gehrig Dieter	10 receptions, 96 yards
Purdue	Passing	David Blough	29/39, 340 yards, 2 TDS, 1 INT
Purdue	Rushing	D.J. Knox	19 carries, 42 yards
Purdue	Receiving	Gregory Phillips	4 receptions, 92 yards, 1 TD

The win marks the first time BGSU has defeated two Big Ten teams on the road in the same season. Advanced to 3-0 all-time against Purdue.

=== At Buffalo ===
Bowling Green Falcons (2-2) at Buffalo Bulls (2-2) – Game summary

Quarter	1	2	3	4	Total
Bowling Green	7	14	0	7	28
Buffalo	3	3	3	13	22

at UB Stadium • Amherst, NY

- Date: October 3, 2015
- Game time: 13:30 p.m.
- Game weather: Temperature: 47 °F (8 °C) • Wind: ENE22 mph (35 km/h) • Weather: Showers, Windy
- Game attendance: 20,843
- Referee: Curt Johnson • Umpire: David Parker • Linesman: Lance Ferrell • Line judge: Mike Maisner • Back judge: Rich Grube • Field judge: Kyle DeBuse • Side judge: Matt Kukar
- TV announcers (TWCS/BCSN/ESPN3): Mike Cairns (play–by–play), Frank Stams (color) Mike Cairns,& Ben Wagner (sideline)

Game information

First quarter

- (10:36) BGSU – Donovan Wilson 1 yard run (Tyler Tate kick) (Drive: 11 plays, 85 yards, 4:24; Bowling Green 7-0)
- (05:32) UB – Adam Mitcheson 30 yard field goal (Drive: 12 plays, 53 yards, 5:04; Bowling Green 7-3)

Second quarter

- (11:08) BGSU – Matt Johnson 10 yard run (Tyler Tate kick) (Drive: 3 plays, 72 yards, :42; Bowling Green 14-3)
- (07:54) BGSU – Roger Lewis 12 yard pass from Matt Johnson (Tyler Tate kick) (Drive: 6 plays, 72 yards, 1:05; Bowling Green 21-3)
- (00:22) UB – Adam Mitcheson 28 yard field goal (Drive: 15 plays, 79 yards, 2:00; Bowling Green 21-6)

Third quarter

- (02:41) UB – Adam Mitcheson 27 yard field goal (Drive: 16 plays, 78 yards, 5:35; Bowling Green 21-9)

Fourth quarter

- (14:54) BGSU – Ronnie Moore 7 yard run (Tyler Tate kick) (Drive: 10 plays, 94 yards, 2:42; Bowling Green 28-9)
- (08:42) UB – Jordan Johnson 1 yard run (Adam Mitcheson kick) (Drive: 16 plays, 92 yards, 6:05; Bowling Green 28-16)
- (05:13) UB – Ron Willoughby 5 yard pass from Joe Licata (Adam Mitcheson kick failed) (Drive: 7 plays, 62 yards, 1:16; Bowling Green 28-22)

Statistics	Bowling Green	Buffalo
First downs	25	34
Plays–yards	536	500
Rushes–yards	42-212-3	37–152-1
Passing yards	324	348
Passing: comp–att–int	23–29–0	35–59–1
Turnovers		
Time of possession	26:15	33:45

Team	Category	Player	Statistics
Bowling Green	Passing	Matt Johnson	23/29, 324 yards, 1 TDS
Bowling Green	Rushing	Travis Greene	17 carries, 119 yards
Bowling Green	Receiving	Roger Lewis	10 receptions, 201 yards, 1 TD
Buffalo	Passing	Joe Licata	35/59, 348 yards, 1 TD, 1 INT
Buffalo	Rushing	Anthone Taylor	21 carries, 93 yards
Buffalo	Receiving	Matt Weiser	8 receptions, 90 yards

The win marked Dino Babers' 30th career victory in just his 45th career game as head coach.

=== Massachusetts ===
UMass Minutemen (1-3) at Bowling Green Falcons (3-2) – Game summary

Quarter	1	2	3	4	Total
Massachusetts	10	7	14	7	38
Bowling Green	14	14	24	10	62

at Doyt Perry Stadium • Bowling Green, OH

- Date: October 10, 2015
- Game time: 2:00 p.m.
- Game weather: Temperature: 61 °F (16 °C) • Wind: SW 2 mph (3.2 km/h) • Weather: Sunny
- Game attendance: 17,118
- Referee: Mark Kluczynski • Umpire: Tony Smith • Linesman: Rudy Studd • Line judge: John Swartz • Back judge: T. Ripenhoff • Field judge: Kevin Sullivan • Side judge: Lewis Garrison
- TV announcers (ESPN3): Jim Barbar (play–by–play), John Gregory (color)

Game information

First quarter

- (11:11) BGSU – Derek Lee 2 yard pass from Matt Johnson (Tyler Tate kick) (Drive: 11 plays, 75 yards, 3:49; Bowling Green 7–0)
- (7:50) UMASS – Logan Laurent 22 yard field goal (Drive: 11 plays, 70 yards, 3:21; Bowling Green 7–3)
- (1:28) UMASS – Shakur Nesmith 15 yard pass from Blake Frohnapfel (Logan Laurent kick) (Drive: 11 plays, 82 yards, 4:29; UMass 10–7)
- (00:00) BGSU – Ronnie Moore 71 yard pass from Matt Johnson (Tyler Tate kick) (Drive: 5 plays, 91 yards, 1:21; Bowling Green 14–10)

Second quarter

- (10:09) BGSU – Travis Greene 32 yard run (Tyler Tate kick) (Drive: 5 plays, 78 yards, 1:38; Bowling Green 21–10)
- (4:34) BGSU – Donovan Wilson 1 yard run (Tyler Tate kick) (Drive: 9 plays, 67 yards, 3:42; Bowling Green 28–10)
- (2:57) UMASS – Tajae Sharpe 23 yard pass from Blake Frohnapfel (Logan Laurent kick) (Drive: 7 plays, 81 yards, 1:32; Bowling Green 28–17)

Third quarter

- (10:40) BGSU – Fred Coppet 10 yard run (Tyler Tate kick) (Drive: 8 plays, 45 yards, 2:49; Bowling Green 35–17)
- (9:33) BGSU – Ryan Burbrink 40 yard pass from Matt Johnson (Tyler Tate kick) (Drive: 3 plays, 30 yards, :59; Bowling Green 42–17)
- (9:18) UMASS – James Oliphant 97 yard kickoff return (Logan Laurent kick) (Bowling Green 42–24)
- (5:49) BGSU – Travis Greene 12 yard pass from Matt Johnson (Tyler Tate kick) (Drive: 8 plays, 75 yards, 3:29; Bowling Green 49–24)
- (3:57) UMASS – Marken Michel 21 yard pass from Blake Frohnapfel (Logan Laurent kick) (Drive: 6 plays, 75 yards, 1:52; Bowling Green 49–31)
- (0:00) BGSU – Tyler Tate 37 yard field goal (Drive: 10 plays, 46 yards, 3:57; Bowling Green 52–31)

Fourth quarter

- (12:02) BGSU – Roger Lewis 68 yard pass from Matt Johnson (quarterback) (Tyler Tate kick) (Drive: 3 plays, 78 yards, 1:39; Bowling Green 59–31)
- (5:51) BGSU – Tyler Tate 27 yard field goal (Drive: 9 plays, 60 yards, 5:14; Bowling Green 62–31)
- (2:15) UMASS – Dan Jonah 25 yard pass from Ross Comis (Drive: 3 plays, 70 yards, :39; Bowling Green 62–31)

Statistics	UMass	Bowling Green
First downs	30	37
Plays–yards	516	725
Rushes–yards	15-30-0	46–206-3
Passing yards	486	519
Passing: comp–att–int	37–61–1	37–45–1
Turnovers		
Time of possession	22:43	37:17

Team	Category	Player	Statistics
UMass	Passing	Blake Frohnapfel	34/56, 409 yards, 3 TDS, 1 INT
UMass	Rushing	Marquis Young	5 carries, 35 yards
UMass	Receiving	Tajae Sharpe	13 receptions, 156 yards, 1 TD
Bowling Green	Passing	Matt Johnson	33/39, 450 yards, 5 TDS, 1 INT
Bowling Green	Rushing	Travis Greene	15 carries, 122 yards, 1 TD
Bowling Green	Receiving	Roger Lewis	8 receptions, 242 yards, 1 TD

The Falcons had a school-record 725 yards of total offense, beating the previous school record of 706 set versus Grand Valley in 1978. BGSU ran 91 plays (46 rush, 45 pass).

=== Akron ===
Akron Zips (3-3) at Bowling Green Falcons (4-2) – Game summary

Quarter	1	2	3	4	Total
Akron	7	3	0	0	10
Bowling Green	7	21	21	10	59

at Doyt Perry Stadium • Bowling Green, OH

- Date: October 17, 2015
- Game time: 3:00 p.m.
- Game weather: Temperature: 45 °F (7 °C) • Wind: NW 9 mph (14 km/h) • Weather: Overcast
- Game attendance: 20,021
- Referee: Larry Smith • Umpire: Tim Gover • Linesman: Kole Knueppel • Line judge: Michael Sharp • Back judge: Jake Kemp • Field judge: Brad Horchem • Side judge: Edward Smith
- TV: ESPN3

Game information

First quarter

- (10:40) BGSU – Donovan Wilson 2 yard run (Tyler Tate kick) (Drive: 6 plays, 48 yards, 1:39; Bowling Green 7–0)
- (1:52) AKR – Tyrell Goodman 14 yard pass from Tommy Woodson (Robert Stein kick) (Drive: 10 plays, 52 yards, 3:46; Tied 7–7)

Second quarter

- (13:55) BGSU – Donovan Wilson 1 yard run (Tyler Tate kick) (Drive: 8 plays, 95 yards, 2:59; Bowling Green 14–7)
- (13:46) BGSU – Roger Lewis 12 yard pass from Matt Johnson (Tyler Tate kick) (Drive: 1 play, 12 yards, :04; Bowling Green 21–7)
- (10:19) AKR – Robert Stein 46 yard field goal (Drive: 9 plays, 45 yards, 3:24; Bowling Green 21–10)
- (4:20) BGSU – Gehrig Dieter 13 yard pass from Matt Johnson (Tyler Tate kick) (Drive: 7 plays, 89 yards, 1:57; Bowling Green 28–10)

Third quarter

- (11:31) BGSU – Ryan Burbrink 34 yard pass from Matt Johnson (Tyler Tate kick) (Drive: 8 plays, 65 yards, 3:23; Bowling Green 35–10)
- (5:04) BGSU – Fred Coppet 6 yard run (Tyler Tate kick) (Drive: 12 plays, 55 yards, 4:29; Bowling Green 42–10)
- (1:08) BGSU – Travis Greene 8 yard run (Tyler Tate kick) (Drive: 5 plays, 80 yards, 1:22; Bowling Green 49–10)

Fourth quarter

- (14:56) BGSU – Roger Lewis 1 yard pass from Matt Johnson (Tyler Tate kick) (Drive: 3 plays, 49 yards, :15; Bowling Green 56–10)
- (4:41) BGSU – Tyler Tate 28 yard field goal (Drive: 10 plays, 45 yards, 5:11; Bowling Green 59–10)

Statistics	Akron	Bowling Green
First downs	16	27
Plays–yards	271	532
Rushes–yards	42-167-0	42–120-3
Passing yards	104	412
Passing: comp–att–int	15–30–2	27–33–0
Turnovers		
Time of possession	32:02	27:58

Team	Category	Player	Statistics
Akron	Passing	Tommy Woodson	13/28, 91 yards, 1 TD, 2 INTS
Akron	Rushing	Conor Hundley	16 carries, 69 yards
Akron	Receiving	Jerome Lane	4 receptions, 45 yards
Bowling Green	Passing	Matt Johnson	25/30, 357 yards, 5 TDS
Bowling Green	Rushing	Travis Greene	13 carries, 64 yards
Bowling Green	Receiving	Roger Lewis	6 receptions, 118 yards, 2 TDS

Quarterback Matt Johnson threw his 50th-career touchdown pass with 4:20 remaining in the second quarter. The 49 point victory over Akron was the Falcons' largest margin of victory all-time in the series with the Zips.

=== At Kent State ===
Bowling Green Falcons (5-2) at Kent State Golden Flashes (3-4) – Game summary

Quarter	1	2	3	4	Total
Bowling Green	14	17	10	7	48
Kent State	0	0	0	0	0

at Dix Stadium • Kent, OH

- Date: October 24, 2015
- Game time: 1:00 p.m.
- Game weather: Temperature: 61 °F (16 °C) • Wind: S8 mph (13 km/h) • Weather: Overcast
- Game attendance: 14,739
- Referee: Greg Blum • Umpire: Brad Hudak • Linesman: BJ Henry • Line judge: Jeff Meslow • Back judge: Doug Warns • Field judge: Monte Tilgner • Side judge: Gaylon Williams
- TV: ESPN3

Game information

First quarter

- (09:40) BGSU – Matt Johnson 4 yard run (Tyler Tate kick) (Drive: 14 plays, 75 yards, 5:20; Bowling Green 7-0)
- (04:38) BGSU – Ronnie Moore 24 yard pass from Matt Johnson (Tyler Tate kick) (Drive: 9 plays, 75 yards, 3:40; Bowling Green 14-0)

Second quarter

- (14:35) BGSU – Ryan Burbrink 11 yard pass from Matt Johnson (Tyler Tate kick) (Drive: 10 plays, 85 yards, 2:56; Bowling Green 21-0)
- (08:45) BGSU – Tyler Tate 22 yard field goal (Drive: 10 plays, 51 yards, 3:09; Bowling Green 24-0)
- (04:21) BGSU – Ronnie Moore 58 yard pass from Matt Johnson (Tyler Tate kick) (Drive: 6 plays, 78 yards, 1:55; Bowling Green 31-0)

Third quarter

- (08:07) BGSU – Tyler Tate 25 yard field goal (Drive: 5 plays, 19 yards, 1:23; Bowling Green 34-0)
- (02:01) BGSU – Roger Lewis 64 yard pass from Matt Johnson (Tyler Tate kick) (Drive: 2 plays, 77 yards, :31; Bowling Green 41-0)

Fourth quarter

- (08:55) BGSU – Roger Lewis 15 yard pass from Matt Johnson (Tyler Tate kick) (Drive: 9 plays, 57 yards, 3:20; Bowling Green 48-0)

Statistics	Bowling Green	Kent State
First downs	31	10
Plays–yards	602	166
Rushes–yards	46-153-1	26–55-0
Passing yards	449	111
Passing: comp–att–int	29–45–0	12–25–2
Turnovers		
Time of possession	33:47	26:13

Team	Category	Player	Statistics
Bowling Green	Passing	Matt Johnson	27/40, 430 yards, 5 TDS
Bowling Green	Rushing	Travis Greene	18 carries, 53 yards
Bowling Green	Receiving	Roger Lewis	4 receptions, 102 yards, 1 TDS
Kent State	Passing	George Bollas	12/25, 111 yards, 2 INTS
Kent State	Rushing	P.J. Simmons	4 carries, 48 yards
Kent State	Receiving	Antwan Dixon	3 receptions, 52 yards

The Falcons outgained the Golden Flashes, 602-166, and held Kent State to just 55 rushing yards on 26 attempts. Defensive back Jamari Bozeman led BG with eight tackles. The 48-point margin of victory was the Falcons' largest all-time against Kent State. This was the first shutout against Kent State since a 44-0 win in 1970.

=== Ohio ===
Ohio Bobcats (5-3) at Bowling Green Falcons (6-2) – Game summary

Quarter	1	2	3	4	Total
Ohio	7	7	3	7	24
Bowling Green	14	13	21	14	62

at Doyt Perry Stadium • Bowling Green, OH

- Date: Wednesday, November 4, 2015
- Game time: 8:00 p.m.
- Game weather: Temperature: 63 °F (17 °C) • Wind: S 4 mph (6.4 km/h) • Weather: Clear skies
- Game attendance: 16,233
- Referee: Curt Johnson • Umpire: Bob Holcomb • Linesman: Daniel Richard • Line judge: Vincent Winters • Back judge: Jeff Latkiewicz • Field judge: John Masterson • Side judge: Ryan Flynn
- TV announcers (ESPN2): Dave LaMont (play–by–play), Desmond Howard (color), Quint Kessenich (sideline)

Game information

First quarter

- (07:24) BGSU – Travis Greene 11 yard run (Tyler Tate kick) (Drive: 6 plays, 69 yards, 1:39; Bowling Green 7–0)
- (3:20) OHIO – A.J. Ouellette 7 yard run (Josiah Yazdani kick) (Drive: 9 plays, 70 yards, 3:56; Tied 7–7)
- (00:01) BGSU – Travis Greene 10 yard run (Tyler Tate kick) (Drive: 12 plays, 75 yards, 3:19; Bowling Green 14–7)

Second quarter

- (10:03) OHIO – Daz'mond Patterson 4 yard run (Josiah Yazdani kick) (Drive: 11 plays, 78 yards, 4:57; Tied 14–14)
- (08:20) BGSU – Ronnie Moore 48 yard pass from Matt Johnson (Tyler Tate kick failed) (Drive: 5 plays, 63 yards, 1:37; Bowling Green 20–14)
- (04:47) BGSU – Gehrig Dieter 10 yard pass from Matt Johnson (Tyler Tate kick) (Drive: 4 plays, 43 yards, 1:23; Bowling Green 27–14)

Third quarter

- (11:38) BGSU – Gehrig Dieter 75 yard pass from Matt Johnson (Tyler Tate kick) (Drive: 3 plays, 86 yards, 1:08; Bowling Green 34–14)
- (08:51) BGSU – Dernard Turner 85 yard interception return (Tyler Tate kick) (Bowling Green 41–14)
- (04:12) OHIO – Josiah Yazdani 25 yard field goal (Drive: 16 plays, 67 yards, 4:39;(Bowling Green 41–17)
- (01:16) BGSU – Roger Lewis 19 yard pass from Matt Johnson (Tyler Tate kick) (Drive: 9 plays, 73 yards, 2:21; Bowling Green 48–17)

Fourth quarter

- (08:38) BGSU – Travis Greene 43 yard run (Tyler Tate kick) (Drive: 7 plays, 91 yards, 2:42; Bowling Green 55–17)
- (06:53) OHIO – Maleek Irons 44 yard run (Josiah Yazdani kick) (Drive: 6 plays, 80 yards, 1:40; Bowling Green 55–24)
- (03:26) BGSU – Teo Redding 7 yard pass from James Knapke (Tyler Tate kick) (Drive: 9 plays, 72 yards, 3:19; Bowling Green 62–24)

Statistics	Ohio	Bowling Green
First downs	34	29
Plays–yards	543	581
Rushes–yards	56-299-3	30–182-3
Passing yards	244	399
Passing: comp–att–int	21–41–2	29–39–0
Turnovers		
Time of possession	37:06	22:54

Team	Category	Player	Statistics
Ohio	Passing	J.D. Sprague	10/24, 162 yards, 2 INT
Ohio	Rushing	Maleek Irons	4 carries, 58 yards, 1 TD
Ohio	Receiving	Sebastian Smith	10 receptions, 84 yards
Bowling Green	Passing	Matt Johnson	26/35, 365 yards, 4 TDS
Bowling Green	Rushing	Travis Greene	13 carries, 106 yards, 3 TDS
Bowling Green	Receiving	Gehrig Dieter	9 receptions, 136 yards, 2 TDS

The win over Ohio marked the Falcons 17th straight victory over opponents from the MAC East. For the third straight season, BG finished undefeated against the East Division, going 5-0 in 2015. Roger Lewis had 102 receiving yards, making the fifth straight game he has gone over 100 yards on the season. Bowling Green went over 500 yards of total offense for the ninth time this season.

=== At Western Michigan ===
Bowling Green Falcons (7-2) at Western Michigan Broncos (6-3) – Game summary

Quarter	1	2	3	4	Total
Bowling Green	14	13	14	0	41
Western Michigan	10	10	7	0	27

at Waldo Stadium • Kalamazoo, MI

- Date: Wednesday, November 11, 2015
- Game time: 8:00 p.m.
- Game weather: Temperature: 53 °F (12 °C) • Wind: Wind: SSE 18 mph (29 km/h) • Weather: Clear, pot. rain
- Game attendance: 14,436
- Referee: Gus Sujack • Umpire: John Hanneke • Linesman: Paul Beyerle • Line judge: Jon Shelton • Back judge: Reggie Berry • Field judge: Phil Hicks • Side judge: Arthur Lucky
- TV announcers (ESPN2): Dave LaMont (play–by–play), Desmond Howard (color), Paul Carcaterra (sideline)

Game information

First quarter

- (13:13) BGSU – Roger Lewis 35 yard pass from Matt Johnson (Tyler Tate kick) (Drive: 10 plays, 79 yards, 1:47; Bowling Green 7-0)
- (09:29) WMU – Andrew Haldeman 48 yard field goal (Drive: 8 plays, 47 yards, 3:44; Bowling Green 7-3)
- (07:24) BGSU – Travis Greene 24 yard run (Tyler Tate kick) (Drive: 9 plays, 77 yards, 2:05; Bowling Green 14-3)
- (02:55) WMU – Jamauri Bogan 3 yard run (Andrew Haldeman kick) (Drive: 11 plays, 78 yards, 4:29; Bowling Green 14-10)

Second quarter

- (13:45) WMU – Jamauri Bogan 3 yard run (Andrew Haldeman kick) (Drive: 7 plays, 83 yards, 2:41; Western Michigan 17-14)
- (09:41) BGSU – Teo Redding 42 yard pass from Matt Johnson (Tyler Tate kick) (Drive: 8 plays, 80 yards, 1:48; Bowling Green 21-17)
- (04:38) BGSU – Roger Lewis 31 yard pass from Matt Johnson (Tyler Tate kick failed) (Drive: 5 plays, 45 yards, 1:02; Bowling Green 27-17)
- (00:00) WMU – Andrew Haldeman 21 yard field goal (Drive: 5 plays, 10 yards, :35; Bowling Green 27-20)

Third quarter

- (10:39) WMU – Zach Terrell 10 yard run (Andrew Haldeman kick) (Drive: 8 plays, 58 yards, 4:11; Tied 27-27)
- (08:43) BGSU – Travis Greene 26 yard run (Tyler Tate kick) (Drive: 8 plays, 77 yards, 2:06; Bowling Green 34-27)
- (02:54) BGSU – Travis Greene 5 yard run (Tyler Tate kick) (Drive: 11 plays, 64 yards, 3:48; Bowling Green 41-27)

Statistics	Bowling Green	Western Michigan
First downs	28	27
Plays–yards	505	487
Rushes–yards	41-236-3	45–205-3
Passing yards	269	282
Passing: comp–att–int	23–41–1	24–40–1
Turnovers		
Time of possession	24:23	35:37

Team	Category	Player	Statistics
Bowling Green	Passing	Matt Johnson	23/31, 269 yards, 3 TDS, 1 INT
Bowling Green	Rushing	Travis Greene	24 carries, 170 yards, 3 TDS
Bowling Green	Receiving	Roger Lewis	5 receptions, 86 yards
Western Michigan	Passing	Zach Terrell	24/40, 282 yards, 1 INT
Western Michigan	Rushing	Jamauri Bogan	22 carries, 118 yards, 1 TDS
Western Michigan	Receiving	Corey Davis	13 receptions, 159 yards

P. J. Fleck's Broncos entered the game on a five game winning streak, all coming against MAC opponents. The Falcons became the first team to win three straight MAC East titles since Marshall won six consecutive East Division championships from 1997-2002. BG improved to 6-0 in MAC play for the first time since 1994. First victory over WMU since 52-0 win in 2004.

=== Toledo ===
Toledo Rockets (8-1) at Bowling Green Falcons (8-2) – Game summary

Quarter	1	2	3	4	Total
Toledo	17	13	7	7	44
Bowling Green	0	14	14	0	28

at Doyt Perry Stadium • Bowling Green, OH

- Date: Tuesday, November 17, 2015
- Game time: 6:00 p.m.
- Game weather: Temperature: 59 °F (15 °C) • Wind: SE 12 mph (19 km/h) • Weather: Cloudy
- Game attendance: 23,492
- Referee: Larry Smith • Umpire: Tim Gover • Linesman: Kole Knueppel • Line judge: Michael Sharp • Back judge: Jake Kemp • Field judge: Brad Horchem • Side judge: Edward Smith • Center judge: Jason Grant
- TV announcers (ESPN2): Mark Neely (play–by–play), Ray Bentley (color), Quint Kessenich (sideline)

Game information

First quarter

- (12:55) TOLEDO – Kareem Hunt 5 yard run (Jameson Vest kick) (Drive: 4 plays, 27 yards, 1:52; Toledo 7–0)
- (10:02) TOLEDO – Terry Swanson 23 yard run (Jameson Vest kick) (Drive: 3 plays, 67 yards, :50; Toledo 14–0)
- (03:10) TOLEDO – Jemeson Vest 20 yard field goal (Drive: 11 plays, 60 yards, 5:29; Toledo 17–0)

Second quarter

- (14:14) TOLEDO – Jemeson Vest 22 yard field goal (Drive: 6 plays, 49 yards, 1:47; Toledo 20–0)
- (12:20) BGSU – Fred Coppet 5 yard run (Tyler Tate kick) (Drive: 9 plays, 65 yards, 1:47; Toledo 20–7)
- (08:33) TOLEDO – Jemeson Vest 35 yard field goal (Drive: 10 plays, 47 yards, 3:47; Toledo 23–7)
- (05:58) TOLEDO – Kareem Hunt 11 yard run (Jameson Vest kick) (Drive: 10 plays, 47 yards, 3:47; Toledo 30–7)
- (01:34) BGSU – Gehrig Dieter 5 yard pass from Matt Johnson (Tyler Tate kick) (Drive: 11 plays, 76 yards, 4:17; Toledo 30–14)

Third quarter

- (12:25) BGSU – Gehrig Dieter 3 yard pass from Matt Johnson (Tyler Tate kick) (Drive: 4 plays, 32 yards, 1:19; Toledo 30–21)
- (11:10) TOLEDO – Phillip Ely 8 yard run (Jameson Vest kick) (Drive: 2 plays, 8 yards, :35; Toledo 37–21)
- (08:03) BGSU – Gehrig Dieter 11 yard pass from Matt Johnson (Tyler Tate kick) (Drive: 10 plays, 57 yards, 3:01; Toledo 37–28)

Fourth quarter

- (08:38) TOLEDO – Alonzo Russell 15 yard pass from Phillip Ely (Jameson Vest kick) (Drive: 9 plays, 64 yards, 5:14; Toledo 44–28)

Statistics	Toledo	Bowling Green
First downs	20	28
Plays–yards	406	368
Rushes–yards	50-198-4	30–94-1
Passing yards	208	274
Passing: comp–att–int	16–24–1	28–46–2
Turnovers		
Time of possession	34:31	25:29

Team	Category	Player	Statistics
Toledo	Passing	Phillip Ely	16/24, 208 yards, 1 TD, 1 INT
Toledo	Rushing	Kareem Hunt	29 carries, 153 yards, 2 TDS
Toledo	Receiving	Alonzo Russell	3 receptions, 74 yards, 1 TD
Bowling Green	Passing	Matt Johnson	28/46, 274 yards, 3 TDS, 2 INTS
Bowling Green	Rushing	Travis Greene	17 carries, 73 yards
Bowling Green	Receiving	Gehrig Dieter	13 receptions, 103 yards, 3 TDS

Toledo's defense held BG to 368 yards of total offense, 216 below its average of 584. The Rockets defense caused five turnovers, including three fumble recoveries and two interceptions. Travis Greene became BGSU's all-time leading rusher. He finished the game with 73 rushing yards and had a new career total of 3,492, passing former running back Dave Preston. Quarterback Matt Johnson set a school record for the most passing yards in a single-season, passing Tyler Sheehan's 2009 mark of 4,051. Linebacker Austin Valdez led the Flacons with 13 total tackles and 2.5 TFLs. He also added his second career interception.

=== At Ball State ===
Bowling Green Falcons (8-3) at Ball State Cardinals (3-8) – Game summary

Quarter	1	2	3	4	Total
Bowling Green	13	14	7	14	48
Ball State	0	0	7	3	10

at Scheumann Stadium • Muncie, IN

- Date: Tuesday, November 24, 2015
- Game time: 7:00 p.m.
- Game weather: Temperature: 45 °F (7 °C) • Wind: SE 4 mph (6.4 km/h) • Weather: Clear
- Game attendance: 5,201
- Referee: Ron Hudson • Umpire: David Parker • Linesman: Lance Ferrell • Line judge: Michael Maisner • Back judge: Rich Grub • Field judge: Kyle DeBuse • Side judge: Matt Kukar
- TV announcers (ESPN3): Jim Barbar (play–by–play), Mark Herrmann (color)

Game information

First quarter

- (06:45) BGSU – Hunter Folkertsma 3 yard pass from Matt Johnson (Tyler Tate kick failed) (Drive: 9 plays, 49 yards, 2:40; Bowling Green 6–0)
- (01:37) BGSU – Fred Coppet 1 yard run (Tyler Tate kick) (Drive: 11 plays, 98 yards, 2:55; Bowling Green 13–0)

Second quarter

- (09:39) BGSU – Travis Greene 4 yard run (Tyler Tate kick) (Drive: 6 plays, 73 yards, 1:36; Bowling Green 20–0)
- (00:36) BGSU – Matt Johnson 4 yard run (Tyler Tate kick) (Drive: 5 plays, 27 yards, :41; Bowling Green 27–0)

Third quarter

- (11:11) BGSU – Gehrig Dieter 1 yard pass from Matt Johnson (Tyler Tate kick) (Drive: 4 plays, 71 yards, 1:16; Bowling Green 34–0)
- (04:09) BALL – Chris Shillings 7 yard pass from Riley Neal (Morgan Hagee kick) (Drive: 12 plays, 69 yards, 3:52; Bowling Green 34–7)

Fourth quarter

- (09:25) BALL – Morgan Hagee 32 yard field goal (Drive: 13 plays, 46 yards, 6:25; Bowling Green 34–10)
- (06:16) BGSU – Travis Greene 8 yard run (Tyler Tate kick) (Drive: 9 plays, 90 yards, 3:04; Bowling Green 41–10)
- (00:39) BGSU – Matt Domer 95 yard run (Tyler Tate kick) (Drive: 1 plays, 95 yards, :13; Bowling Green 48–10)

Statistics	Bowling Green	Ball State
First downs	22	15
Plays–yards	576	264
Rushes–yards	37-337-5	38–110-0
Passing yards	239	154
Passing: comp–att–int	26–45–0	24–40–3
Turnovers		
Time of possession	22:26	37:34

Team	Category	Player	Statistics
Bowling Green	Passing	Matt Johnson	24/31, 236 yards, 2 TDS
Bowling Green	Rushing	Fred Coppet	12 carries, 109 yards, 1 TD
Bowling Green	Receiving	Gehrig Dieter	11 receptions, 81 yards, 1 TDS
Ball State	Passing	Riley Neal	24/40, 154 yards, 1 TD, 3 INTS
Ball State	Rushing	James Gilbert	16 carries, 66 yards
Ball State	Receiving	KeVonn Mabon	7 receptions, 54 yards

Quarterback Matt Johnson tied the school and MAC record for touchdown passes in a single season. Johnson's 41st touchdown tied fellow Falcon Omar Jacobs' mark that was set in 2004. Running back Matt Domer's 95-yard touchdown was the second-longest touchdown run in school history. Travis Greene went over 1,000 rushing yards for the season, becoming the second player in school history, joining Paul Miles, to rush for 1,000 yards in multiple seasons. Defensively, the Falcons had three first-half interceptions. Alfonso Mack had his team-leading fifth interception, while Dernard Turner had his fourth of the season and Eilar Hardy registered his second. Linebacker Brandon Harris had a career-high 11 tackles. BGSU finished the regular season at 9-3 overall and 7-1 in the Mid-American Conference.

=== Northern Illinois–MAC Championship Game ===
2015 MAC Championship Game
Bowling Green Falcons (9–3, 7–1) vs. Northern Illinois Huskies (8–4, 6–2)

Quarter	1	2	3	4	Total
Bowling Green	7	14	7	6	34
Northern Illinois	0	0	14	0	14

at Ford Field • Detroit, MI

- Date: Friday, December 4, 2015
- Game time: 8:00 p.m. EST
- Game weather: N/A (game played indoors)
- Game attendance: 16,425
- Referee: M. Kluczynski • Umpire: Bob Holcomb • Linesman: Kole Knueppel • Line judge: Mark Bennett • Back judge: Doug Warns • Field judge: D. Pender • Side judge: Rich Ames
- TV announcers (ESPN2/IMG College): Dave Flemming, Mack Brown, Allison Williams (ESPN2)
  David Shumate, Jon Jansen (IMG College)

Game information

First Quarter

- (04:15) BGSU – Fred Coppet 4 yard run (Tyler Tate kick) (Drive: 10 plays, 70 yards, 2:40; Bowling Green 7–0)

Second quarter

- (05:28) BGSU – Derek Lee 2 yard pass from Matt Johnson (Tyler Tate kick) (Drive: 3 plays, 17 yards, :56; Bowling Green 14–0)
- (01:04) BGSU – Travis Greene 25 yard run (Tyler Tate kick) (Drive: 8 plays, 84 yards, 2:32; Bowling Green 21–0)

Third quarter

- (12:26) BGSU – Roger Lewis 45 yard pass from Matt Johnson (Tyler Tate kick) (Drive: 5 plays, 73 yards, 1:37; Bowling Green 28–0)
- (05:43) NIU – Desroy Maxwell 32 yard pass from Tommy Fiedler (Christian Hagan kick) (Drive: 5 plays, 46 yards, 1:29; Bowling Green 28–7)
- (02:24) NIU – Shawun Lurry 64 yard interception return (Christian Hagan kick) (Bowling Green 28–14)

Fourth quarter

- (12:32) BGSU – Travis Greene 1 yard run (Tyler Tate kick blocked) (Drive: 12 plays, 83 yards, 4:47; Bowling Green 34–14)

Statistics	Bowling Green	Northern Illinois
First downs	25	17
Plays–yards	501	259
Rushes–yards	53-266-3	38–107-0
Passing yards	235	152
Passing: comp–att–int	25–37–2	12–28–3
Turnovers		
Time of possession	34:26	25:34

Team	Category	Player	Statistics
Bowling Green	Passing	Matt Johnson	25/37, 235 yards, 2 TDS, 2 INTS
Bowling Green	Rushing	Travis Greene	29 carries, 183 yards, 2 TDS
Bowling Green	Receiving	Gehrig Dieter	7 receptions, 75 yards
Northern Illinois	Passing	Tommy Fiedler	12/28, 152 yards, 1 TD, 3 INTS
Northern Illinois	Rushing	Joel Bouagnon	14 carries, 57 yards
Northern Illinois	Receiving	Desroy Maxwell	3 receptions, 68 yards, 1 TD

The 2015 conference title was the second MAC Championship over the last three years for the Falcons and is the 12th MAC Championship in school history. Redshirt-senior Travis Greene ran for a career-high 183 yards and two touchdowns, earning him the Most Valuable Player award. Quarterback Matt Johnson threw for 235 yards and two touchdowns. Wide receiver Gehrig Dieter caught a game high seven receptions for 75 yards, while Roger Lewis totaled six catches for 75 yards, including a 45-yard touchdown catch and run in the third quarter. Defensively, BG was led by linebacker Austin Valdez's 13 total tackles, while defensive back Alfonso Mack finished with seven total stops and an interception. The defense forced three interceptions and two fumble recoveries.

On December 5, Dino Babers became the head coach at Syracuse.

=== Georgia Southern–GoDaddy Bowl ===
2015 GoDaddy Bowl
Georgia Southern Eagles (8-4, 6-2) vs Bowling Green Falcons (10-3, 7-1)

Quarter	1	2	3	4	Total
Georgia Southern	9	14	21	14	58
Bowling Green	13	14	0	0	27

at Ladd–Peebles Stadium • Mobile, AL

- Date: Wednesday, December 23, 2015
- Game time: 7:00 p.m.
- Game weather: Temperature: 72 °F (22 °C) • Wind: S 19 mph (31 km/h) • Weather: Cloudy
- Game attendance: 28,656
- Referee: Scott Campbell • Umpire: M Henderson • Linesman: Greg Downum • Line judge: Steve Hoslett • Back judge: Robert Lewis • Field judge: Kirk Wisneski • Side judge: Rick Ockey
- TV announcers (ESPN): Tom Hart (play-by-play), Andre Ware (analyst), and Laura Rutledge (sideline) (ESPN)

Game information

First quarter

- (08:52) GASO – La Ramsby 1 yard run (Younghoe Koo kick) (Drive: 9 plays, 75 yards, 4:34; Georgia Southern 7–0)
- (07:29) BGSU – Roger Lewis 45 yard pass from Matt Johnson (Tyler Tate kick blocked) (Drive: 6 plays, 75 yards, 1:23; Georgia Southern 7–6)
- (07:29) GASO – Matt Dobson 99 yard defensive 2-point conversion return(Georgia Southern 9–6)
- (00:33) BGSU – Ronnine Moore 15 yard pass from Matt Johnson (Tyler Tate kick)(Drive: 7 plays, 75 yards, 1:42; Bowling Green 13–9)

Second quarter

- (11:42) BGSU – Gehrig Dieter 51 yard pass from Matt Johnson (Tyler Tate kick) (Drive: 1 play, 51 yards, :08; Bowling Green 20–9)
- (07:53) GASO – Wesley Fields 26 yard run (Younghoe Koo kick) (Drive: 7 plays, 75 yards, 3:49; Bowling Green 20–16)
- (01:27) GASO – Montay Crockett 31 yard pass from Kevin Ellison (Younghoe Koo kick) (Drive: 12 plays, 92 yards, 5:15; Georgia Southern 23–20)
- (00:36) BGSU – Travis Greene 5 yard run (Tyler Tate kick) (Drive: 5 plays, 66 yards, :51; Bowling Green 27–23)

Third quarter

- (07:26) GASO – Favian Upshaw 3 yard run (Younghoe Koo kick) (Drive: 14 plays, 75 yards, 7:31; Georgia Southern 30–27)
- (02:55) GASO – Favian Upshaw 80 yard run (Younghoe Koo kick) (Drive: 1 play, 80 yards, :11; Georgia Southern 37–27)
- (01:51) GASO – Matt Breida 1 yard run (Younghoe Koo kick) (Drive: 2 plays, 14 yards, :23; Georgia Southern 44–27)

Fourth quarter

- (14:55) GASO – Favian Upshaw 8 yard run (Younghoe Koo kick) (Drive: 2 plays, 10 yards, :48; Georgia Southern 51–27)
- (05:25) GASO – Favian Upshaw 3 yard run (Younghoe Koo kick) (Drive: 6 plays, 80 yards, 3:59; Georgia Southern 58–27)

Statistics	Georgia Southern	Bowling Green
First downs	26	15
Plays–yards	534	362
Rushes–yards	68-452-7	29–116-1
Passing yards	82	246
Passing: comp–att–int	4–8–0	15–34–0
Turnovers		
Time of possession	40:39	19:21

Team	Category	Player	Statistics
Georgia Southern	Passing	Kevin Ellison	3/5, 65 yards, 1 TD
Georgia Southern	Rushing	Favian Upshaw	12 carries, 199 yards, 4 TDS
Georgia Southern	Receiving	Montay Crockett	1 reception, 31 yards, 1 TD
Bowling Green	Passing	Matt Johnson	15/34, 246 yards, 3 TDS
Bowling Green	Rushing	Travis Greene	10 carries, 79 yards, 1 TD
Bowling Green	Receiving	Ronnie Moore	5 receptions, 83 yards, 1 TD

Georgia Southern scored 35 unanswered points in the second half to overcome Bowling Green's 27-23 halftime lead. Quarterback Matt Johnson threw three first half touchdowns. He became BG's passing touchdown leader, passing Omar Jacobs's 70-touchdown mark with 73 to end his career. Johnson extended his MAC and school records for most passing yards (4,946) and touchdown passes (46) in a single season. With his 15 completions, Johnson finished the year with 383, breaking the school record set by Tyler Sheehan (373) in 2009. Running back Travis Greene finished his career with 3,852 rushing yards, most in program history. Wide receiver Roger Lewis (1,544) and Gehrig Dieter (1,033), combined for the most yards for any wide receiver duo in school history. Punter Joe Davidson's 73-yard punt became the longest punt in GoDaddy Bowl history and BGSU's bowl history. Defensively, Taylor Royster and Austin Valdez each recorded 11 tackles. Bowling Green ended the season with a record of 10-4, winning double-digit games for the sixth time in program history. Bowling Green became 6-7 all-time in bowl games and 1-2 all-time in the GoDaddy Bowl. On the season, the Falcons scored a school record 591 points and 81 touchdowns.

== Awards and honors ==
=== Weekly awards ===
Award	Player	Position	Year	Date	Source
MAC East Offensive Player of the Week	Matt Johnson	QB	R-Sr.	Sep. 7	
MAC East Offensive Player of the Week	Matt Johnson (2)	QB	R-Sr.	Sep. 14	
MAC East Special Teams Player of the Week	Joseph Davidson	P	R-So.	Sep. 14	
MAC East Offensive Player of the Week	Roger Lewis	WR	So.	Sep. 21	
MAC East Offensive Player of the Week	Matt Johnson (3)	QB	R-Sr.	Sep. 28	
MAC East Offensive Player of the Week	Roger Lewis (2)	Wr	So.	Oct. 5	
MAC East Offensive Player of the Week	Matt Johnson (4)	QB	R-Sr.	Oct. 12	
MAC East Special Teams Player of the Week	Tyler Tate	K	R-Sr.	Oct. 12	
MAC East Offensive Player of the Week	Matt Johnson (5)	QB	R-Sr.	Oct. 19	
MAC East Offensive Player of the Week	Matt Johnson (6)	QB	R-Sr.	Oct. 26	
MAC East Special Teams Player of the Week	Joseph Davidson (2)	P	R-So.	Oct. 26	
MAC East Offensive Player of the Week	Travis Greene	RB	R-Sr.	Nov. 9	
MAC East Offensive Player of the Week	Travis Greene (2)	RB	R-Sr.	Nov. 16	
MAC East Defensive Player of the Week	Brandon Harris	LB	Fr.	Nov. 30	

=== MAC Conference Individual Yearly awards ===
Award	Player	Position	Year	Date	Source
MAC Offensive Player of the Year	Matt Johnson	QB	R-Sr.	Dec. 2	
Vern Smith Leadership Award Winner	Matt Johnson	QB	R-Sr.	Dec. 2	

=== All-MAC awards ===
Award	Player	Position	Year
All-MAC First Team Offense	Matt Johnson	QB	R-Sr.
All-MAC First Team Offense	Roger Lewis	WR	So.
All-MAC First Team Offense	Travis Greene	RB	R-Sr.
All-MAC First Team Defense	Austin Valdez	ILB	R-So.
All-MAC First Team Defense	Joseph Davidson	P	R-So.
All-MAC Second Team Offense	Alex Huettel	OL	R-Sr.
All-MAC Second Team Offense	Jacob Bennett	OL	R-Jr.
All-MAC Second Team Offense	Gehrig Dieter	WR	R-Jr.
All-MAC Second Team Defense	Trenton Greene	OLB	R-Jr.
All-MAC Third Team Offense	Ronnie Moore	WR	Jr.
All-MAC Third Team Specialists	Ryan Burbrink	PR	R-Sr.

=== Annual Awards ===
Award	Player	Position	Date
Sammy Baugh Top Passer Award	Matt Johnson	QB	Dec. 2
Paul Warfield Award	Roger Lewis	WR	Dec. 2

=== All-Americans ===
NCAA Recognized All-American Honors
Player	Position	AFCA	AP	FWAA	Sporting News	WCFF	Designation
Roger Lewis	WR		3rd Team	2nd Team			

Other All-American Honors
Player	Position	Athletic	Athlon	Bleacher Report	CBS Sports	CFN	ESPN	FOX Sports	Phil Steele	Scout	SI	USA Today
Alex Huettel	OL								1st Team			
Matt Johnson	QB								4th Team		HM	
Roger Lewis	WR								2nd Team		HM	

=== Midseason Awards & watch lists ===
Award	Player	Position	Date
Manning Award Stars of the Week	Matt Johnson	QB	Sep. 14
Davey O' Brien Quarterback of the Week	Matt Johnson	QB	Sep. 15
Maxwell Award National Player of the Week	Matt Johnson	QB	Sep 17
CFPA National Player of the Week	Matt Johnson	QB	Sep. 17
Biletnikoff watchlist	Ryan Burbrink, Roger Lewis and Ronnie Moore	WR	Oct. 28
Ray Guy Award	Joseph Davidson	P	Oct. 30
Davey O' Brien Semifinalist	Matt Johnson	QB	Nov. 2
Biletnikoff Semifinalist	Roger Lewis	WR	Nov. 17
Broyles Award	Sean Lewis	OC	Nov. 25
