= Matt Johnson (quarterback) =

American football player and coach (born 1992)

San Diego State Aztecs
- Title: Offensive Coordinator and Quarterbacks coach

Personal information
- Born: September 9, 1992 (age 34); Harrisburg, Pennsylvania, U.S.
- Listed height: 6 ft 0 in (1.83 m)
- Listed weight: 209 lb (95 kg)

Career information
- Position: Quarterback
- High school: Bishop McDevitt (PA)
- College: Bowling Green
- NFL draft: 2016: undrafted

Career history

Playing
- Cincinnati Bengals (2016)*; Hamilton Tiger-Cats (2017)*
- * Offseason or practice squad member only

Coaching
- Bishop McDevitt (PA) (2016) Quarterbacks coach; Syracuse (2017) Offensive quality control; Kent State (2018-2019) Offensive quality control; Kent State (2020–2022) Running backs coach; Kent State (2023) Offensive coordinator/Quarterbacks coach; San Diego State (2024) Quarterbacks coach; San Diego State (2025-present) Offensive coordinator/Quarterbacks coach

Awards and highlights
- MAC Most Valuable Player (2015); MAC Offensive Player of the Year (2015); Sammy Baugh Trophy (2015); First team All-MAC (2015)
- Stats at CFL.ca

Matthew Quinn Johnson (born September 9, 1992) is an American football coach and former quarterback, who is currently the offensive coordinator and quarterbacks coach for San Diego State. He played college football for the Bowling Green Falcons.

== Early life ==
Johnson attended Harrisburg (PA) Bishop McDevitt in Harrisburg, Pennsylvania. As a senior, he passed for 2,975 yards with 26 touchdown passes. Throughout his high school career Johnson was rated as a three-star recruit and was offered by Temple, Miami (OH) and Bowling Green. On July 9, 2010, Johnson committed to Bowling Green. He was recruited by Warren Ruggiero. Johnson went 39-5 as Bishop McDevitt's starting quarterback. He still ranks among PIAA football records for all-time passing yards (7,994) and touchdown passes (85).

== College career ==
=== Freshman season ===
As a redshirt freshman for the Bowling Green Falcons in 2012, he was a backup quarterback behind Matt Schilz. He appeared in eight games and made his collegiate debut on September 1 against Florida. He threw his first collegiate touchdown against Rhode Island on September 29.

=== Sophomore season ===
In 2013, Johnson competed to open the season as the starting quarterback. Shilz started the first game, but Johnson was inserted into the game for the beginning of the third drive in the season-opener against Tulsa, leading the Falcons to victory. Johnson defeated Kent State in his first collegiate start the following week. Johnson completed 19 of 25 passes for 357 yards and two touchdowns. In the MAC Championship Game against undefeated and nationally ranked Northern Illinois, Johnson threw for a career high 393 yards and five touchdowns. He was named the games Most Valuable Player. On the season, Johnson was named MAC East Division Offensive Player of the Week three times.

=== Junior season ===
In week 1 against Western Kentucky, Johnson suffered a broken hip. He finished the game completing 25 passes for 314 yards and one touchdown.

=== Senior season ===
In his season debut, Johnson threw for 424 yards and two touchdowns against Tennessee in a 30-59 defeat where he was named MAC East Offensive Player of the Week. In week 2, Johnson led the Falcons to a 48-27 victory over Maryland. Johnson completed 36 of 55 passing attempts for a career high 491 yards (2nd in school history) and six touchdowns (T-1st school history), earning him the MAC East Offensive Player of the Week award for the second consecutive week. He was subsequently named Davey O'Brien quarterback of the week, Maxwell Football Club National Player of the week, Manning Award Star of the Week and honored as CFPA National Performer of the week. In week three, he passed for 443 yards and four touchdowns in a loss to the Memphis. The next week against Purdue, Johnson threw for his fourth straight 400-yard performance with 402 yards and a career high 43 completions on 59 attempts and one touchdown in a 35-28 upset victory. His performance earned him MAC East Offensive Player of the Week and Manning Award Star of the Week. After a victory against Buffalo, Johnson went on a three game stretch where he threw five touchdowns in each game against Massachusetts, Akron and Kent State. He won MAC East Player of the Week all three weeks. In week 10, Johnson threw three touchdown passes in a MAC East-clinching win at Western Michigan. In the MAC Championship Game he led the Falcons to a 34-14 victory against Northern Illinois. In his last game as a Falcon, he had three passing touchdowns in the GoDaddy Bowl against Georgia Southern. Johnson was named MAC Offensive Player of the Year and named First Team All-MAC. He was honored as the MAC's Vern Smith Leadership award recipient. He also earned the prestigious Sammy Baugh Award announced by Touchdown Club of Columbus. Johnson was named MAC East Offensive Player of the Week six times and passed for a school and MAC record 4,946 yards and 46 touchdowns. He was named honorable mention All-America by Sports Illustrated and a semifinalist for Davey O'Brien Award. He finished his career with 8,846 passing yards which ranks third in school history and a school-record 73 touchdown passes. On January 23, 2016, he played in the NFLPA Collegiate Bowl.

=== Statistics ===
Year	Team	Games			Passing								Rushing			
Year	Team	GP	GS	Record	Cmp	Att	Pct	Yds	Avg	TD	Int	Rtg	Att	Yds	Avg	TD
2011	Bowling Green	Redshirt (redshirt)														
2012	Bowling Green	8	0	0–0	10	28	35.7	119	4.3	1	1	76.1	8	23	2.9	0
2013	Bowling Green	14	13	9–4	237	369	64.2	3,467	9.4	25	7	161.7	117	238	2.0	5
2014	Bowling Green	1	1	0–1	25	36	69.4	314	8.7	1	0	151.9	6	-21	-3.5	0
2015	Bowling Green	14	14	10–4	383	569	67.3	4,946	8.7	46	8	164.2	113	159	1.4	4
Career		37	28	19–9	655	1,002	65.4	8,846	8.8	73	16	160.4	244	399	1.6	9

== Professional career ==
Pre-draft measurables
Height	Weight	Arm length	Hand span	40-yard dash	10-yard split	20-yard split	Vertical jump	Broad jump	Wonderlic
6 ft 0 in (1.83 m)	212 lb (96 kg)	29 1/2 in (0.75 m)	10 in (0.25 m)	4.93 s	1.75 s	2.82 s	N/A	N/A	N/A
All values from NFL Pro Day

=== Cincinnati Bengals ===
On May 5, 2016, Johnson signed as an undrafted free agent with the Cincinnati Bengals. He was released on May 16, 2015.

=== Hamilton Tiger-Cats ===
On April 26, 2017, Johnson signed with the Hamilton Tiger-Cats. He was released on June 12, 2017.

== Coaching career ==
=== Bishop McDevitt ===
In 2016, Johnson was the Quarterbacks coach for his alma mater. He coached former Wake Forest Demon Deacons commit Tayvon Bowers and appeared on QB1: Beyond the Lights.

=== Syracuse ===
In 2017, Johnson reunited with his former collegiate coach Dino Babers and became the offensive quality control assistant at Syracuse. He also joined former BGSU assistants Kim McCloud and Sean Lewis.

=== Kent State ===
In January 2018, Johnson joined Kent State as the offensive quality control coach with a focus on offense and quarterbacks under head coach Sean Lewis. He was promoted to running back coach prior to the 2020 spring season. In 2023, Johnson was promoted again to offensive coordinator and quarterbacks coach under new Kent State head coach Kenni Burns.

=== San Diego State ===
On December 5, 2023 Johnson was named the quarterbacks coach of the San Diego State Aztecs. Johnson is reunited with Lewis after spending six season together between Syracuse and Kent State.

On January 10, 2025 Johnson was promoted to offensive coordinator while maintaining his role as quarterbacks coach.
