= Roger Lewis (American football) =

American football player (born 1993)

No. 82, 18
- Position: Wide receiver

Personal information
- Born: November 27, 1993 (age 32); Columbus, Ohio, U.S.
- Listed height: 6 ft 0 in (1.83 m)
- Listed weight: 203 lb (92 kg)

Career information
- High school: Pickerington Central (Pickerington, Ohio)
- College: Bowling Green
- NFL draft: 2016: undrafted

Career history
- New York Giants (2016–2017); Tennessee Titans (2018–2019)*; Indianapolis Colts (2019)*
- * Offseason or practice squad member only

Awards and highlights
- Third-team All-American (2015); First-team All-MAC (2014, 2015); Paul Warfield Award (2015)

Career NFL statistics
- Receptions: 43
- Receiving yards: 513
- Receiving touchdowns: 4
- Stats at Pro Football Reference

Roger Lamonte Lewis Jr. (born November 27, 1993) is an American former professional football player who was a wide receiver for the New York Giants of the National Football League (NFL). He played college football for the Bowling Green Falcons, earning third-team All-American honors in 2015. In 2016, Lewis was signed as an undrafted free agent by the Giants.

== Early life ==
Lewis attended Pickerington High School Central in Pickerington, Ohio. He became a star football player at the school and he earned scholarship offers from 17 Division I schools. During his senior year in 2012, Lewis was charged with two counts of rape. It was alleged that he raped a classmate in the basement of another classmate's house on December 2, 2011. The second charge alleged that Lewis raped the same classmate again in the back seat of her car on January 6, 2012. A jury acquitted Lewis of the first charge and deadlocked on the second charge, resulting in the judge declaring a mistrial. Lewis avoided a retrial by pleading guilty to making false statements to Pickerington police. The guilty plea to falsification resulted in the rape charge being dismissed. Lewis was sentenced to three years on probation. Afterwards, he opted to attend Jireh Preparatory Academy, a post-high-school college-prep school in Matthews, North Carolina.

== College career ==
After spending one season at Jireh Preparatory Academy, Lewis committed to play college football at Bowling Green State University on January 6, 2014. In two seasons at Bowling Green, Lewis caught 23 touchdown passes and collected 2,637 receiving yards. He was named first team All-Mid-American Conference in 2014 and 2015. In 2015, he was a semifinalist for the Biletnikoff Award and was the winner of the Paul Warfield Award. On January 11, 2016, Lewis announced his decision to enter the 2016 NFL draft.

=== College statistics ===
Year	Team	Games		Receiving			
Year	Team	GP	GS	Rec	Yards	Avg	TD
2014	Bowling Green	14	14	73	1,093	15.0	7
2015	Bowling Green	14	14	85	1,544	18.2	16
Career		28	28	158	2,637	16.7	23

== Professional career ==
Pre-draft measurables
Height	Weight	Arm length	Hand span	40-yard dash	10-yard split	20-yard split	20-yard shuttle	Three-cone drill	Vertical jump	Broad jump	Bench press
6 ft 0 3/8 in (1.84 m)	201 lb (91 kg)	32 in (0.81 m)	9 3/4 in (0.25 m)	4.45 s	1.61 s	2.59 s	4.45 s	7.58 s	36.0 in (0.91 m)	10 ft 5 in (3.18 m)	8 reps

=== New York Giants ===
After going undrafted in the 2016 NFL draft, Lewis was signed by the New York Giants as an undrafted free agent. The signing of Lewis was officially announced on May 6, 2016.

Lewis was able to work his way up the depth chart after beginning his rookie season as the 7th receiver, and was able to split time with Victor Cruz throughout the season. On October 16, 2016, he made his first career catch for a 24-yard touchdown reception against the Baltimore Ravens. On November 6, he caught a 30-yard touchdown pass from Eli Manning to help his team to a 28–23 victory over the Philadelphia Eagles. He earned his first career start in place of an injured Victor Cruz against the Cincinnati Bengals on November 14, and finished the game with two catches for two yards.

Lewis started the 2017 season as the Giants' No. 4 receiver behind Odell Beckham Jr., Brandon Marshall, and Sterling Shepard. In Week 6, Lewis was forced into the starting role after Beckham and Marshall suffered season-ending injuries the previous week and Shepard was sidelined with an injury from the same game.

On September 1, 2018, Lewis was waived by the Giants.

=== Tennessee Titans ===
On October 10, 2018, Lewis was signed to the practice squad of the Tennessee Titans. He signed a reserve/future contract with the Titans on December 31. On May 7, 2019, Lewis was released by Tennessee.

=== Indianapolis Colts ===
On July 30, 2019, Lewis was signed by the Indianapolis Colts. He was released by the Colts on August 31.
