= 2015 Kent State Golden Flashes football team =

American college football season

2015 Kent State Golden Flashes football
- Conference: Mid-American Conference
- East Division
- Record: 3–9 (2–6 MAC)
- Head coach: Paul Haynes (3rd season)
- Offensive coordinator: Don Treadwell (1st season)
- Offensive scheme: Multiple
- Defensive coordinator: Brian George (3rd season)
- Base defense: 4–3
- Home stadium: Dix Stadium

2015 Mid-American Conference football standings
	Conf.			Overall
Team	W		L	W		L
East Division
Bowling Green x$	7	–	1	10	–	4
Ohio	5	–	3	8	–	5
Akron	5	–	3	8	–	5
Buffalo	3	–	5	5	–	7
Kent State	2	–	6	3	–	9
Miami (OH)	2	–	6	3	–	9
UMass	2	–	6	3	–	9
West Division
Northern Illinois xy	6	–	2	8	–	6
Western Michigan x	6	–	2	8	–	5
Toledo x	6	–	2	10	–	2
Central Michigan x	6	–	2	7	–	6
Ball State	2	–	6	3	–	9
Eastern Michigan	0	–	8	1	–	11
Championship: Bowling Green 34, Northern Illinois 14
$ – Conference champion; x – Division champion/co-champions; y – Championship game participant

The 2015 Kent State Golden Flashes football team represented Kent State University in the 2015 NCAA Division I FBS football season. They were led by third-year head coach Paul Haynes and played their home games at Dix Stadium as a member of the East Division of the Mid-American Conference. They finished the season 3–9, 2–6 in MAC play to finish in a three-way tie for fifth place in the East Division.

== Schedule ==
Date	Time	Opponent	Site	TV	Result	Attendance
September 5	2:00 pm	at Illinois*	Memorial Stadium; Champaign, IL	BTN	L 3–52	36,693
September 12	6:00 pm	Delaware State (FCS)*	Dix Stadium; Kent, OH	ESPN3	W 45–13	15,091
September 19	12:00 pm	at Minnesota*	TCF Bank Stadium; Minneapolis, MN	BTN	L 7–10	52,823
September 26	3:30 pm	Marshall*	Dix Stadium; Kent, OH	ASN	L 29–36 ^{2OT}	15,424
October 3	3:30 pm	Miami (OH)^{†}	Dix Stadium; Kent, OH	ESPN3	W 20–14	10,991
October 10	3:00 pm	at No. 24 Toledo	Glass Bowl; Toledo, OH	ESPN3	L 7–38	23,118
October 17	3:30 pm	at Massachusetts	Warren McGuirk Alumni Stadium; Hadley, MA	ESPN3	W 15–10	15,217
October 24	1:00 pm	Bowling Green	Dix Stadium; Kent, OH (Anniversary Award)	ESPN3	L 0–48	14,739
November 5	7:00 pm	Buffalo	Dix Stadium; Kent, OH	ESPN3	L 17–18	10,379
November 10	8:00 pm	at Ohio	Peden Stadium; Athens, OH	ESPNU	L 0–27	15,654
November 18	8:00 pm	Central Michigan	Dix Stadium; Kent, OH	ESPNU	L 14–27	8,742
November 27	12:00 pm	at Akron	InfoCision Stadium; Akron, OH (Wagon Wheel)	ASN	L 0–20	16,391
*Non-conference game; ^{†}Homecoming; Rankings from AP Poll released prior to game; All times are in Eastern time

Schedule source:

== Game summaries ==
=== At Illinois ===
	1	2	3	4	Total
Golden Flashes	0	0	0	3	3
Fighting Illini	28	10	7	7	52

=== Delaware State ===
	1	2	3	4	Total
Hornets	0	6	0	7	13
Golden Flashes	16	20	9	0	45

=== At Minnesota ===
	1	2	3	4	Total
Golden Flashes	0	0	7	0	7
Golden Gophers	3	7	0	0	10

=== Marshall ===
	1	2	3	4	OT	2OT	Total
Thundering Herd	7	0	7	8	7	7	36
Golden Flashes	6	7	6	3	7	0	29

=== Miami (OH) ===
	1	2	3	4	Total
RedHawks	0	0	0	14	14
Golden Flashes	6	7	7	0	20

=== At Toledo ===
	1	2	3	4	Total
Golden Flashes	7	0	0	0	7
#24 Rockets	7	17	7	7	38

=== At Massachusetts ===
	1	2	3	4	Total
Golden Flashes	0	10	3	2	15
Minutemen	0	10	0	0	10

=== Bowling Green ===
	1	2	3	4	Total
Falcons	14	17	10	7	48
Golden Flashes	0	0	0	0	0

=== Buffalo ===
	1	2	3	4	Total
Bulls	6	0	0	12	18
Golden Flashes	0	10	7	0	17

=== At Ohio ===
	1	2	3	4	Total
Golden Flashes	0	0	0	0	0
Bobcats	7	3	10	7	27

=== Central Michigan ===
	1	2	3	4	Total
Chippewas	17	3	7	0	27
Golden Flashes	0	14	0	0	14

=== At Akron ===
	1	2	3	4	Total
Golden Flashes	0	0	0	0	0
Zips	7	7	3	3	20
