= 2015 NCAA Division I FBS football season =

American college football season

2015 NCAA Division I FBS season
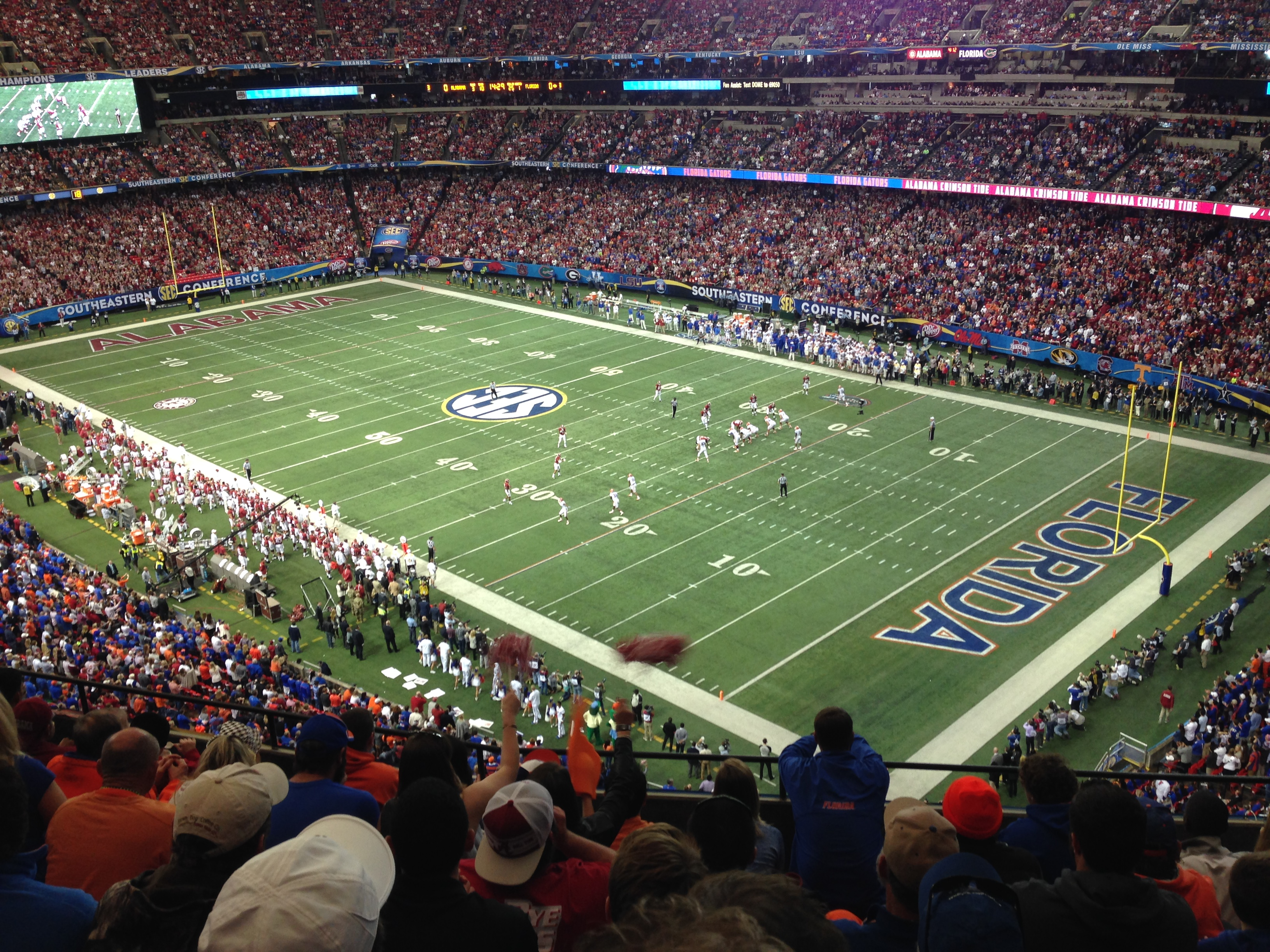
- 2015 SEC Championship - Alabama VS Florida
- Number of teams: 127 full members + 1 transitional
- Duration: September 3, 2015 – December 12, 2015
- Preseason AP No. 1: Ohio State

Postseason
- Duration: December 19, 2015 – January 11, 2016
- Bowl games: 41
- AP Poll No. 1: Alabama
- Coaches Poll No. 1: Alabama
- Heisman Trophy: Derrick Henry (running back, Alabama)

College Football Playoff
- 2016 College Football Playoff National Championship
- Site: University of Phoenix Stadium; Glendale, Arizona
- Champion(s): Alabama

NCAA Division I FBS football seasons
- ← 2014 2016 →

The 2015 NCAA Division I FBS football season was the highest level of college football competition in the United States organized by the National Collegiate Athletic Association (NCAA). The regular season began on September 3, 2015, and ended on December 12, 2015. The postseason concluded on January 11, 2016, with Alabama defeating Clemson in the 2016 College Football Playoff National Championship. This was the second season of the College Football Playoff (CFP) championship system.

== Rule changes ==
The following rule changes have been made by the NCAA Football Rules Committee for the 2015 season:

- Eight-man officiating crews are made standard in FBS with the addition of the center judge position. Various FBS conferences experimented with eight-man crews in the 2013 and 2014 seasons.
- Unsportsmanlike conduct penalties of 15 yards will be called on players who pull or yank opponents off piles.
- A 10-second runoff and reset of the play clock to 40 seconds will occur if a defensive player's helmet comes off within the final minute of either half. Previously, the play clock was set to 25 seconds and no runoff occurred.
- The five-yard penalty for a first offense sideline warning has been removed, modifying a 2008 rule change. Moving forward, the second offense will be penalized five yards, followed by 15 yards (unsportsmanlike conduct) starting with the third offense.
- Officials will require players with illegal equipment (e.g., "crop-top" jerseys and writing messages on eye black) to leave the field for one play to correct it. Teams may use a time-out to correct the equipment and avoid the player having to sit out the play.
- Instant replay can be used to review if the kicking team blocked the receiving team before an onside kick has gone 10 yards.
- Teams must have 22 minutes for pre-game warmups, which can be shortened by mutual agreement of both teams.
- The play clock will be reset to 40 seconds if the play clock reaches 25 seconds before the ball is ready for play. Previously, the play clock was reset if the play clock ran to 20 seconds.
- Non-standard/overbuilt facemasks are prohibited.

A proposed rule to change the ineligible downfield rule from three yards to one yard past the line of scrimmage was tabled and not voted on; however it will be a point of emphasis for the season.

The use of advanced technology in games (e.g., wireless communication between on-field players and the bench, use of tablets by coaches for non-medical reasons, helmet cameras for players) is being studied by a committee for possible future implementation.

== Conference realignment ==
=== Membership changes ===
School	Former conference	New conference
Charlotte	FCS independent	Conference USA
Navy	FBS independent	The American
UAB	Conference USA	Terminated football program

Charlotte transitioned from the Football Championship Subdivision (FCS) and played its first season in FBS as a provisional member, becoming a football-sponsoring member of Conference USA after joining as a non-football member in 2013.

UAB controversially shut down its football program following the 2014 season, after school administrators claimed that rising monetary costs made fielding an FBS team unfeasible. Following public outcry and fundraising efforts, the school announced less than six months later that the football team would be reinstated. UAB football returned to FBS and Conference USA for the 2017 season.

== Other headlines ==
- June 1 – UAB, which had dropped football after the 2014 season, announced that it would reinstate it as early as 2016.
- July 21 – UAB announced that it had pushed back the return of football to the 2017 season.
- September 1 – The Sun Belt Conference announced that Coastal Carolina would become a full member of the conference on July 1, 2016. The Coastal Carolina football team, a member of the FCS Big South Conference along with the rest of the athletic program at the time of the announcement, began a transition to FBS after the 2015 season, joined Sun Belt football in 2017, and became fully bowl-eligible in 2018.
- January 13, 2016 – The NCAA Division I council approved a rule that, from the 2016 season forward, allows FBS conferences to stage championship games regardless of their current membership numbers. The new rule, as originally proposed by the Big 12 Conference and amended by the Big Ten Conference, stipulates that a conference with fewer than 12 members can stage a championship game under either of the following circumstances:
  - The game involves two division winners, with each division having played a round-robin schedule.
  - The game involves the top two teams in the conference standings after a full round-robin conference schedule.

== Regular season top 10 matchups ==
Rankings reflect the AP Poll. Rankings for Week 10 and beyond will list College Football Playoff Rankings first and AP Poll second. Teams that fail to be a top 10 team for one poll or the other will be noted.

- Week 2
  - No. 5 Michigan State defeated No. 7 Oregon 31–28 (Spartan Stadium, East Lansing, Michigan)
- Week 7
  - No. 10 Alabama defeated No. 9 Texas A&M 41–23 (Kyle Field, College Station, Texas)
  - No. 6 LSU defeated No. 8 Florida 35–28 (Tiger Stadium, Baton Rouge, Louisiana)
- Week 10
  - No. 4/7 Alabama defeated No. 2/4 LSU 30–16 (Bryant-Denny Stadium, Tuscaloosa, Alabama)
- Week 12
  - No. 10/10 Baylor defeated No. 6/4 Oklahoma State 45–35 (Boone Pickens Stadium, Stillwater, Oklahoma)
  - No. 9/9 Michigan State defeated No. 3/2 Ohio State 17–14 (Ohio Stadium, Columbus, Ohio)
- Week 13
  - No. 3/5 Oklahoma defeated No. 11/9 Oklahoma State 58–23 (Boone Pickens Stadium, Stillwater, Oklahoma)
  - No. 8/8 Ohio State defeated No. 10/12 Michigan 42–13 (Michigan Stadium, Ann Arbor, Michigan)
  - No. 9/13 Stanford defeated No. 6/4 Notre Dame 38–36 (Stanford Stadium, Stanford, California)
- Week 14
  - No. 5/5 Michigan State defeated No. 4/4 Iowa 16–13 (Big 10 Championship Game, Indianapolis, Indiana)
  - No. 1/1 Clemson defeated No. 10/8 North Carolina 45–37 (ACC Championship Game, Charlotte, North Carolina)

== Upsets ==
=== Jacksonville State at Auburn game ===
On September 12, Auburn avoided a defeat that would have ranked with the biggest upsets in college football history with an overtime touchdown run to a 27–20 win over FCS foe Jacksonville State. Auburn had to score a touchdown in the final minute of regulation just to tie the game and then had to convert another touchdown in Auburn's first possession in overtime to win. No FCS team has defeated a ranked FBS team since August 31, 2013, when Eastern Washington beat Oregon State 49–46. An Auburn loss would have compared with Michigan's loss to Appalachian State on September 3, 2007. Jacksonville State, 41-point underdogs entering Saturday's game, nearly became just the second FCS team to defeat an AP Top 10 FBS opponent. After the game, JSU would jump from #5 in the FCS Polls to #1, and Auburn fell from #6 in the FBS polls to #18.

=== Red River Rivalry ===
On October 10, then 1-4 Texas stunned #10 4-0 Oklahoma with a thrilling win in the Red River Rivalry, in which the Longhorns were 17 point underdogs. Texas would go on to win the game 24-17. The Sooners spurred a late comeback, but failed to stop Texas from running out the clock on the final drive of the game.

=== Upsets involving officiating ===
==== Miami vs. Duke ====
On October 31, Miami beat #22 ranked Duke 30–27 on a game-winning kickoff return for a touchdown that included eight laterals. However, the Atlantic Coast Conference acknowledged the next day that the kickoff return touchdown should not have counted as officials made four major errors during the play:

- A Miami player's knee was down before releasing one of the eight laterals.
- An illegal block should have been called during the return at Miami's 16-yard line, which would have given the Hurricanes an untimed down at their own 8-yard line.
- Miami should have been penalized for a bench player entering the field of play during the return, although this would not have changed the touchdown ruling.
- A penalty for an illegal block in the back that was rescinded — initially negating Miami's touchdown before officials conferred — was called correctly, but that the referee didn't properly communicate why the decision was made.

==== Nebraska vs. Michigan State ====
On November 7, Nebraska defeated Michigan State by a score of 39–38. Nebraska ran a 91-yard scoring drive in 38 seconds, capped by Tommy Armstrong Jr.'s 30-yard touchdown pass to Brandon Reilly, leaving 17 seconds left in the fourth quarter. Before the catch, Reilly went out of bounds on his route, making him an ineligible receiver. Replay officials determined that Michigan State cornerback Jermaine Edmondson had forced him out of bounds, although replay footage seemed to show that Reilly had gone out of bounds on his own accord. The ruling on the field stood, upholding Nebraska's game-winning touchdown. After the game Bill Carollo, the Big Ten's coordinator of officials, said in a statement via ESPN: "They can't review whether it was a force out/contact on the play. They can only review if there was clear evidence of no contact and he (Reilly) re-established himself in the field of play. If he goes out of bounds on his own with no contact, it's an illegal touch. Therefore, the call stood."

== FCS team wins over FBS teams ==
Italics denotes FCS teams.

Date	Visiting team	Home team	Site	Result	Attendance	Ref.
September 4	No. 20 (FCS) Fordham	Army	Michie Stadium • West Point, New York	37–35	22,523	
September 5	North Dakota	Wyoming	War Memorial Stadium • Laramie, Wyoming	24–13	23,669	
September 5	Portland State	Washington State	Martin Stadium • Pullman, Washington	24–17	24,302	
September 5	No. 16 (FCS) South Dakota State	Kansas	Memorial Stadium • Lawrence, Kansas	41–38	30,144	
September 19	Furman	UCF	Bright House Networks Stadium • Orlando, Florida	16–15	36,484	
September 26	No. 9 (FCS) James Madison	SMU	Gerald J. Ford Stadium • University Park, Texas	48–45	22,314	
October 3	No. 18 (FCS) Liberty	Georgia State	Georgia Dome • Atlanta, Georgia	41–33	17,765	
October 10	No. 25 (FCS) Portland State	North Texas	Apogee Stadium • Denton, Texas	66–7	19,801	
November 21	No. 25 (FCS) The Citadel	South Carolina	Williams–Brice Stadium • Columbia, South Carolina (SEC Nation)	23–22	77,241	
^{#}Rankings from AP Poll released prior to game.

== Updated stadiums ==
No FBS programs opened new stadiums for the 2015 season. However, one school played its first season in FBS, and several other programs expanded or renovated their stadiums:

- Charlotte, playing its first season in FBS, debuted at the on-campus Jerry Richardson Stadium. The stadium opened for the 49ers' first season in 2013 with a capacity of 15,314, but was designed for quick expansion to as much as 40,000.
- Kentucky debuted a major renovation to Commonwealth Stadium. A$110 million project reduced the capacity from 67,530 to 61,000, and added a new recruiting plaza in the east end zone surrounded by a new student section, more than 20 new luxury boxes and 2,000 new club seats, new home-team facilities, a revamped exterior, and improved concourses.
- UCF took out about 2,000 seats from the east side of Bright House Networks Stadium, replacing them with a new club seating section with a capacity of about 1,000 that includes a beach area.
- Auburn debuted the largest video board in college football in Jordan–Hare Stadium. The video board measures 190 feet by 57. The project was expected to cost $13.9 million.
- Duke featured a newly renovated Wallace Wade Stadium. The renovations included removal of the track and lowering of the field by several feet; more seating capacity near field level along both sidelines and the north end zone; the replacement of bleachers on the west side of the stadium with Duke blue seats; new brick facades around much of the field; a brand-new, much larger video board and new speakers; a refresh of the concourse area around the top of the bowl, with new sidewalks and brick separating the concourse from the seating area; and new concession booths, restrooms, and concourse lighting along with a new elevator tower. Construction on a new press box, luxury boxes, and attached seats was ongoing throughout the season, and was expected to be complete in time for the 2016 season. These marked the first major upgrades to Wallace Wade Stadium in over 70 years.
- Kansas State debuted the Vanier Football Complex in the north end zone of Bill Snyder Family Stadium. This feature includes new seating, a video board, offices, locker rooms and strength training facilities. kstatesports.com
- Cincinnati debuted renovations to Nippert Stadium that increased the capacity to 40,000 and added premium seating, a new press box, a new pavilion, additional restrooms, upgraded concessions and improved concourses.
- Ole Miss announced plans to renovate Vaught–Hemingway Stadium during the 2015 season and the 2015–16 offseason. The project was intended to bring the stadium's ultimate capacity to 64,038. The stadium was to be turned into a complete bowl, adding club level seating, restrooms, concessions, etc. The renovation was planned for completion by the start of the 2016–17 season. This renovation was part of the Forward Together campaign, which also gave the Rebels a new basketball arena, The Pavilion at Ole Miss, right next to the football stadium.
- Texas A&M completed renovations to the west side and facade of Kyle Field, reducing the capacity from the previous season. The project cost over $450 million.

== Conference standings ==
2015 American Athletic Conference football standings
	Conf.			Overall
Team	W		L	W		L
East Division
Temple x	7	–	1	10	–	4
South Florida	6	–	2	8	–	5
Cincinnati	4	–	4	7	–	6
UConn	4	–	4	6	–	7
East Carolina	3	–	5	5	–	7
UCF	0	–	8	0	–	12
West Division
No. 8 Houston xy$	7	–	1	13	–	1
No. 18 Navy x	7	–	1	11	–	2
Memphis	5	–	3	9	–	4
Tulsa	3	–	5	6	–	7
Tulane	1	–	7	3	–	9
SMU	1	–	7	2	–	10
Championship: Houston 24, Temple 13
$ – Conference champion; x – Division champion/co-champions; y – Championship game participant; As of December 31, 2015; Rankings from AP Poll

2015 Atlantic Coast Conference football standings
	Conf.			Overall
Team	W		L	W		L
Atlantic Division
No. 2 Clemson x$^	8	–	0	14	–	1
No. 14 Florida State	6	–	2	10	–	3
Louisville	5	–	3	8	–	5
NC State	3	–	5	7	–	6
Syracuse	2	–	6	4	–	8
Wake Forest	1	–	7	3	–	9
Boston College	0	–	8	3	–	9
Coastal Division
No. 15 North Carolina x	8	–	0	11	–	3
Pittsburgh	6	–	2	8	–	5
Miami (FL)	5	–	3	8	–	5
Duke	4	–	4	8	–	5
Virginia Tech	4	–	4	7	–	6
Virginia	3	–	5	4	–	8
Georgia Tech	1	–	7	3	–	9
Championship: Clemson 45, North Carolina 37
^ – College Football Playoff participant; $ – Conference champion; x – Division champion/co-champions; Rankings from AP Poll

2015 Big Ten Conference football standings
	Conf.			Overall
Team	W		L	W		L
East Division
No. 6 Michigan State xy$^	7	–	1	12	–	2
No. 4 Ohio State x	7	–	1	12	–	1
No. 12 Michigan	6	–	2	10	–	3
Penn State	4	–	4	7	–	6
Indiana	2	–	6	6	–	7
Rutgers	1	–	7	4	–	8
Maryland	1	–	7	3	–	9
West Division
No. 9 Iowa xy	8	–	0	12	–	2
No. 23 Northwestern	6	–	2	10	–	3
No. 21 Wisconsin	6	–	2	10	–	3
Nebraska	3	–	5	6	–	7
Minnesota	2	–	6	6	–	7
Illinois	2	–	6	5	–	7
Purdue	1	–	7	2	–	10
Championship: Michigan State 16, Iowa 13
^ – College Football Playoff participant; $ – Conference champion; x – Division champion/co-champions; y – Championship game participant; Rankings from AP Poll

2015 Big 12 Conference football standings
	Conf.			Overall
Team	W		L	W		L
No. 5 Oklahoma $^	8	–	1	11	–	2
No. 20 Oklahoma State	7	–	2	10	–	3
No. 7 TCU	7	–	2	11	–	2
No. 13 Baylor	6	–	3	10	–	3
West Virginia	4	–	5	8	–	5
Texas Tech	4	–	5	7	–	6
Texas	4	–	5	5	–	7
Kansas State	3	–	6	6	–	7
Iowa State	2	–	7	3	–	9
Kansas	0	–	9	0	–	12
^ – College Football Playoff participant; $ – Conference champion; Rankings from AP Poll

2015 Conference USA football standings
	Conf.			Overall
Team	W		L	W		L
East Division
No. 24 Western Kentucky x$	8	–	0	12	–	2
Middle Tennessee	6	–	2	7	–	6
Marshall	6	–	2	10	–	3
FIU	3	–	5	5	–	7
Old Dominion	3	–	5	5	–	7
Florida Atlantic	3	–	5	3	–	9
Charlotte*	0	–	8	2	–	10
West Division
Southern Miss x	7	–	1	9	–	5
Louisiana Tech	6	–	2	9	–	4
UTSA	3	–	5	3	–	9
UTEP	3	–	5	5	–	7
Rice	3	–	5	5	–	7
North Texas	1	–	7	1	–	11
Championship: Western Kentucky 45, Southern Miss 28
$ – Conference champion; x – Division champion/co-champions; * Ineligible for postseason bowl due to transition from FCS; As of January 12, 2015; Rankings from AP Poll

2015 Mid-American Conference football standings
	Conf.			Overall
Team	W		L	W		L
East Division
Bowling Green x$	7	–	1	10	–	4
Ohio	5	–	3	8	–	5
Akron	5	–	3	8	–	5
Buffalo	3	–	5	5	–	7
Kent State	2	–	6	3	–	9
Miami (OH)	2	–	6	3	–	9
UMass	2	–	6	3	–	9
West Division
Northern Illinois xy	6	–	2	8	–	6
Western Michigan x	6	–	2	8	–	5
Toledo x	6	–	2	10	–	2
Central Michigan x	6	–	2	7	–	6
Ball State	2	–	6	3	–	9
Eastern Michigan	0	–	8	1	–	11
Championship: Bowling Green 34, Northern Illinois 14
$ – Conference champion; x – Division champion/co-champions; y – Championship game participant

2015 Mountain West Conference football standings
	Conf.			Overall
Team	W		L	W		L
Mountain Division
Air Force x	6	–	2	8	–	6
New Mexico	5	–	3	7	–	6
Utah State	5	–	3	6	–	7
Boise State	5	–	3	9	–	4
Colorado State	5	–	3	7	–	6
Wyoming	2	–	6	2	–	10
West Division
San Diego State x$	8	–	0	11	–	3
Nevada	4	–	4	7	–	6
San Jose State	4	–	4	6	–	7
Fresno State	2	–	6	3	–	9
UNLV	2	–	6	3	–	9
Hawaii	0	–	8	3	–	10
Championship: San Diego State 27, Air Force 24
$ – Conference champion; x – Division champion/co-champions; Rankings from AP Poll

2015 Pac-12 Conference football standings
	Conf.			Overall
Team	W		L	W		L
North Division
No. 3 Stanford xy$	8	–	1	12	–	2
No. 19 Oregon	7	–	2	9	–	4
Washington State	6	–	3	9	–	4
California	4	–	5	8	–	5
Washington	4	–	5	7	–	6
Oregon State	0	–	9	2	–	10
South Division
USC xy	6	–	3	8	–	6
No. 17 Utah x	6	–	3	10	–	3
UCLA	5	–	4	8	–	5
Arizona State	4	–	5	6	–	7
Arizona	3	–	6	7	–	6
Colorado	1	–	8	4	–	9
Championship: Stanford 41, USC 22
$ – Conference champion; x – Division champion/co-champions; y – Championship game participant; Rankings from AP Poll

2015 Southeastern Conference football standings
	Conf.			Overall
Team	W		L	W		L
Eastern Division
No. 25 Florida x	7	–	1	10	–	4
No. 22 Tennessee	5	–	3	9	–	4
Georgia	5	–	3	10	–	3
Vanderbilt	2	–	6	4	–	8
Kentucky	2	–	6	5	–	7
Missouri*	1	–	7	5	–	7
South Carolina	1	–	7	3	–	9
Western Division
No. 1 Alabama x$#^	7	–	1	14	–	1
No. 10 Ole Miss	6	–	2	10	–	3
Arkansas	5	–	3	8	–	5
No. 16 LSU *	5	–	3	9	–	3
Texas A&M	4	–	4	8	–	5
Mississippi State	4	–	4	9	–	4
Auburn	2	–	6	7	–	6
Championship: Alabama 29, Florida 15
# – College Football Playoff champion; ^ – College Football Playoff participant; $ – Conference champion; x – Division champion/co-champions; * LSU and Missouri vacated all wins due to NCAA violations.; Rankings from AP Poll

2015 Sun Belt Conference football standings
	Conf.			Overall
Team	W		L	W		L
Arkansas State $	8	–	0	9	–	4
Appalachian State	7	–	1	11	–	2
Georgia Southern	6	–	2	9	–	4
Georgia State	5	–	3	6	–	7
South Alabama	3	–	5	5	–	7
Idaho	3	–	5	4	–	8
Louisiana–Lafayette	3	–	5	4	–	8
Troy	3	–	5	4	–	8
New Mexico State	3	–	5	3	–	9
Texas State	2	–	6	3	–	9
Louisiana–Monroe	1	–	7	2	–	11
$ – Conference champion

2015 NCAA Division I FBS independents football records
	Conf.			Overall
Team	W		L	W		L
No. 11 Notre Dame		–		10	–	3
BYU		–		9	–	4
Army		–		2	–	10
Rankings from AP Poll

== Conference summaries ==
Rankings reflect the Week 14 AP Poll before the conference championship games were played.

=== Power 5 Conferences ===
Conference	Champion	Runner-up	Score	Offensive Player of the Year	Defensive Player of the Year	Coach of the Year
ACC	No. 1 Clemson ^{CFP}	No. 10 North Carolina	45–37	Deshaun Watson, QB, Clemson	Jeremy Cash, S, Duke	Dabo Swinney, Clemson
Big 12	No. 3 Oklahoma ^{CFP}	No. 14 Oklahoma State	N/A	Baker Mayfield, QB, Oklahoma	Emmanuel Ogbah, DE, Oklahoma State & Andrew Billings, DT, Baylor	Bob Stoops, Oklahoma
Big Ten	No. 5 Michigan State ^{CFP}	No. 4 Iowa	16–13	Ezekiel Elliott, RB, Ohio State	Carl Nassib, DE, Penn St	Kirk Ferentz, Iowa
Pac-12	No. 7 Stanford	No. 20 USC	41–22	Christian McCaffrey, RB, Stanford	DeForest Buckner, DE, Oregon	Mike Leach, Washington State & David Shaw, Stanford
SEC	No. 2 Alabama ^{CFP}	No. 18 Florida	29–15	Derrick Henry, RB, Alabama	Reggie Ragland, LB, Alabama	Jim McElwain, Florida

=== Group of Five Conferences ===
Conference	Champion	Runner-up	Score	Offensive Player of the Year	Defensive Player of the Year	Coach of the Year
AAC	No. 17 Houston	No. 20 Temple	24–13	Keenan Reynolds, QB, Navy	Tyler Matakevich, LB, Temple	Ken Niumatalolo, Navy & Tom Herman, Houston
C-USA	WKU	Southern Miss	45–28	Brandon Doughty, QB, WKU (MVP); Nick Mullens, QB, Southern Miss (Offensive POY)	Evan McKelvey, LB, Marshall	Todd Monken, Southern Miss
MAC	Bowling Green	Northern Illinois	34–14	Matt Johnson, QB, Bowling Green	Jatavis Brown, LB, Akron	Matt Campbell, Toledo
MW	San Diego State	Air Force	27–24	Donnel Pumphrey, RB, San Diego State	Damontae Kazee, CB, San Diego State	Rocky Long, San Diego State
Sun Belt	Arkansas State	N/A	N/A	Nick Arbuckle, QB, Georgia State (MVP) & Larry Rose III, RB, New Mexico State (Offensive POY)	Ronald Blair, DE, Appalachian State	Trent Miles, Georgia State

^{CFP} College Football Playoff participant

== Postseason ==
=== Bowl selections ===
Since the 2014–15 postseason, six College Football Playoff (CFP) bowl games have hosted two semi-final playoff games on a rotating basis. For this season, the Orange Bowl and the Cotton Bowl Classic will host the semi-final games, with the winners advancing to the 2016 College Football Playoff National Championship at University of Phoenix Stadium in Glendale, Arizona.

==== Bowl eligible teams ====
- American Athletic Conference (8): Memphis, Houston, Temple, Navy, South Florida, Cincinnati, Connecticut, Tulsa
- Atlantic Coast Conference (9): Clemson, Florida State, Duke, Pittsburgh, North Carolina, Miami (FL), North Carolina State, Louisville, Virginia Tech
- Big 12 Conference (7): Baylor, TCU, Oklahoma State, Oklahoma, Texas Tech, West Virginia, Kansas State
- Big Ten Conference (8): Ohio State, Michigan State, Iowa, Indiana, Michigan, Penn State, Northwestern, Wisconsin
- Conference USA (5): Western Kentucky, Marshall, Louisiana Tech, Southern Mississippi, Middle Tennessee State
- Independents (2): Notre Dame, BYU
- Mid-American Conference (7): Toledo, Bowling Green, Northern Illinois, Western Michigan, Ohio, Central Michigan, Akron
- Mountain West Conference (7): Boise State, San Diego State, Air Force, Nevada, New Mexico, Utah State, Colorado State
- Pac-12 Conference (10): Stanford, Utah, UCLA, Washington State, USC, Oregon, Arizona, California, Arizona State, Washington
- Southeastern Conference (10): LSU, Alabama, Florida, Ole Miss, Mississippi State, Texas A&M, Georgia, Tennessee, Arkansas, Auburn
- Sun Belt Conference (4): Georgia Southern, Georgia State, Appalachian State, Arkansas State

Total: 77

==== Bowl ineligible teams ====
- American Athletic Conference (4): Central Florida, East Carolina, SMU, Tulane
- Atlantic Coast Conference (5): Boston College, Georgia Tech, Syracuse, Wake Forest, Virginia
- Big 12 Conference (3): Iowa State, Kansas, Texas
- Big Ten Conference (6): Illinois, Maryland, Minnesota*, Nebraska*, Purdue, Rutgers
- Conference USA (8): Charlotte, North Texas, UTSA, Florida Atlantic, Florida International, UTEP, Rice, Old Dominion
- Independents (1): Army
- Mid-American Conference (6): Buffalo, Miami (OH), Eastern Michigan, Massachusetts, Ball State, Kent State
- Mountain West Conference (5): Wyoming, Hawaii, Fresno State, UNLV, San José State*
- Pac-12 Conference (2): Oregon State, Colorado
- Southeastern Conference (4): South Carolina, Vanderbilt, Missouri, Kentucky
- Sun Belt Conference (7): Louisiana-Lafayette, New Mexico State, Louisiana-Monroe, Idaho, South Alabama, Troy, Texas State

Note: Teams with Asterisk(*) qualified for bowls based on Academic Progress Rate, despite not having a bowl eligible record

Total: 51

=== College Football Playoff ===
Semifinals
December 31 – Orange Bowl; Sun Life Stadium, Miami Gardens
1	Clemson	37
4	Oklahoma	17
December 31 – Cotton Bowl; AT&T Stadium, Arlington
2	Alabama	38
3	Michigan State	0

Championship
January 11 – National Championship; University of Phoenix Stadium, Glendale
1	Clemson	40
2	Alabama	45

=== Conference performance in bowl games ===
Conference	Total games	Wins	Losses	Pct.
SEC	11	9	2	.818
ACC	9	4	5	.444
Big Ten	10	5	5	.500
Pac-12	10	6	4	.600
Big 12	7	3	4	.429
MW	8	4	4	.500
The American	8	2	6	.250
C-USA	5	3	2	.600
MAC	7	3	4	.429
Independents	2	0	2	.000
Sun Belt	4	2	2	.500

== Rankings ==
=== Final CFP rankings ===
CFP	School	Record	Bowl Game
1	Clemson Tigers	13–0	Orange Bowl
2	Alabama Crimson Tide	12–1	Cotton Bowl
3	Michigan State Spartans	12–1	Cotton Bowl
4	Oklahoma Sooners	11–1	Orange Bowl
5	Iowa Hawkeyes	12–1	Rose Bowl
6	Stanford Cardinal	11–2	Rose Bowl
7	Ohio State Buckeyes	11–1	Fiesta Bowl
8	Notre Dame Fighting Irish	10–2	Fiesta Bowl
9	Florida State Seminoles	10–2	Peach Bowl
10	North Carolina Tar Heels	11–2	Russell Athletic Bowl
11	TCU Horned Frogs	10–2	Alamo Bowl
12	Ole Miss Rebels	9–3	Sugar Bowl
13	Northwestern Wildcats	10–2	Outback Bowl
14	Michigan Wolverines	9–3	Citrus Bowl
15	Oregon Ducks	9–3	Alamo Bowl
16	Oklahoma State Cowboys	10–2	Sugar Bowl
17	Baylor Bears	9–3	Russell Athletic Bowl
18	Houston Cougars	12–1	Peach Bowl
19	Florida Gators	10–3	Citrus Bowl
20	LSU Tigers	8–3	Texas Bowl
21	Navy Midshipmen	10–2	Military Bowl
22	Utah Utes	9–3	Las Vegas Bowl
23	Tennessee Volunteers	8–4	Outback Bowl
24	Temple Owls	10–2	Boca Raton Bowl
25	USC Trojans	8–5	Holiday Bowl

=== Final rankings ===
Rank	Associated Press	Coaches' Poll
1	Alabama (14–1) (61)	Alabama (14–1) (56)
2	Clemson (14–1)	Clemson (14–1)
3	Stanford (12–2)	Stanford (12–2)
4	Ohio State (12–1)	Ohio State (12–1)
5	Oklahoma (11–2)	Oklahoma (11–2)
6	Michigan State (12–2)	Michigan State (12–2)
7	TCU (11–2)	TCU (11–2)
8	Houston (13–1)	Houston (13–1)
9	Iowa (12–2)	Ole Miss (10–3)
10	Ole Miss (10–3)	Iowa (12–2)
11	Notre Dame (10–3)	Michigan (10–3)
12	Michigan (10–3)	Notre Dame (10–3)
13	Baylor (10–3)	Baylor (10–3)
14	Florida State (10–3)	Florida State (10–3)
15	North Carolina (11–3)	North Carolina (11–3)
16	LSU (9–3)	Utah (10–3)
17	Utah (10–3)	LSU (9–3)
18	Navy (11–2)	Navy (11–2)
19	Oregon (9–4)	Oklahoma State (10–3)
20	Oklahoma State (10–3)	Oregon (9–4)
21	Wisconsin (10–3)	Wisconsin (10–3)
22	Tennessee (9–4)	Northwestern (10–3)
23	Northwestern (10–3)	Tennessee (9–4)
24	Western Kentucky (12–2)	Georgia (10–3)
25	Florida (10–4)	Florida (10–4)

== Awards and honors ==
=== Heisman Trophy voting ===
The Heisman Trophy is given to the year's most outstanding player

Player	School	Position	1st	2nd	3rd	Total
Derrick Henry	Alabama	RB	378	277	144	1,832
Christian McCaffrey	Stanford	RB	290	246	177	1,539
Deshaun Watson	Clemson	QB	148	240	241	1,165
Baker Mayfield	Oklahoma	QB	34	55	122	334
Keenan Reynolds	Navy	QB	20	17	86	180
Leonard Fournette	LSU	RB	10	25	30	110
Dalvin Cook	Florida State	RB	7	18	22	79
Ezekiel Elliott	Ohio State	RB	5	7	28	57
Connor Cook	Michigan State	QB	2	3	1	13
Trevone Boykin	TCU	QB	1	3	4	13

=== Other overall ===
- Archie Griffin Award (MVP): Deshaun Watson, Clemson
- AP Player of the Year: Christian McCaffrey, Stanford
- Chic Harley Award (Player of the Year): Christian McCaffrey, Stanford
- Maxwell Award (top player): Derrick Henry, Alabama
- SN Player of the Year: Baker Mayfield, Oklahoma
- Walter Camp Award (top player): Derrick Henry, Alabama

=== Special overall ===
- Burlsworth Trophy (top player who began as walk-on): Baker Mayfield, Oklahoma
- Paul Hornung Award (most versatile player): Christian McCaffrey, Stanford
- Campbell Trophy ("academic Heisman"): Ty Darlington, Oklahoma
- Wuerffel Trophy (humanitarian-athlete): Ty Darlington, Oklahoma

=== Offense ===
Quarterback

- Davey O'Brien Award (quarterback): Deshaun Watson, Clemson
- Johnny Unitas Award (senior/4th year quarterback): Connor Cook, Michigan State
- Kellen Moore Award (quarterback): Baker Mayfield, Oklahoma
- Manning Award (quarterback): Deshaun Watson, Clemson
- Sammy Baugh Trophy (passing quarterback): Matt Johnson, Bowling Green

Running back

- Doak Walker Award (running back): Derrick Henry, Alabama
- Jim Brown Trophy (running back): Dalvin Cook, Florida State

Wide receiver

- Fred Biletnikoff Award (wide receiver): Corey Coleman, Baylor
- Paul Warfield Trophy (wide receiver): Roger Lewis, Bowling Green

Tight end

- John Mackey Award (tight end): Hunter Henry, Arkansas
- Ozzie Newsome Award (tight end): Jake Butt, Michigan

Lineman

- Dave Rimington Trophy (center): Ryan Kelly, Alabama
- Jim Parker Trophy (offensive lineman): Landon Turner, North Carolina
- Joe Moore Award (offensive line): Alabama

=== Defense ===
- Bronko Nagurski Trophy (defensive player): Tyler Matakevich, Temple
- Chuck Bednarik Award (defensive player): Tyler Matakevich, Temple
- Lott Trophy (defensive impact): Carl Nassib, Penn State

Defensive line

- Bill Willis Award (defensive lineman): Myles Garrett, Texas A&M
- Dick Butkus Award (linebacker): Jaylon Smith, Notre Dame
- Jack Lambert Trophy (linebacker): Joe Schobert, Wisconsin
- Lombardi Award (defensive lineman/linebacker): Carl Nassib, Penn State
- Ted Hendricks Award (defensive end): Carl Nassib, Penn State

Defensive back

- Jim Thorpe Award (defensive back): Desmond King, Iowa
- Jack Tatum Trophy (defensive back): Desmond King, Iowa

=== Special teams ===
- Lou Groza Award (placekicker): Kaʻimi Fairbairn, UCLA
- Vlade Award (placekicker): Aidan Schneider, Oregon
- Ray Guy Award (punter): Tom Hackett, Utah
- Jet Award (return specialist): Christian McCaffrey, Stanford
- Peter Mortell Award (holder): Peter Mortell, Minnesota

=== Other positional awards ===
- Outland Trophy (interior lineman on either offense or defense): Joshua Garnett, Stanford

=== Coaches ===
- AFCA Coach of the Year: Dabo Swinney, Clemson
- AP Coach of the Year: Dabo Swinney, Clemson
- Bobby Dodd Coach of the Year Award: Kirk Ferentz, Iowa
- Eddie Robinson Coach of the Year: Kirk Ferentz, Iowa
- Paul "Bear" Bryant Award: Dabo Swinney, Clemson
- SN Coach of the Year: Dabo Swinney, Clemson
- The Home Depot Coach of the Year Award: Dabo Swinney, Clemson
- Woody Hayes Trophy: Kirk Ferentz, Iowa
- Walter Camp Coach of the Year: Dabo Swinney, Clemson

==== Assistants ====
- AFCA Assistant Coach of the Year: Don Brown, Boston College
- Broyles Award: Lincoln Riley, Oklahoma

== Coaching changes ==
This is restricted to coaching changes taking place on or after May 1, 2015. For coaching changes that occurred earlier in 2015, see 2014 NCAA Division I FBS end-of-season coaching changes.

Team	Outgoing coach	Date	Reason	Replacement
Ball State	Pete Lembo	December 22, 2015	Took job as special teams coordinator at Maryland	Mike Neu
Bowling Green	Dino Babers	December 5, 2015	Left for Syracuse	Mike Jinks
BYU	Bronco Mendenhall	December 4, 2015	Left for Virginia	Kalani Sitake
East Carolina	Ruffin McNeill	December 4, 2015	Fired	Scottie Montgomery
Georgia	Mark Richt	November 29, 2015	Fired	Kirby Smart
Georgia Southern	Willie Fritz	December 11, 2015	Left for Tulane	Dell McGee (interim)
Georgia Southern	Dell McGee (interim)	December 20, 2015	Permanent replacement	Tyson Summers
Hawaii	Norm Chow	November 1, 2015	Fired	Chris Naeole
Hawaii	Chris Naeole	November 27, 2015	Permanent replacement	Nick Rolovich
Illinois	Tim Beckman	August 28, 2015	Fired	Bill Cubit
Illinois	Bill Cubit	March 5, 2016	Fired	Lovie Smith
Iowa State	Paul Rhoads	November 22, 2015	Fired after the season	Matt Campbell
Louisiana–Monroe	Todd Berry	November 14, 2015	Fired	John Mumford (interim)
Louisiana–Monroe	John Mumford (interim)	December 14, 2015	Permanent replacement	Matt Viator
Maryland	Randy Edsall	October 11, 2015	Fired	Mike Locksley (interim)
Maryland	Mike Locksley (interim)	December 2, 2015	Permanent replacement	D. J. Durkin
Memphis	Justin Fuente	November 28, 2015	Left for Virginia Tech	Mike Norvell
Miami	Al Golden	October 25, 2015	Fired	Larry Scott (interim)
Miami	Larry Scott (interim)	December 2, 2015	Permanent replacement	Mark Richt
Minnesota	Jerry Kill	October 28, 2015	Retired (health)	Tracy Claeys
Missouri	Gary Pinkel	November 13, 2015	Resigned after the season (health)	Barry Odom
North Texas	Dan McCarney	October 10, 2015	Fired	Mike Canales (interim)
North Texas	Mike Canales (interim)	December 5, 2015	Permanent replacement	Seth Littrell
Rutgers	Kyle Flood	November 29, 2015	Fired	Chris Ash
Southern Mississippi	Todd Monken	January 24, 2016	Left for the Tampa Bay Buccaneers as offensive coordinator	Jay Hopson
South Carolina	Steve Spurrier	October 12, 2015	Retired	Shawn Elliott (interim)
South Carolina	Shawn Elliott (interim)	December 6, 2015	Permanent replacement	Will Muschamp
Syracuse	Scott Shafer	November 23, 2015	Fired after the season	Dino Babers
Texas State	Dennis Franchione	December 22, 2015	Retired	Everett Withers
Toledo	Matt Campbell	November 29, 2015	Left for Iowa State	Jason Candle
Tulane	Curtis Johnson	November 28, 2015	Fired	Willie Fritz
UCF	George O'Leary	October 25, 2015	Resigned/retired	Danny Barrett (interim)
UCF	Danny Barrett (interim)	December 1, 2015	Permanent replacement	Scott Frost
USC	Steve Sarkisian	October 12, 2015	Fired	Clay Helton
UTSA	Larry Coker	January 5, 2016	Resigned	Frank Wilson
Virginia	Mike London	November 29, 2015	Resigned	Bronco Mendenhall
Virginia Tech	Frank Beamer	November 1, 2015	Retired after the season	Justin Fuente

== Television viewers and ratings ==
=== Most watched regular season games ===
All times Eastern. Rankings are from the AP Poll before (11/3) and the CFP Rankings thereafter.

Rank	Date	Matchup				Channel	Viewers (millions)	TV Rating	Significance
1	November 7, 8:00pm	No. 2 LSU	16	No. 4 Alabama	30	CBS	11.06	6.4	College GameDay/Rivalry
2	November 21, 3:30pm	No. 9 Michigan State	17	No. 3 Ohio State	14	ABC	11.05	6.6	College GameDay
3	November 28, 12:00pm	No. 8 Ohio State	42	No. 10 Michigan	13	ABC	10.83	6.4	Rivalry
4	September 7, 8:00pm	No. 1 Ohio State	42	Virginia Tech	24	ESPN	10.59	6.0	
5	November 28, 3:30pm	No. 2 Alabama	29	Auburn	13	CBS	9.29	5.3	Rivalry
6	September 5, 8:00pm	No. 20 Wisconsin	17	No. 3 Alabama	35	ABC	7.97	4.3	Advocare Classic/College GameDay
7	September 12, 8:00pm	No. 7 Oregon	28	No. 5 Michigan State	31	ABC	7.90	4.8	College GameDay
8	October 3, 8:00pm	No. 6 Notre Dame	22	No. 12 Clemson	24	ABC	7.65	4.5	College GameDay
9	September 19, 9:00pm	No. 15 Ole Miss	43	No. 2 Alabama	37	ESPN	7.61	4.6	College GameDay/Rivalry
10	November 7, 3:30pm	No. 16 Florida State	13	No. 1 Clemson	23	ABC	7.56	4.7	Rivalry

=== Conference championship games ===
All times Eastern. Rankings are from the CFP Rankings.

Rank	Date	Matchup				Channel	Viewers (millions)	TV Rating	Conference	Location
1	December 5, 4:00pm	No. 18 Florida	15	No. 2 Alabama	29	CBS	12.8	7.8	SEC	Georgia Dome, Atlanta
2	December 5, 8:19pm	No. 5 Michigan State	16	No. 4 Iowa	13	FOX	9.8	5.7	Big Ten	Lucas Oil Stadium, Indianapolis
3	December 5, 8:00pm	No. 1 Clemson	45	No. 10 North Carolina	37	ABC	7.9	4.1	ACC	Bank of America Stadium, Charlotte, North Carolina
4	December 5, 7:45pm	No. 20 USC	22	No. 7 Stanford	41	ESPN	2.6	1.6	Pac-12	Levi's Stadium, Santa Clara, California
5	December 5, 12:00pm	No. 22 Temple	13	No. 19 Houston	24	ABC	2.5	1.8	AAC	TDECU Stadium, Houston
6	December 4, 7:27pm	Bowling Green	34	Northern Illinois	14	ESPN2	1.0	0.7	MAC	Ford Field, Detroit
7	December 5, 12:00pm	Southern Miss	28	Western Kentucky	45	ESPN2	0.488	N/A	C-USA	Houchens Industries-L. T. Smith Stadium, Bowling Green, Kentucky
8	December 5, 10:00pm	Air Force	24	San Diego State	27	ESPN2	0.363	N/A	MWC	Qualcomm Stadium, San Diego

=== College Football Playoff ===
All times Eastern. Rankings are from the CFP Rankings.

Game	Date		Matchup				Channel	Viewers (millions)	TV Rating
Orange Bowl	December 31, 2015	4:00pm	No. 4 Oklahoma	17	No. 1 Clemson	37	ESPN	15.64	9.1
Cotton Bowl	December 31, 2015	8:00pm	No. 3 Michigan State	0	No. 2 Alabama	38	ESPN	18.55	9.6
National Championship	January 11, 2016	8:30pm	No. 2 Alabama	45	No. 1 Clemson	40	ESPN	26.18^	15.0

^ESPN Megacast

== Attendances ==
Average home attendance top 30:

Rank	Team	G	Total	Average
1	Michigan Wolverines	7	771,174	110,168
2	Ohio State Buckeyes	7	750,705	107,244
3	Texas A&M Aggies	7	725,354	103,622
4	LSU Tigers	6	612,026	102,004
5	Alabama Crimson Tide	7	707,786	101,112
6	Tennessee Volunteers	7	704,088	100,584
7	Penn State Nittany Lions	7	698,590	99,799
8	Georgia Bulldogs	7	649,222	92,746
9	Florida Gators	7	630,457	90,065
10	Texas Longhorns	6	540,210	90,035
11	Nebraska Cornhuskers	7	629,983	89,998
12	Auburn Tigers	7	612,157	87,451
13	Oklahoma Sooners	6	512,139	85,357
14	Clemson Tigers	7	588,266	84,038
15	Notre Dame Fighting Irish	6	484,770	80,795
16	South Carolina Gamecocks	6	472,934	78,822
17	Wisconsin Badgers	7	546,099	78,014
18	USC Trojans	7	527,506	75,358
19	Michigan State Spartans	7	522,628	74,661
20	Florida State Seminoles	7	512,534	73,219
21	Arkansas Razorbacks	7	471,279	67,326
22	UCLA Bruins	6	401,149	66,858
23	Missouri Tigers	6	390,720	65,120
24	Iowa Hawkeyes	7	441,992	63,142
25	Washington Huskies	7	433,432	61,919
26	Mississippi State Bulldogs	7	432,490	61,784
27	Kentucky Wildcats	8	490,361	61,295
28	Virginia Tech Hokies	6	364,942	60,824
29	Ole Miss Rebels	7	423,355	60,479
30	BYU Cougars	6	351,191	58,532
