= 2015 Mid-American Conference football season =

- League: NCAA Division I FBS
- Sport: Football
- Duration: September 2015 – December 2015
- Teams: 13

Regular season
- Season MVP: Matt Johnson
- Eastern Division champions: Bowling Green Falcons
- Eastern Division runners-up: Ohio Bobcats
- Western Division champions: Northern Illinois Huskies
- Western Division runners-up: Toledo Rockets

MAC Championship Game
- Champions: Bowling Green Falcons

Football seasons
- 2014 2016

2015 Mid-American Conference football standings
	Conf.			Overall
Team	W		L	W		L
East Division
Bowling Green x$	7	–	1	10	–	4
Ohio	5	–	3	8	–	5
Akron	5	–	3	8	–	5
Buffalo	3	–	5	5	–	7
Kent State	2	–	6	3	–	9
Miami (OH)	2	–	6	3	–	9
UMass	2	–	6	3	–	9
West Division
Northern Illinois xy	6	–	2	8	–	6
Western Michigan x	6	–	2	8	–	5
Toledo x	6	–	2	10	–	2
Central Michigan x	6	–	2	7	–	6
Ball State	2	–	6	3	–	9
Eastern Michigan	0	–	8	1	–	11
Championship: Bowling Green 34, Northern Illinois 14
$ – Conference champion; x – Division champion/co-champions; y – Championship game participant

The 2015 Mid-American Conference football season is the 70th season of college football play for the Mid-American Conference (MAC) and is part of the 2015 NCAA Division I FBS football season

== 2015 MAC Specialty Award Winners ==
Coach of the Year: Matt Campbell, Toledo
Freshman of the Year: RB Jamauri Bogan, Western Michigan
Offensive Player of the Year: QB Matt Johnson, Bowling Green
Defensive Player of the Year: LB Jatavis Brown, Akron
Special Teams Player of the Year: KR Aregeros Turner, Northern Illinois
Vern Smith Leadership Award Winner: QB Matt Johnson, Bowling Green

== All-Conference teams ==
2015 All-MAC First Team Offense
Quarterback – Matt Johnson, Bowling Green
Offensive Linemen – Storm Norton, Toledo
Offensive Linemen – Andrew Ness, Northern Illinois
Offensive Lineman – Willie Beavers, Western Michigan
Offensive Linemen – Nick Beamish, Central Michigan
Offensive Linemen – Aidan Conlon, Northern Illinois
Tight End – Matt Weiser, Buffalo
Wide Receiver – Roger Lewis, Bowling Green
Wide Receiver – Corey Davis, Western Michigan
Wide Receiver – Tajae Sharpe, UMass
Wide Receiver – Daniel Braverman, Western Michigan
Running Back – Joel Bouagnon, Northern Illinois
Running Back – Travis Greene, Bowling Green
Placekicker – Christian Hagan, Northern Illinois

2015 All-MAC First Team Defense
Outside Linebacker – Jatavis Brown, Akron
Outside Linebacker – Sean Wiggins, Ball State
Inside Linebacker – Boomer Mays, Northern Illinois
Inside Linebacker – Austin Valdez, Bowling Green
Down Lineman – Orion Jones, Toledo
Down Lineman – Perez Ford, Northern Illinois
Down Lineman – Joshua Posley, Ball State
Down Lineman – Terence Waugh, Kent State
Defensive Back – Shawun Lurry, Northern Illinois
Defensive Back – Nate Holley, Kent State
Defensive Back – Cheatham Norrils, Toledo
Defensive Back – Demetrius Monday, Kent State
Punter – Joe Davidson, Bowling Green

2015 All-MAC First Team Specialists
Kickoff Return Specialist – Aregeros Turner, Northern Illinois
Punt Return Specialist – Corey Jones, Toledo

2015 All-MAC Second Team Offense
Quarterback – Cooper Rush, Central Michigan
Offensive Lineman – Alex Huettel, Bowling Green
Offensive Lineman – Jacob Richard, Ball State
Offensive Lineman – Levon Myers, Northern Illinois
Offensive Lineman – Jacob Bennett, Bowling Green
Offensive Lineman – John Kling, Buffalo
Tight End – Ben McCord, Central Michigan
Wide Receiver – Jordan Williams-Lambert, Ball State
Wide Receiver – Kenny Golladay, Northern Illinois
Wide Receiver – Gehrig Dieter, Bowling Green
Wide Receiver – Alonzo Russell, Toledo
Running Back – Kareem Hunt, Toledo
Running Back – Terry Swanson, Toledo
Placekicker – Brian Eavey, Central Michigan

2015 All-MAC Second Team Defense
Outside Linebacker – Trent Greene, Bowling Green
Outside Linebacker – Brandon Berry, Buffalo
Inside Linebacker – Great Ibe, Eastern Michigan
Inside Linebacker – Jovan Santos-Knox, UMass
Down Lineman – Allen Covington, Toledo
Down Lineman – Blake Serpa, Central Michigan
Down Lineman – Bryson Albright, Miami
Down Lineman – Cody Grice, Akron
Defensive Back – Darius Phillips, Western Michigan
Defensive Back – Kavon Frazier, Central Michigan
Defensive Back – Ian Wells, Ohio
Defensive Back – Ronald Zamort, Western Michigan
Punter – Anthony Melchiori, Kent State

2015 All-MAC Second Team Specialists
Kickoff Return Specialist – Darius Phillips, Western Michigan
Punt Return Specialist – Trey Dudley-Giles, UMass

2015 All-MAC Third Team Offense
Quarterback – Zach Terrell, Western Michigan
Offensive Lineman – Taylor Moton, Western Michigan
Offensive Lineman – Ramadan Ahmeti, Central Michigan
Offensive Lineman – Mike McQueen, Ohio
Offensive Lineman – Lucas Powell, Ohio
Offensive Lineman – Isaiah Williams, Akron
Tight End – Rodney Mills, UMass
Wide Receiver – Jesse Kroll, Central Michigan
Wide Receiver – Ronnie Moore, Bowling Green
Wide Receiver – Sebastian Smith, Ohio
Wide Receiver – KeVonn Mabon, Ball State
Running Back – Jamauri Bogan, Western Michigan
Running Back – Darius Jackson, Eastern Michigan
Placekicker – Andrew Haldeman, Western Michigan

2015 All-MAC Third Team Defense
Outside Linebacker – Okezie Alozie, Buffalo
Outside Linebacker – Trey Seals, UMass
Inside Linebacker – Matt Dellinger, Kent State
Inside Linebacker – Quentin Poling, Ohio
Down Lineman – Jamal Marcus, Akron
Down Lineman – Rodney Coe, Akron
Down Lineman – JT Jones, Miami
Down Lineman – Trent Voss, Toledo
Defensive Back – Asantay Brown, Western Michigan
Defensive Back – Marlon Moore, Northern Illinois
Defensive Back – Boise Ross, Buffalo
Defensive Back – DeJuan Rogers, Toledo
Punter – Logan Laurent, UMass

2015 All-MAC Third Team Specialists
Kickoff Return Specialist – KeVonn Mabon, Ball State
Punt Return Specialist – Ryan Burbrink, Bowling Green

== Bowl games ==
Seven MAC programs received invitations to bowl games for the 2015 season. This matches the MAC's record number of bowl invitations in a single season, a record which was established in the 2012 bowl season.

NOTE: All times are local

Bowl	Date	Time	MAC team (Record)	Opponent (Record)	Site	TV	Result	Attendance
2015 Camellia Bowl	Dec 19	5:30 p.m.	Ohio (8–4)	Appalachian St. (10–2)	Cramton Bowl • Montgomery, AL	ESPN	L 29–31	21,395
2015 Famous Idaho Potato Bowl	Dec 22	3:30 p.m.	Akron (7–5)	Utah State (6–6)	Albertsons Stadium • Boise, ID	ESPN	W 23–21	18,876
2015 Boca Raton Bowl	Dec 22	7:00 p.m.	Toledo (9–2)	#24 Temple (10–3)	FAU Stadium • Boca Raton, FL	ESPN	W 32–17	25,908
2015 Poinsettia Bowl	Dec 23	4:30 p.m.	Northern Illinois (8–5)	Boise State (8–4)	Qualcomm Stadium • San Diego, CA	ESPN	L 7–55	21,501
2015 GoDaddy Bowl	Dec 23	8:00 p.m.	Bowling Green (10–3)	Georgia Southern (8–4)	Ladd–Peebles Stadium • Mobile, AL	ESPN	L 27–58	28,656
2015 Bahamas Bowl	Dec 24	Noon	Western Michigan (7–5)	Middle Tennessee (7–5)	Thomas Robinson Stadium • Nassau, Bahamas	ESPN	W 45–31	13,123
2015 Quick Lane Bowl	Dec 28	5:00 p.m.	Central Michigan (7–5)	Minnesota (5–7)	Ford Field • Detroit, MI	ESPN2	L 14–21	34,217
