= 2015 Buffalo Bulls football team =

American college football season

2015 Buffalo Bulls football
- Conference: Mid-American Conference
- East Division
- Record: 5–7 (3–5 MAC)
- Head coach: Lance Leipold (1st season)
- Offensive coordinator: Andy Kotelnicki (1st season)
- Offensive scheme: Multiple pro-style
- Defensive coordinator: Brian Borland (1st season)
- Base defense: 4–3
- Captains: Okezie Alozie; Joe Licata
- Home stadium: University at Buffalo Stadium

2015 Mid-American Conference football standings
	Conf.			Overall
Team	W		L	W		L
East Division
Bowling Green x$	7	–	1	10	–	4
Ohio	5	–	3	8	–	5
Akron	5	–	3	8	–	5
Buffalo	3	–	5	5	–	7
Kent State	2	–	6	3	–	9
Miami (OH)	2	–	6	3	–	9
UMass	2	–	6	3	–	9
West Division
Northern Illinois xy	6	–	2	8	–	6
Western Michigan x	6	–	2	8	–	5
Toledo x	6	–	2	10	–	2
Central Michigan x	6	–	2	7	–	6
Ball State	2	–	6	3	–	9
Eastern Michigan	0	–	8	1	–	11
Championship: Bowling Green 34, Northern Illinois 14
$ – Conference champion; x – Division champion/co-champions; y – Championship game participant

The 2015 Buffalo Bulls football team represented the University at Buffalo as a member of the Mid-American Conference (MAC) during the 2015 NCAA Division I FBS football season. Led by first-year head coach Lance Leipold, the Bulls compiled an overall record of 5–7 with a mark of 3–5 in conference play, placing fourth in the MAC's East Division. The team played home games at University at Buffalo Stadium in Amherst, New York.

== Schedule ==
Date	Time	Opponent	Site	TV	Result	Attendance
September 5	3:30 pm	Albany*	University at Buffalo Stadium; Amherst, NY	ESPN3	W 51–14	20,872
September 12	12:00 pm	at Penn State*	Beaver Stadium; University Park, PA	ESPN2	L 14–27	93,065
September 19	12:00 pm	at Florida Atlantic*	FAU Stadium; Boca Raton, FL	ASN	W 33–15	15,397
September 26	3:30 pm	Nevada*	University at Buffalo Stadium; Amherst, NY	ESPN3	L 21–24	19,072
October 3	3:30 pm	Bowling Green^{†}	University at Buffalo Stadium; Amherst, NY	TWCS, ESPN3	L 22–28	20,843
October 17	1:00 pm	at Central Michigan	Kelly/Shorts Stadium; Mount Pleasant, MI	ESPN3	L 14–51	14,301
October 24	3:30 pm	Ohio	University at Buffalo Stadium; Amherst, NY	ASN/ESPN3	W 41–17	17,128
October 29	7:30 pm	at Miami (OH)	Yager Stadium; Oxford, OH	ESPN3	W 29–24	12,697
November 5	7:00 pm	at Kent State	Dix Stadium; Kent, OH	ESPN3	W 18–17	10,379
November 11	8:00 pm	Northern Illinois	University at Buffalo Stadium; Amherst, NY	ESPNU	L 30–41	14,260
November 21	3:30 pm	at Akron	InfoCision Stadium–Summa Field; Akron, OH	CBSSN	L 21–42	15,727
November 27	4:30 pm	UMass	University at Buffalo Stadium; Amherst, NY (rivalry)	ESPNU	L 26–31	15,648
*Non-conference game; ^{†}Homecoming; All times are in Eastern time

== Game summaries ==
=== Albany ===
Week One: Albany Great Danes at Buffalo Bulls – Game summary

Quarter	1	2	3	4	Total
Great Danes	7	0	0	7	14
Bulls	7	17	14	13	51

at UB Stadium, Amherst, NY

- Date: September 5
- Game time: 3:30 p.m. EDT
- Game weather: Weather: Partly Cloudy • Temperature: 80 • Wind: SW 5-10
- Game attendance: 20,872
- Referee: Tom Stapleton
- TV: ESPN3
- Final Stats

Game information

First quarter

- UA – Josh Gontarek 4-yard pass from DJ Crook (Patrick Toole kick), 6:27. Great Danes 7–0. Drive: 14 plays, 82 yards, 6:54.
- UB – Marcus McGill 9-yard pass from Joe Licata (Adam Mitcheson kick), 3:29. Tied 7–7. Drive: 8 plays, 60 yards, 2:49.

Second quarter

- UB – Adam Mitcheson 40-yard field goal, 14:30. Bulls 10–7. Drive: 7 plays, 39 yards, 2:26.
- UB – Anthone Taylor 21-yard run (Adam Mitcheson kick), 7:19. Bulls 17–7. Drive: 13 plays, 89 yards, 4:45.
- UB – Jordan Johnson 1-yard run (Adam Mitcheson kick), 2:28. Bulls 24–7. Drive: 10 plays, 77 yards, 3:15.

Third quarter

- UB – Anthone Taylor 1-yard run (Adam Mitcheson kick), 13:16. Bulls 31–7. Drive: 3 plays, 22 yards, 0:54.
- UB – Jacob Martinez 20-yard pass from Joe Licata (Adam Mitcheson kick), 9:08. Bulls 38–7. Drive: 5 plays, 80 yards, 2:32.

Fourth quarter

- UA – Elijah Ibitokun-Hanks 1-yard run (Patrick Toole kick), 11:48. Bulls 38–14. Drive: 12 plays, 89 yards, 5:47.
- UB – Tony Daniel 1-yard run (Adam Mitcheson kick blocked), 4:01. Bulls 44–14. Drive: 10 plays, 46 yards, 6:00.
- UB – Jacob Martinez 86-yard punt return for TD (Adam Mitcheson kick), 1:32. Bulls 51–14.

Leading Passers

- UA – DJ Crook 11/22 Comp/Att 104 Yds, 1 TD, 2 INT
- UB – Joe Licata 20/26 Comp/Att 246 Yds, 2 TD

Leading Rushers

- UA – Elijah Ibitokun-Hanks 11 Rushes 74 Yds. 6.7 Avg 20 Lng.
- UB – Anthone Taylor 17 Rushes 104 Yds. 6.1 Avg 21 Lng.

Leading Receivers

- UA – Josh Gontarek 5 Rec. 66 Yds. 13.2 Avg 30 Lng.
- UB – Mason Schreck 5 Rec. 62 Yds. 12.4 Avg 18 Lng.

Leading Tacklers

- UA – Colin Cooper 5 Tack 6 Ast
- UB – Okezie Alozie 5 Tack 2 Ast

In their first game of the season, the Bulls won, 51–14 over the Albany Great Danes.

=== @ Penn State ===
Week Two: Buffalo Bulls at Penn State Nittany Lions – Game summary

Quarter	1	2	3	4	Total
Bulls	0	0	7	7	14
Nittany Lions	0	10	3	14	27

at Beaver Stadium, University Park, PA

- Date: September 12
- Game time: 12:00 p.m. EDT
- Game weather: Weather: Rainy • Temperature: 61-64 • Wind: SE 4-6
- Game attendance: 93,065
- Referee: D. Willard
- TV announcers (ESPN2): Beth Mowins, Anthony Becht & Paul Carcaterra
- Final Stats

Game information

First quarter

- No Scoring

Second quarter

- PSU – Brandon Polk 22-yard run (Joey Julius kick), 6:57. Nittany Lions 7–0. Drive: 2 plays, 24 yards, 0:37.
- PSU – Joey Julius 22-yard field goal, 3:58. Nittany Lions 10–0. Drive: 4 plays, 7 yards, 1:54.

Third quarter

- UB – Ron Willoughby 14-yard pass from Joe Licata (Adam Mitcheson kick), 5:33. Nittany Lions 10–7. Drive: 11 plays, 78 yards, 4:48.
- PSU – Joey Julius 21-yard field goal, 0:20. Nittany Lions 13–7. Drive: 12 plays, 51 yards, 5:07.

Fourth quarter

- PSU – DaeSean Hamilton 5-yard pass from Christian Hackenberg (Joey Julius kick), 12:04. Nittany Lions 20–7. Drive: 4 plays, 62 yards, 1:25.
- PSU – Saquon Barkley 9-yard run (Joey Julius kick), 9:02. Nittany Lions 27–7. Drive: 6 plays, 74 yards, 1:54.
- UB – Marcus McGill 10-yard pass from Joe Licata (Adam Mitcheson kick), 4:38. Nittany Lions 27–14. Drive: 13 plays, 82 yards, 4:18.

Leading Passers

- UB – Joe Licata 24/35 Comp/Att 205 Yds, 2 TD, 1 INT
- PSU – Christian Hackenberg 14/27 Comp/Att 128 Yds, 1 TD

Leading Rushers

- UB – Anthone Taylor 18 Rushes 93 Yds. 5.2 Avg 29 Lng.
- PSU – Saquon Barkley 12 Rushes 115 Yds. 9.6 Avg 33 Lng.

Leading Receivers

- UB – Ron Willoughby 8 Rec. 80 Yds. 10.0 Avg 21 Lng.
- PSU – Chris Godwin 5 Rec. 75 Yds. 15.0 Avg 38 Lng.

Leading Tacklers

- UB – Okezie Alozie 3 Tack 4 Ast
- PSU – Austin Johnson 4 Tack 5 Ast

In their second game of the season, the Bulls lost, 27–14 to the Penn State Nittany Lions.

=== @ Florida Atlantic ===
Week Three: Buffalo Bulls at Florida Atlantic Owls – Game summary

Quarter	1	2	3	4	Total
Bulls	0	7	19	7	33
Owls	2	7	0	6	15

at FAU Stadium, Boca Raton, FL

- Date: September 19
- Game time: 12:00 p.m. EDT
- Game weather: Weather: Sunny • Temperature: 90 • Wind: @10 E
- Game attendance: 15,397
- Referee: Joe Pester
- TV announcers (ASN): Mike Gleason & Doug Chapman
- Final Stats

Game information

First quarter

- FAU – Team safety, Joe Licata called for intentional grounding in the endzone, 8:19. Owls 2–0.

Second quarter

- FAU – Nate Terry 6-yard pass from Jason Driskel (Greg Joseph kick), 13:31. Owls 9–0. Drive: 5 plays, 33 yards, 1:20.
- UB – Travis Pitzonka 60-yard fumble return (Adam Mitcheson kick), 1:11. Owls 9–7.

Third quarter

- UB – Adam Mitcheson 19-yard field goal, 8:47. Bulls 10–9. Drive: 4 plays, 8 yards, 2:04.
- UB – Boise Ross 39-yard interception return (Adam Mitcheson kick), 8:30. Bulls 17–9.
- UB – Team safety, Greg Howell tackled in the endzone, 4:40. Bulls 19–9.
- UB – Jordan Johnson 19-yard run (Adam Mitcheson kick), 2:54. Bulls 26–9. Drive: 4 plays, 68 yards, 1:46.

Fourth quarter

- FAU – Kamrin Solomon 54-yard pass from Jason Driskel (2-point pass failed), 14:50. Bulls 26–15. Drive: 2 plays, 62 yards, 0:12.
- UB – Brandon Crawford 11-yard fumble return (Adam Mitcheson kick), 5:40. Bulls 33–15.

Leading Passers

- UB – Joe Licata 10/20 Comp/Att 105 Yds, 0 TD, 1 INT
- FAU – Jason Driskel 26/55 Comp/Att 385 Yds, 2 TD, 1 INT

Leading Rushers

- UB – Anthone Taylor 25 Rushes 116 Yds. 4.6 Avg 10 Lng.
- FAU – Greg Howell 14 Rushes 75 Yds. 5.4 Avg 13 Lng.

Leading Receivers

- UB – Malcolm Robinson 1 Rec. 43 Yds. 43 Avg 43 Lng.
- FAU – Jenson Stoshak 7 Rec. 124 Yds. 17.7 Avg 44 Lng.

Leading Tacklers

- UB – Brandon Berry 6 Tack 4 Ast
- FAU – Azeez Al-Shaair 6 Tack 5 Ast

In their third game of the season, the Bulls won, 33–15 over the Florida Atlantic Owls.

=== Nevada ===
Week Four: Nevada Wolf Pack at Buffalo Bulls – Game summary

Quarter	1	2	3	4	Total
Wolf Pack	14	3	0	7	24
Bulls	7	3	3	8	21

at UB Stadium, Amherst, NY

- Date: September 26
- Game time: 3:30 p.m. EDT
- Game weather: Weather: Mostly Cloudy • Temperature: 72 • Wind: 11 ENE
- Game attendance: 19,072
- Referee: Greg Sujack
- TV announcers (ESPN3): Doug Sherman & Josh Cribbs
- Final Stats

Game information

First quarter

- UB – Matt Weiser 41-yard pass from Joe Licata (Adam Mitcheson kick), 11:11. Bulls 7–0. Drive: 5 plays, 69 yards, 1:53.
- UNR – James Butler 5-yard run (Brent Zuzo kick), 3:07. Tied 7–7. Drive: 2 plays, 96 yards, 0:40.
- UNR – Don Jackson 55-yard run (Brent Zuzo kick), 0:12. Wolf Pack 14–7. Drive: 4 plays, 62 yards, 1:54.

Second quarter

- UB – Adam Mitcheson 33-yard field goal, 11:11. Wolf Pack 14–10. Drive: 11 plays, 59 yards, 4:01.
- UNR – Brent Zuzo 38-yard field goal, 8:41. Wolf Pack 17–10. Drive: 9 plays, 54 yards, 2:30.

Third quarter

- UB – Adam Mitcheson 43-yard field goal, 6:56. Wolf Pack 17–13. Drive: 8 plays, 37 yards, 3:43.

Fourth quarter

- UNR – Don Jackson 10-yard run (Brent Zuzo kick), 10:25. Wolf Pack 24–13. Drive: 12 plays, 80 yards, 5:27.
- UB – Collin Lisa 5-yard pass from Joe Licata (2-point run good), 8:06. Wolf Pack 24–21. Drive: 8 plays, 75 yards, 2:19.

Leading Passers

- UNR – Tyler Stewart 12/21 Comp/Att 90 Yds, 0 TD
- UB – Joe Licata 28/46 Comp/Att 338 Yds, 2 TD, 2 INT

Leading Rushers

- UNR – James Butler 16 Rushes 177 Yds. 11.1 Avg 91 Lng.
- UB – Jordan Johnson 13 Rushes 79 Yds. 6.1 Avg 37 Lng.

Leading Receivers

- UNR – Hasaan Henderson 2 Rec. 28 Yds. 14 Avg 20 Lng.
- UB – Matt Weiser 10 Rec. 131 Yds. 13.1 Avg 41 Lng.

Leading Tacklers

- UNR – Matthew Lyons 9 Tack 7 Ast
- UB – Brandon Berry 7 Tack 6 Ast

In their fourth game of the season, the Bulls lost, 24–21 to the Nevada Wolf Pack.

=== Bowling Green ===
Week Five: Bowling Green Falcons at Buffalo Bulls – Game summary

Quarter	1	2	3	4	Total
Falcons	7	14	0	7	28
Bulls	3	3	3	13	22

at UB Stadium, Amherst, NY

- Date: October 3
- Game time: 3:30 p.m. EDT
- Game weather: Weather: Showers, Windy • Temperature: 47 • Wind: 22 ENE
- Game attendance: 20,843
- Referee: Curt Johnson
- TV announcers (TWCS/ESPN3): Mike Cairns, Frank Stams & Ben Wagner
- Final Stats

Game information

First quarter

- BGSU – Donovan Wilson 1-yard run (Tyler Tate kick), 10:36. Falcons 7–0. Drive: 11 plays, 85 yards, 4:24.
- UB – Adam Mitcheson 30-yard field goal, 5:32. Falcons 7–3. Drive: 12 plays, 53 yards, 5:04.

Second quarter

- BGSU – Matt Johnson 10-yard run (Tyler Tate kick), 11:08. Falcons 14–3. Drive: 3 plays, 72 yards, 0:42.
- BGSU – Roger Lewis 12-yard pass from Matt Johnson (Tyler Tate kick), 7:54. Falcons 21–3. Drive: 6 plays, 72 yards, 1:05.
- UB – Adam Mitcheson 28-yard field goal, 0:22. Falcons 21–6. Drive: 15 plays, 79 yards, 2:00.

Third quarter

- UB – Adam Mitcheson 27-yard field goal, 2:41. Falcons 21–9. Drive: 16 plays, 78 yards, 5:35.

Fourth quarter

- BGSU – Ronnie Moore 7-yard run (Tyler Tate kick), 14:54. Falcons 28–9. Drive: 10 plays, 94 yards, 2:42.
- UB – Jordan Johnson 1-yard run (Adam Mitcheson kick), 8:42. Falcons 28–16. Drive: 16 plays, 92 yards, 6:05.
- UB – Ron Willoughby 5-yard pass from Joe Licata (Adam Mitcheson kick failed), 5:13. Falcons 28–22. Drive: 7 plays, 62 yards, 1:16.

Leading Passers

- BGSU – Matt Johnson 23/29 Comp/Att 324 Yds, 1 TD
- UB – Joe Licata 35/59 Comp/Att 348 Yds, 1 TD, 1 INT

Leading Rushers

- BGSU – Travis Greene 17 Rushes 119 Yds. 7.0 Avg 29 Lng.
- UB – Anthone Taylor 21 Rushes 93 Yds. 4.4 Avg 12 Lng.

Leading Receivers

- BGSU – Roger Lewis 10 Rec. 201 Yds. 20.1 Avg 61 Lng.
- UB – Matt Weiser 8 Rec. 90 Yds. 11.3 Avg 18 Lng.

Leading Tacklers

- BGSU – James Sanford 10 Tack 3 Ast
- UB – Nick Gilbo 8 Tack 4 Ast

In their fifth game of the season, the Bulls lost, 28–22 to the Bowling Green Falcons.

=== @ Central Michigan ===
Week Seven: Buffalo Bulls at Central Michigan Chippewas – Game summary

Quarter	1	2	3	4	Total
Bulls	7	0	0	7	14
Chippewas	14	23	7	7	51

at Kelly/Shorts Stadium, Mount Pleasant, MI

- Date: October 17
- Game time: 1:00 p.m. EDT
- Game weather: Weather: Partly cloudy • Temperature: 46 • Wind: 10-15 NW
- Game attendance: 14,301
- Referee: A. Cannella
- TV: ESPN3
- Final Stats

Game information

First quarter

- CMU – Martez Walker 6-yard run (Brian Eavey kick), 11:56. Chippewas 7–0. Drive: 7 plays, 78 yards, 3:04.
- UB – Ron Willoughby 34-yard pass from Joe Licata (Adam Mitcheson kick), 6:03. Tied 7–7. Drive: 7 plays, 71 yards, 3:26.
- CMU – Cooper Rush 1-yard run (Brian Eavey kick), 3:05. Chippewas 14–7. Drive: 7 plays, 56 yards, 2:58.

Second quarter

- CMU – Jesse Kroll 46-yard pass from Cooper Rush (Brian Eavey kick), 9:09. Chippewas 21–7. Drive: 7 plays, 76 yards, 3:29.
- CMU – Team safety, blocked punt through the endzone, 7:32. Chippewas 23–7.
- CMU – Trevor Thomas 2-yard pass from Cooper Rush (Brian Eavey kick), 4:23. Chippewas 30–7. Drive: 8 plays, 50 yards, 3:09.
- CMU – Anthony Rice 23-yard pass from Cooper Rush (Brian Eavey kick), 2:54. Chippewas 37–7. Drive: 4 plays, 39 yards, 1:24.

Third quarter

- CMU – Martez Walker 1-yard run (Brian Eavey kick), 4:28. Chippewas 44–7. Drive: 6 plays, 29 yards, 2:32.

Fourth quarter

- UB – Andrew Dadeboe 17-yard interception return (Adam Mitcheson kick), 13:39. Chippewas 44–14.
- CMU – Eric Cooper 19-yard pass from Cooper Rush (Brian Eavey kick), 9:35. Chippewas 51–14. Drive: 9 plays, 75 yards, 4:04.

Leading Passers

- UB – Joe Licata 13/25 Comp/Att 133 Yds, 1 TD, 1 INT
- CMU – Cooper Rush 23/30 Comp/Att 313 Yds, 4 TD, 1 INT

Leading Rushers

- UB – Anthone Taylor 13 Rushes 47 Yds. 3.6 Avg 12 Lng.
- CMU – Martez Walker 20 Rushes 60 Yds. 3.0 Avg 9 Lng.

Leading Receivers

- UB – Ron Willoughby 2 Rec. 53 Yds. 26.5 Avg 34 Lng.
- CMU – Jesse Kroll 7 Rec. 133 Yds. 19.0 Avg 46 Lng.

Leading Tacklers

- UB – Brandon Berry 7 Tack 4 Ast
- CMU – Nathan Ricketts 5 Tack 1 Ast

In their sixth game of the season, the Bulls lost, 51–14 to the Central Michigan Chippewas.

=== Ohio ===
Week Eight: Ohio Bobcats at Buffalo Bulls – Game summary

Quarter	1	2	3	4	Total
Bobcats	7	3	7	0	17
Bulls	14	17	0	10	41

at UB Stadium, Amherst, NY

- Date: October 24
- Game time: 3:30 p.m. EDT
- Game weather: Weather: Showers & Cloudy • Temperature: 55 • Wind: 7 SSW
- Game attendance: 17,128
- Referee: Tim O'Dey
- TV: ASN/ESPN3
- Final Stats

Game information

First quarter

- OU – Daz'mond Patterson 6-yard run (Josiah Yazdani kick), 9:46. Bobcats 7–0. Drive: 12 plays, 75 yards, 5:14.
- UB – Ryan Williamson 15-yard interception return (Adam Mitcheson kick), 8:31. Tied 7–7.
- UB – Jordan Johnson 4-yard run (Adam Mitcheson kick), 2:20. Bulls 14–7. Drive: 7 plays, 60 yards, 2:30.

Second quarter

- OU – Josiah Yazdani 24-yard field goal, 12:44. Bulls 14–10. Drive: 13 plays, 68 yards, 4:36.
- UB – Joe Licata 1-yard run (Adam Mitcheson kick), 7:22. Bulls 21–10. Drive: 11 plays, 85 yards, 5:14.
- UB – Okezie Alozie 22-yard interception return (Adam Mitcheson kick), 3:05. Bulls 28–10.
- UB – Adam Mitcheson 24-yard field goal, 0:00. Bulls 31–10. Drive: 6 plays, 21 yards, 0:36.

Third quarter

- OU – Malek Irons 1-yard run (Josiah Yazdani kick), 3:58. Bulls 31–17. Drive: 10 plays, 81 yards, 2:59.

Fourth quarter

- UB – Adam Mitcheson 35-yard field goal, 13:06. Bulls 34–17. Drive: 12 plays, 57 yards, 5:52.
- UB – Jordan Johnson 39-yard run (Adam Mitcheson kick), 1:58. Bulls 41–17. Drive: 2 plays, 44 yards, 0:54.

Leading Passers

- OU – Derrius Vick 32/51 Comp/Att 323 Yds, 0 TD, 3 INT
- UB – Joe Licata 21/32 Comp/Att 212 Yds, 0 TD

Leading Rushers

- OU – Daz'mond Patterson 11 Rushes 28 Yds. 2.5 Avg 10 Lng.
- UB – Jordan Johnson 28 Rushes 147 Yds. 5.3 Avg 39 Lng.

Leading Receivers

- OU – Keith Heitzman 6 Rec. 83 Yds. 13.8 Avg 22 Lng.
- UB – Marcus McGill 8 Rec. 81 Yds. 10.1 Avg 24 Lng.

Leading Tacklers

- OU – Blair Brown 3 Tack 5 Ast
- UB – Nick Gilbo 10 Tack 5 Ast

In their seventh game of the season, the Bulls won, 41–17 over the Ohio Bobcats.

=== @ Miami (OH) ===
Week Nine: Buffalo Bulls at Miami RedHawks – Game summary

Quarter	1	2	3	4	Total
Bulls	10	7	12	0	29
RedHawks	7	10	0	7	24

at Yager Stadium, Oxford, OH

- Date: October 29
- Game time: 7:30 p.m. EDT
- Game weather: Weather: Clear • Temperature: 46 • Wind: W 9 MPH
- Game attendance: 12,697
- Referee: Greg Sujack
- TV: ESPN3
- Final Stats

Game information

First quarter

- UB – Adam Mitcheson 46-yard field goal, 10:23. Bulls 3–0. Drive: 7 plays, 27 yards, 2:59.
- MU – Brison Burris 76-yard interception return (Kaleb Patterson kick), 5:46. RedHawks 7–3.
- UB – Ron Willoughby 78-yard pass from Joe Licata (Adam Mitcheson kick), 5:29. Bulls 10–7. Drive: 1 plays, 78 yards, 0:17.

Second quarter

- MU – Kaleb Patterson 33-yard field goal, 10:16. Tied 10–10. Drive: 10 plays, 64 yards, 5:40.
- UB – Jordan Johnson 2-yard run (Adam Mitcheson kick), 2:20. Bulls 17–10. Drive: 11 plays, 79 yards, 4:48.
- MU – Sam Martin 16-yard pass from Billy Bahl (Kaleb Patterson kick), 1:10. Tied 17–17. Drive: 3 plays, 57 yards, 1:10.

Third quarter

- UB – Jordan Johnson 6-yard run (Adam Mitcheson kick blocked), 11:15. Bulls 23–17. Drive: 8 plays, 72 yards, 3:45.
- UB – Ron Willoughby 9-yard pass from Joe Licata (2-point pass failed), 4:29. Bulls 29–17. Drive: 9 plays, 75 yards, 4:10.

Fourth quarter

- MU – Ryan Smith 2-yard pass from Billy Bahl (Kaleb Patterson kick), 2:21. Bulls 29–24. Drive: 11 plays, 80 yards, 2:01.

Leading Passers

- UB – Joe Licata 22/29 Comp/Att 289 Yds, 2 TD, 1 INT
- MU – Billy Bahl 13/36 Comp/Att 224 Yds, 2 TD

Leading Rushers

- UB – Jordan Johnson 28 Rushes 123 Yds. 4.4 Avg 48 Lng.
- MU – Leonard Ross 6 Rushes 42 Yds. 7.0 Avg 20 Lng.

Leading Receivers

- UB – Ron Willoughby 2 Rec. 87 Yds. 43.5 Avg 78 Lng.
- MU – Sam Martin 4 Rec. 95 Yds. 23.8 Avg 43 Lng.

Leading Tacklers

- UB – Okezie Alozie 4 Tack 2 Ast
- MU – Buchi Okafor 5 Tack 5 Ast

In their eighth game of the season, the Bulls won, 29–24 over the Miami RedHawks.

=== @ Kent State ===
Week Ten: Buffalo Bulls at Kent State Golden Flashes – Game summary

Quarter	1	2	3	4	Total
Bulls	6	0	0	12	18
Golden Flashes	0	10	7	0	17

at Dix Stadium, Kent, OH

- Date: November 5
- Game time: 7:00 p.m. EST
- Game weather: Weather: Partly cloudy • Temperature: 66 • Wind: Calm
- Game attendance: 10,379
- Referee: Mark Kluczynski
- TV: ESPN3
- Final Stats

Game information

First quarter

- UB – Jordan Johnson 10-yard run (Adam Mitcheson kick failed), 5:39. Bulls 6–0. Drive: 9 plays, 52 yards, 4:17.

Second quarter

- KSU – Demetrius Monday 69-yard interception return (Shane Hynes kick), 9:40. Golden Flashes 7–6.
- KSU – Shane Hynes 38-yard field goal, 1:49. Golden Flashes 10–6. Drive: 14 plays, 64 yards, 5:45.

Third quarter

- KSU – Ernest Calhoun 31-yard pass from George Bollas (Shane Hynes kick), 1:32. Golden Flashes 17–6. Drive: 6 plays, 84 yards, 2:34.

Fourth quarter

- UB – Ron Willoughby 29-yard pass from Joe Licata (2-point pass failed), 11:21. Golden Flashes 17–12. Drive: 12 plays, 79 yards, 5:05.
- UB – Matt Weiser 8-yard pass from Joe Licata (2-point pass failed), 0:58. Bulls 18–17. Drive: 11 plays, 54 yards, 3:28.

Leading Passers

- UB – Joe Licata 25/39 Comp/Att 190 Yds, 2 TD, 1 INT
- KSU – George Bollas 13/21 Comp/Att 107 Yds, 1 TD

Leading Rushers

- UB – Anthone Taylor 16 Rushes 64 Yds. 4.0 Avg 9 Lng.
- KSU – Trayion Durham 9 Rushes 38 Yds. 4.2 Avg 13 Lng.

Leading Receivers

- UB – Marcus McGill 6 Rec. 50 Yds. 8.3 Avg 15 Lng.
- KSU – Antwan Dixon 6 Rec. 72 Yds. 12.0 Avg 40 Lng.

Leading Tacklers

- UB – Okezie Alozie 7 Tack 5 Ast
- KSU – Nate Holley 9 Tack 3 Ast

In their ninth game of the season, the Bulls won, 18–17 over the Kent State Golden Flashes.

=== Northern Illinois ===
Week Eleven: Northern Illinois Huskies at Buffalo Bulls – Game summary

Quarter	1	2	3	4	Total
Huskies	14	14	3	10	41
Bulls	3	0	13	14	30

at UB Stadium, Amherst, NY

- Date: November 11
- Game time: 8:00 p.m. EST
- Game weather: Weather: Mostly Clear • Temperature: 45 • Wind: 9SW
- Game attendance: 14,260
- Referee: Greg Blum
- TV: ESPNU
- Final Stats

Game information

First quarter

- UB – Adam Mitcheson 26-yard field goal, 12:05. Bulls 3–0. Drive: 8 plays, 60 yards, 2:55.
- NIU – Kenny Golladay 15-yard pass from Ryan Graham (Christian Hagan kick), 6:03. Huskies 7–3. Drive: 11 plays, 59 yards, 3:24.
- NIU – Joel Bouagnon 58-yard run (Christian Hagan kick), 3:21. Huskies 14–3. Drive: 4 plays, 76 yards, 1:09.

Second quarter

- NIU – Joel Bouagnon 1-yard run (Christian Hagan kick), 8:25. Huskies 21–3. Drive: 11 plays, 77 yards, 3:33.
- NIU – Jordan Huff 1-yard run (Christian Hagan kick), 0:10. Huskies 28–3. Drive: 10 plays, 80 yards, 3:14.

Third quarter

- UB – Marcus McGill 16-yard pass from Joe Licata (Adam Mitcheson kick), 7:25. Huskies 28–10. Drive: 10 plays, 67 yards, 4:33.
- NIU – Christian Hagan 22-yard field goal, 3:52. Huskies 31–10. Drive: 10 plays, 34 yards, 3:23.
- UB – Jordan Johnson 47-yard run (Adam Mitcheson kick blocked), 1:44. Huskies 31–16. Drive: 5 plays, 78 yards, 2:03.

Fourth quarter

- UB – Cameron Lewis 68-yard interception return (Adam Mitcheson kick), 13:27. Huskies 31–23.
- NIU – Kenny Golladay 68-yard pass from Ryan Graham (Christian Hagan kick), 12:46. Huskies 38–23. Drive: 2 plays, 67 yards, 0:35.
- UB – Collin Lisa 35-yard pass from Joe Licata (Adam Mitcheson kick), 6:46. Huskies 38–30. Drive: 5 plays, 57 yards, 1:08.
- NIU – Christian Hagan 47-yard field goal, 2:50. Huskies 41–30. Drive: 4 plays, 5 yards, 0:24.

Leading Passers

- NIU – Ryan Graham 15/24 Comp/Att 190 Yds, 2 TD, 1 INT
- UB – Joe Licata 31/47 Comp/Att 354 Yds, 2 TD, 3 INT

Leading Rushers

- NIU – Joel Bouagnon 28 Rushes 156 Yds. 5.6 Avg 58 Lng.
- UB – Jordan Johnson 6 Rushes 66 Yds. 11.0 Avg 47 Lng.

Leading Receivers

- NIU – Kenny Golladay 6 Rec. 141 Yds. 23.5 Avg 68 Lng.
- UB – Ron Willoughby 6 Rec. 101 Yds. 16.8 Avg 40 Lng.

Leading Tacklers

- NIU – Marlon Moore 4 Tack 5 Ast
- UB – Nick Gilbo 11 Tack 8 Ast

In their tenth game of the season, the Bulls lost, 41–30 to the Northern Illinois Huskies.

=== @ Akron ===
Week Twelve: Buffalo Bulls at Akron Zips – Game summary

Quarter	1	2	3	4	Total
Bulls	0	14	0	7	21
Zips	14	14	7	7	42

at InfoCision Stadium, Akron, OH

- Date: November 21
- Game time: 3:30 p.m. EST
- Game weather: Weather: Overcast • Temperature: 48 • Wind: 13 mph
- Game attendance: 15,727
- Referee: Greg Sujack
- TV: CBSSN
- Final Stats

Game information

First quarter

- UA – Jerome Lane 29-yard pass from Thomas Woodson (Robert Stein kick), 10:34. Zips 7–0. Drive: 7 plays, 80 yards, 3:02.
- UA – Austin Wolf 36-yard pass from Thomas Woodson (Robert Stein kick), 9:04. Zips 14–0. Drive: 1 plays, 36 yards, 0:07.

Second quarter

- UB – Marcus McGill 5-yard pass from Joe Licata (Adam Mitcheson kick), 12:22. Zips 14–7. Drive: 13 plays, 80 yards, 3:40.
- UA – Imani Davis 11-yard pass from Thomas Woodson (Robert Stein kick), 7:51. Zips 21–7. Drive: 5 plays, 36 yards, 1:15.
- UB – Jordan Johnson 1-yard run (Adam Mitcheson kick), 2:26. Zips 21–14. Drive: 10 plays, 76 yards, 2:49.
- UA – Jerome Lane 28-yard pass from Thomas Woodson (Robert Stein kick), 0:41. Zips 28–14. Drive: 5 plays, 74 yards, 1:40.

Third quarter

- UA – Donnell Alexander 7-yard run (Robert Stein kick), 5:42. Zips 35–14. Drive: 6 plays, 58 yards, 3:01.

Fourth quarter

- UA – Donnell Alexander 35-yard run (Robert Stein kick), 8:38. Zips 42–14. Drive: 7 plays, 85 yards, 3:39.
- UB – Jordan Johnson 2-yard run (Adam Mitcheson kick), 7:24. Zips 42–21. Drive: 5 plays, 62 yards, 1:13.

Leading Passers

- UB – Joe Licata 32/51 Comp/Att 262 Yds, 1 TD, 2 INT
- UA – Thomas Woodson 17/30 Comp/Att 258 Yds, 4 TD

Leading Rushers

- UB – Anthone Taylor 18 Rushes 98 Yds. 5.4 Avg 21 Lng.
- UA – Donnell Alexander 24 Rushes 143 Yds. 6.0 Avg 35 Lng.

Leading Receivers

- UB – Ron Willoughby 11 Rec. 105 Yds. 9.5 Avg 20 Lng.
- UA – Imani Davis 7 Rec. 118 Yds. 16.9 Avg 30 Lng.

Leading Tacklers

- UB – Nick Gilbo 7 Tack 3 Ast
- UA – Jatavis Brown 6 Tack 6 Ast

In their eleventh game of the season, the Bulls lost, 42–21 to the Akron Zips.

=== UMass ===
Week Thirteen: UMass Minutemen at Buffalo Bulls – Game summary

Quarter	1	2	3	4	Total
Minutemen	14	14	0	3	31
Bulls	10	7	3	6	26

at UB Stadium, Amherst, NY

- Date: November 27
- Game time: 4:30 p.m. EST
- Game weather: Weather: Rain • Temperature: 54 • Wind: SW 17
- Game attendance: 15,648
- Referee: Tim O'Dey
- TV: ESPNU
- Final Stats

Game information

First quarter

- UM – Marquis Young 6-yard run (Logan Laurent kick), 12:16. Minutemen 7–0. Drive: 7 plays, 48 yards, 1:36.
- UM – Marquis Young 47-yard run (Logan Laurent kick), 9:15. Minutemen 14–0. Drive: 3 plays, 56 yards, 0:31.
- UB – Matt Weiser 18-yard pass from Joe Licata (Adam Mitcheson kick), 6:38. Minutemen 14–7. Drive: 7 plays, 75 yards, 2:30.
- UB – Adam Mitcheson 22-yard field goal, 3:37. Minutemen 14–10. Drive: 10 plays, 22 yards, 2:27.

Second quarter

- UB – Anthone Taylor 2-yard run (Adam Mitcheson kick), 13:09. Bulls 17–14. Drive: 3 plays, 19 yards, 0:39.
- UM – Marquis Young 1-yard run (Logan Laurent kick), 3:13. Minutemen 21–17. Drive: 9 plays, 76 yards, 4:04.
- UM – Blake Frohnapfel 14-yard run (Logan Laurent kick), 0:19. Minutemen 28–17. Drive: 5 plays, 80 yards, 0:53.

Third quarter

- UB – Adam Mitcheson 23-yard field goal, 5:50. Minutemen 28–20. Drive: 11 plays, 59 yards, 6:00.

Fourth quarter

- UB – Jordan Johnson 5-yard run (2-point pass failed), 14:34. Minutemen 28–26. Drive: 11 plays, 68 yards, 4:51.
- UM – Logan Laurent 37-yard field goal, 2:13. Minutemen 31–26. Drive: 12 plays, 48 yards, 5:06.

Leading Passers

- UM – Blake Frohnapfel 9/22 Comp/Att 163 Yds, 0 TD, 2 INT
- UB – Joe Licata 19/40 Comp/Att 287 Yds, 1 TD, 2 INT

Leading Rushers

- UM – Marquis Young 35 Rushes 240 Yds. 6.9 Avg 47 Lng.
- UB – Anthone Taylor 20 Rushes 85 Yds. 4.3 Avg 11 Lng.

Leading Receivers

- UM – Tajae Sharpe 6 Rec. 138 Yds. 23.0 Avg 49 Lng.
- UB – Marcus McGill 3 Rec. 78 Yds. 26.0 Avg 40 Lng.

Leading Tacklers

- UM – Jesse Monteiro 8 Tack 4 Ast
- UB – Ryan Williamson 6 Tack 4 Ast

In their twelfth game of the season, the Bulls lost, 31–26, to the UMass Minutemen.
