= 2015 Boise State Broncos football team =

American college football season

2015 Boise State Broncos football

Poinsettia Bowl champion

Poinsettia Bowl, W 55–7 vs. Northern Illinois
- Conference: Mountain West Conference
- Mountain Division
- Record: 9–4 (5–3 MW)
- Head coach: Bryan Harsin (2nd season)
- Offensive coordinator: Eliah Drinkwitz (1st season)
- Offensive scheme: Multiple
- Defensive coordinator: Marcel Yates (2nd season)
- Base defense: Multiple
- Home stadium: Albertsons Stadium

2015 Mountain West Conference football standings
	Conf.			Overall
Team	W		L	W		L
Mountain Division
Air Force x	6	–	2	8	–	6
New Mexico	5	–	3	7	–	6
Utah State	5	–	3	6	–	7
Boise State	5	–	3	9	–	4
Colorado State	5	–	3	7	–	6
Wyoming	2	–	6	2	–	10
West Division
San Diego State x$	8	–	0	11	–	3
Nevada	4	–	4	7	–	6
San Jose State	4	–	4	6	–	7
Fresno State	2	–	6	3	–	9
UNLV	2	–	6	3	–	9
Hawaii	0	–	8	3	–	10
Championship: San Diego State 27, Air Force 24
$ – Conference champion; x – Division champion/co-champions; Rankings from AP Poll

The 2015 Boise State Broncos football team represented Boise State University during the 2015 NCAA Division I FBS football season. The Broncos were led by second-year head coach Bryan Harsin and played their home games at Albertsons Stadium. They were members of the Mountain West Conference in the Mountain Division. They finished the season 9–4, 5–3 in Mountain West play to finish in a four-way tie for second place in the Mountain Division. They were invited to the Poinsettia Bowl where they defeated Northern Illinois.

== Preseason ==
=== Award watch lists ===
Listed in the order that they were released.

Paul Hornung Award – Sr. WR Shane Williams-Rhodes

Chuck Bednarik Award – Jr. DE Kamalei Correa & Sr. S Darian Thompson

Rimington Trophy – Sr. C Marcus Henry

Outland Trophy – Sr. C Marcus Henry

Bronko Nagurski Trophy – Jr. DE Kamalei Correa & Sr. S Darian Thompson

Jim Thorpe Award – Sr. CB Donte Deayon & Sr. S Darian Thompson

Lombardi Award – Jr. DE Kamalei Correa, Sr. C Marcus Henry, Sr. OL Rees Odhiambo & Jr. LB Tanner Vallejo

Fred Biletnikoff Award – Jr. WR Thomas Sperbeck

Wuerffel Trophy – Sr. WR Shane Williams-Rhodes

Walter Camp Award – Sr. S Darian Thompson

=== Mountain West media days ===
At the Mountain West media days, held at the Cosmopolitan in Las Vegas, Nevada, the Broncos were picked as the overwhelming favorites to win the Mountain Division title, receiving 28 of a possible 30 first place votes. Sr. C Marcus Henry and Sr. OL Rees Odhiambo were selected to the all-conference first team offense. Jr. DE Kamalei Correa, Jr. LB Tanner Vallejo, Sr. CB Donte Deayon and Sr. S Darian Thompson were selected to the all-conference first team defense.

=== Media poll ===
==== Mountain Division ====
1. Boise State – 177 (28)
2. Utah State – 150 (2)
3. Colorado State – 108
4. Air Force – 90
5. Wyoming – 64
6. New Mexico – 41

== Schedule ==
Date	Time	Opponent	Rank	Site	TV	Result	Attendance
September 4	8:15 p.m.	Washington*	No. 23	Albertsons Stadium; Boise, ID	ESPN	W 16–13	36,836
September 12	8:15 p.m.	at BYU*	No. 20	LaVell Edwards Stadium; Provo, UT	ESPN2	L 24–35	63,470
September 18	7:00 p.m.	Idaho State*		Albertsons Stadium; Boise, ID (Battle for the Liberty Bell)	CBSSN	W 52–0	33,868
September 25	6:00 p.m.	at Virginia*		Scott Stadium; Charlottesville, VA	ESPN	W 56–14	42,427
October 3	8:15 p.m.	Hawaii		Albertsons Stadium; Boise, ID	ESPN2	W 55–0	35,907
October 10	5:00 p.m.	at Colorado State	No. 25	Hughes Stadium; Fort Collins, CO	CBSSN	W 41–10	26,117
October 16	7:00 p.m.	at Utah State	No. 21	Maverik Stadium; Logan, UT	CBSSN	L 26–52	22,509
October 24	8:15 p.m.	Wyoming^{†}		Albertsons Stadium; Boise, ID	ESPN2	W 34–14	31,946
October 31	1:30 p.m.	at UNLV		Sam Boyd Stadium; Whitney, NV	ESPNU	W 55–27	14,315
November 14	8:15 p.m.	New Mexico		Albertsons Stadium; Boise, ID	ESPNU	L 24–31	32,780
November 20	7:30 p.m.	Air Force		Albertsons Stadium; Boise, ID	ESPN2	L 30–37	30,332
November 27	1:30 p.m.	at San Jose State		Spartan Stadium; San Jose, CA	CBSSN	W 40–23	15,770
December 23	2:30 p.m.	vs. Northern Illinois*		Qualcomm Stadium; San Diego, CA (Poinsettia Bowl)	ESPN	W 55–7	21,501
*Non-conference game; ^{†}Homecoming; Rankings from AP Poll released prior to the game; All times are in Mountain time

Schedule source:

== Roster ==
2015 Boise State Broncos football team roster
Players
Coaches
Offense

Pos.	#	Name	Class
WR	1	Shane Williams-Rhodes	Sr
QB	3	Thomas Stuart	So
QB	4	Brett Rypien	Fr
QB	5	Garrett Collingham	Fr
WR	6	Chaz Anderson	Jr
QB	7	Anthony Upshaw	Fr
WR	8	Sean Modster	Fr
WR	9	Bryan Jefferson	Fr
RB	10	Cory Young	Fr
RB	13	Jeremy McNichols	So
QB	14	Ryan Finley	So
WR	16	Taylor Pope	Jr
WR	17	Austin Cottrell	So
QB	18	Alex Ogle	Fr
WR	20	Terrell Johnson	Sr
RB	21	Jack Fields	Sr
RB	26	Devan Demas	Jr
WR	28	A. J. Richardson	Fr
RB	30	Ryan Wolpin	So
RB	39	Kelsey Young	Sr
TE	47	Matt Pistone	Fr
OL	52	Andrew Tercek	So
OL	57	Tennessee Su'ese'e	Fr
OL	59	Mason Hampton	So
OL	60	Kellen Buhr	Jr
OL	63	Hunter Nettles	Jr
OL	66	Mario Yakoo	Jr
OL	67	Garrett Larson	Fr
OL	68	Dan Urquhart	Jr
OL	70	Steven Baggett	Jr
OL	71	Rees Odhiambo	Sr
OL	72	Marcus Henry	Sr
OL	73	Travis Averill	Jr
OL	74	Archie Lewis	So
OL	76	Jerhen Ertel	Sr
OL	77	John Molchon	Fr
OL	78	Andres Preciado	Fr
OL	79	Eric Quevedo	Fr
WR	80	D. J. Dean	So
WR	81	Akilian Butler	Fr
WR	82	Thomas Sperbeck	Jr
WR	83	David McKinzie	So
TE	84	Jake Hardee	Sr
TE	85	Holden Huff	Sr
TE	86	Chase Blakley	Fr
TE	87	Alec Dhaenans	So
TE	88	Jake Roh	So
WR	89	Brock Barr	Jr
TE	91	David Lucero	Fr
TE	93	Jake Knight	So

Defense

Pos.	#	Name	Class
CB	2	Jonathan Moxey	Jr
S	3	Chanceller James	Jr
S	4	Darian Thompson	Sr
CB	5	Donte Deayon	Sr
MLB	7	Joe Martarano	So
DL	8	Kamalei Correa	Jr
CB	9	Mercy Maston	Sr
CB	14	Tyler Horton	Fr
S	15	Evan Tyler	Fr
S	17	Brandon Brown	So
DE	18	Jabril Frazier	Fr
OLB	20	Tanner Vallejo	Jr
CB	21	Ladarryl Blair	Fr
OLB	22	Drew Berger	Fr
S	23	Damion Wright	Fr
LB	24	Kameron Miles	So
CB	25	Raymond Ford	Jr
CB	26	Garrett Estrada	Fr
CB	27	Donzale Roddie	Fr
S	29	Dylan Sumner-Gardner	So
CB	30	Isaiah Johnson	Fr
S	31	Skyler Seibold	Fr
DE	32	Rondell McNair	Sr
OLB	33	Gabe Perez	Jr
S	34	Darreon Jackson	Fr
MLB	35	Marquis Hendrix	Fr
OLB	36	Tyler Gray	Sr
S	37	Cameron Hartsfield	So
OLB	38	Leighton Vander Esch	Fr
DT	40	Armand Nance	Sr
OLB	41	Will Heffner	Fr
MLB	43	Joe Provenzano	Fr
MLB	44	Darren Lee	Jr
CB	47	Eric Yates	Fr
DT	48	David Moa	Fr
DL	50	Sawyer Shields	Fr
OLB	51	Ben Weaver	Jr
DL	53	Sam Whitney	Fr
DL	54	Matt Locher	Fr
DT	55	Tutulupeatau Mataele	Sr
DT	58	Robert Ash	Sr
DT	69	Tyler Horn	Sr
DT	90	Justin Taimatuia	Sr
DE	91	Durrant Miles	Fr
DT	92	Paul Semons	Fr
DE	94	Sam McCaskill	Jr
DE	95	Khaleb Hill	Fr
DT	96	Elliot Hoyte	Jr
DT	97	Austin Silsby	So
DT	98	Antoine Turner	Sr
DT	99	Dereck Boles	Fr

Special teams

Pos.	#	Name	Class
P	19	Sean Wale	Jr
LS	42	Matt Cota	So
LS	46	Kevin Keane	Sr
K	48	Blake Gonzalez	Fr
K	49	Tyler Rausa	Jr
K	93	Max O'Rourke	Fr

Head coach

- Bryan Harsin

Coordinators/assistant coaches

- Kent Riddle – Associate head coach/Special teams coordinator/Tight ends
- Steve Caldwell – Associate head coach/Defensive linemen
- Eliah Drinkwitz – Offensive coordinator/Quarterbacks
- Marcel Yates – Co-defensive coordinator/Safeties
- Andy Avalos – Co-defensive coordinator
- Junior Adams – Wide receivers
- Lee Marks – Running backs
- Scott Huff – Offensive linemen
- Julius Brown – Secondary
- Jeff Pitman – Director, Strength and Conditioning
- Byron Hout – Graduate assistant
- Tommy Smith – Graduate assistant

Legend

- (C) Team captain
- (S) Suspended
- (I) Ineligible
- Injured
- Redshirt

Roster
Last update: 8/14/23

== Game summaries ==
=== Washington ===
	1	2	3	4	Total
Huskies	0	0	10	3	13
No. 24 Broncos	6	10	0	0	16

Uniform Combination
Helmet	Jersey	Pants

- Passing leaders: Ryan Finley (BSU): 16–26, 129 YDS, 1 INT; Jake Browning (WASH): 20–34, 150 YDS, 1 INT.
- Rushing leaders: Jeremy McNichols (BSU): 24 CAR, 89 YDS, 2 TD; Dwayne Washington (WASH): 8 CAR, 14 YDS
- Receiving leaders: Thomas Sperbeck (BSU): 3 REC, 28 YDS; Dwayne Washington (WASH): 7 REC, 68 YDS.

=== At BYU ===
	1	2	3	4	Total
No. 22 Broncos	7	3	14	0	24
Cougars	7	0	7	21	35

Uniform Combination
Helmet	Jersey	Pants

- Passing leaders: Ryan Finley (BSU): 25–38, 297 YDS, 1 TD, 3 INT; Tanner Mangum (BYU): 17–28, 309 YDS, 2 TD, 2 INT.
- Rushing leaders: Jeremy McNichols (BSU): 15 CAR, 46 YDS, 2 TD; Adam Hine (BYU): 19 CAR, 93 YDS, 1 TD.
- Receiving leaders: Shane William-Rhodes (BSU): 11 REC, 107 YDS; Mitchell Juergens (BYU): 4 REC, 172 YDS, 2 TD.

=== Idaho State ===
	1	2	3	4	Total
Bengals	0	0	0	0	0
Broncos	14	7	28	3	52

Uniform Combination
Helmet	Jersey	Pants

- Passing leaders: Brett Rypien (BSU): 8–9, 126 YDS; Michael Sanders (ISU): 21–42, 169 YDS, 1 INT.
- Rushing leaders: Jeremy McNichols (BSU): 15 CAR, 69 YDS, 3 TD; Xavier Finney (ISU): 14 CAR, 38 YDS.
- Receiving leaders: Thomas Sperbeck (BSU): 7 REC, 99 YDS; Madison Mangum (ISU): 7 REC, 98 YDS.

In the first quarter, starting quarterback Ryan Finley left the game after fracturing his right ankle. He was expected to miss eight weeks. However, he did not return in the 2015 season. The last two Boise State starting quarterbacks to miss time with injuries were also from broken right ankles (Ryan Dinwiddie in 2002 and Joe Southwick in 2013).

=== At Virginia ===
	1	2	3	4	Total
Broncos	17	12	17	10	56
Cavaliers	7	7	0	0	14

Uniform Combination
Helmet	Jersey	Pants

- Passing leaders: Brett Rypien (BSU): 24–35, 321 YDS, 3 TD; Matt Johns (UVA): 12–25, 199 YDS, 2 TD, 2 INT
- Rushing leaders: Jeremy McNichols (BSU): 9 CAR, 69 YDS, 1 TD; Daniel Hamm (UVA): 8 CAR, 22 YDS
- Receiving leaders: Thomas Sperbeck (BSU): 5 REC, 121 YDS, 2 TD; Taquan Mizzell (UVA): 5 REC, 59 YDS, 1 TD

=== Hawaii ===
	1	2	3	4	Total
Rainbow Warriors	0	0	0	0	0
Broncos	14	35	3	3	55

Uniform Combination
Helmet	Jersey	Pants

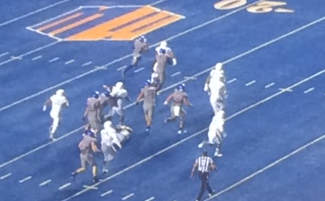
Jeremy McNichols during a 13-yard TD run in the 2nd quarter.

- Passing leaders: Brett Rypien (BSU): 19–25, 271 YDS, 3 TD; Max Wittek (UH): 7–24, 66 YDS, 2 INT.
- Rushing leaders: Jeremy McNichols (BSU): 20 CAR, 108 YDS, 2 TD; Steven Lakalaka (UH): 8 CAR, 34 YDS.
- Receiving leaders: Chaz Anderson (BSU): 5 REC, 95 YDS, 1 TD; Marcus Kemp (UH): 5 REC, 39 YDS.

=== At Colorado State ===
	1	2	3	4	Total
No. 24 Broncos	17	10	7	7	41
Rams	0	10	0	0	10

Uniform Combination
Helmet	Jersey	Pants

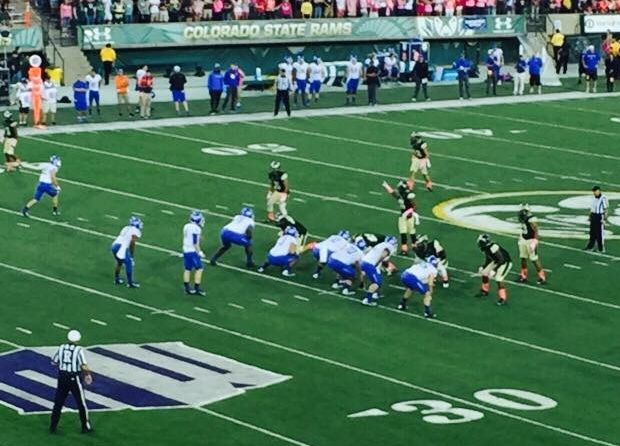
Boise State on offense in the first half.

- Passing leaders: Brett Rypien (BSU): 22–35, 339 YDS, 1 TD, 1 INT; Coleman Key (CSU): 5–19, 56 YDS, 1 TD, 2 INT.
- Rushing leaders: Jeremy McNichols (BSU): 17 CAR, 104 YDS, 2 TD; Jasen Oden, Jr. (CSU): 19 CAR, 52 YDS.
- Receiving leaders: Thomas Sperbeck (BSU): 5 REC, 178 YDS, 2 TD; Rashard Higgins (CSU): 3 REC, 42 YDS.

=== At Utah State ===
	1	2	3	4	Total
No. 20 Broncos	3	7	7	9	26
Aggies	17	28	7	0	52

Uniform Combination
Helmet	Jersey	Pants

- Passing leaders: Brett Rypien (BSU): 25–50, 299 YDS, 3 INT; Kent Myers (USU): 17–24, 157 YDS, 3 TD.
- Rushing leaders: Kelsey Young (BSU): 20 CAR, 60 YDS, 2 TD; Devante Mays (USU): 11 CAR, 63 YDS, 1 TD.
- Receiving leaders: Thomas Sperbeck (BSU): 6 REC, 156 YDS; Hunter Sharp (USU): 7 REC, 42 YDS, 2 TD.

=== Wyoming ===
	1	2	3	4	Total
Cowboys	0	7	0	7	14
Broncos	17	7	10	0	34

Uniform Combination
Helmet	Jersey	Pants

- Passing leaders: Brett Rypien (BSU): 22–28, 211 YDS, 3 TD; Cameron Coffman (WYO): 8–13, 70 YDS, 1 TD, 1 INT.
- Rushing leaders: Jeremy McNichols (BSU): 33 CAR, 166 YDS, 1 TD; Brian Hill (WYO): 23 CAR, 76 YDS.
- Receiving leaders: Thomas Sperbeck (BSU): 6 REC, 84 YDS, 2 TD; Jake Maulhardt (WYO): 6 REC, 76 YDS, 1 TD.

=== At UNLV ===
	1	2	3	4	Total
Broncos	10	14	3	28	55
Rebels	3	14	3	7	27

Uniform Combination
Helmet	Jersey	Pants

- Passing leaders: Brett Rypien (BSU): 35–52, 469 YDS, 2 TD; Blake Decker (UNLV): 29–50, 357 YDS, 2 INT.
- Rushing leaders: Jeremy McNichols (BSU): 22 CAR, 122 YDS, 1 TD; Xzaviar Campbell (UNLV): 9 CAR, 29 YDS, 1 TD.
- Receiving leaders: Thomas Sperbeck (BSU): 10 REC, 163 YDS; Devonte Boyd (UNLV): 10 REC, 116 YDS.

=== New Mexico ===
	1	2	3	4	Total
Lobos	7	7	3	14	31
Broncos	0	3	7	14	24

Uniform Combination
Helmet	Jersey	Pants

- Passing leaders: Brett Rypien (BSU): 41–75, 506 YDS, 2 TD, 3 INT; Austin Apodaca (UNM): 8–12, 172 YDS, 1 INT.
- Rushing leaders: Jeremy McNichols (BSU): 26 CAR, 128 YDS, 1 TD; Jhurell Pressley (UNM): 9 CAR, 132 YDS, 1 TD.
- Receiving leaders: Thomas Sperbeck (BSU): 20 REC, 281 YDS; Delane Hart-Johnson (UNM): 1 REC, 81 YDS.

=== Air Force ===
	1	2	3	4	Total
Falcons	3	21	10	3	37
Broncos	13	0	7	10	30

Uniform Combination
Helmet	Jersey	Pants

- Passing leaders: Brett Rypien (BSU): 23–48, 237 YDS, 1 TD; Karson Roberts (AF): 9–16, 279 YDS, 2 TD, 3 INT.
- Rushing leaders: Jeremy McNichols (BSU): 20 CAR, 151 YDS, 1 TD; Jacobi Owens (AF): 9 CAR, 132 YDS.
- Receiving leaders: Thomas Sperbeck (BSU): 7 REC, 79 YDS, 1 TD; Garrett Griffin (AF): 3 REC, 107 YDS, 1 TD.

=== At San Jose State ===
	1	2	3	4	Total
Broncos	0	9	7	24	40
Spartans	3	7	0	13	23

Uniform Combination
Helmet	Jersey	Pants

- Passing leaders: Brett Rypien (BSU): 25–33, 197 YDS, 2 TD; Kenny Potter (SJSU): 28–41, 336 YDS, 3 TD, 2 INT.
- Rushing leaders: Jeremy McNichols (BSU): 20 CAR, 192 YDS, 2 TD; Tyler Ervin (SJSU): 11 CAR, 52 YDS.
- Receiving leaders: Thomas Sperbeck (BSU): 6 REC, 45 YDS; Billy Freeman (SJSU): 7 REC, 109 YDS, 1 TD.

=== Northern Illinois–Poinsettia Bowl ===
	1	2	3	4	Total
Broncos	21	10	10	14	55
Huskies	0	7	0	0	7

Uniform Combination
Helmet	Jersey	Pants

- Passing leaders: Brett Rypien (BSU): 29–40, 377 YDS, 3 TD, 1 INT; Ryan Graham (NIU): 7–21, 38 YDS.
- Rushing leaders: Jeremy McNichols (BSU): 19 CAR, 93 YDS, 2 TD; Joel Bouagnon (NIU): 8 CAR, 16 YDS.
- Receiving leaders: Jeremy McNichols (BSU): 5 REC, 96 YDS, 1 TD; Kenny Golladay (NIU): 3 REC, 12 YDS.

Boise State out-gained Northern Illinois 654–33 in total yards. Boise State had 2 more first downs (35) than Northern Illinois had in total yards.

== Rankings ==
Ranking movements Legend: ██ Increase in ranking ██ Decrease in ranking — = Not ranked RV = Received votes
	Week															
Poll	Pre	1	2	3	4	5	6	7	8	9	10	11	12	13	14	Final
AP	23	20	RV	RV	RV	25	21	RV	—	RV	RV	—	—	—	—	RV
Coaches	24	22	RV	RV	RV	24	20	RV	RV	RV	RV	—	—	—	—	RV
CFP	Not released									—	—	—	—	—	—	Not released

== Scores by quarter ==
All opponents

	1	2	3	4	Total
Boise State	139	127	120	122	508
Opponents	47	108	40	68	263

Mountain West opponents

	1	2	3	4	Total
Boise State	57	78	34	95	264
MW Opponents	33	87	20	44	184

== Post-season awards ==
=== Mountain West Freshman of the Year ===
Brett Rypien – Fr. QB (first Boise State player to win MW freshman of the year award)

=== Mountain West first team ===
Offense

Brett Rypien – Fr. QB

Thomas Sperbeck – Jr. WR

Marcus Henry – Sr. OL

Rees Odhiambo – Sr. OL

Tyler Rausa – Jr. K

Defense

Darian Thompson – Sr. DB

=== Mountain West second team ===
Offense

Jeremy McNichols – So. RB

Jake Roh – So. TE

Defense

Kamalei Correa – Jr. DL

Donte Deayon – Sr. DB

=== Mountain West honorable mention ===
Tyler Horn – Sr. DL

Tanner Vallejo – Jr. LB

Mario Yakoo – Jr. OL

Award Reference:
