= 2015 Western Michigan Broncos football team =

American college football season

2015 Western Michigan Broncos football

MAC West Division co-champion Bahamas Bowl champion

Bahamas Bowl, W 45–31 vs. Middle Tennessee
- Conference: Mid-American Conference
- West Division
- Record: 8–5 (6–2 MAC)
- Head coach: P. J. Fleck (3rd season)
- Offensive coordinator: Kirk Ciarrocca (3rd season)
- Offensive scheme: Spread
- Defensive coordinator: Ed Pinkham (3rd season)
- Base defense: 4–3
- Home stadium: Waldo Stadium

2015 Mid-American Conference football standings
	Conf.			Overall
Team	W		L	W		L
East Division
Bowling Green x$	7	–	1	10	–	4
Ohio	5	–	3	8	–	5
Akron	5	–	3	8	–	5
Buffalo	3	–	5	5	–	7
Kent State	2	–	6	3	–	9
Miami (OH)	2	–	6	3	–	9
UMass	2	–	6	3	–	9
West Division
Northern Illinois xy	6	–	2	8	–	6
Western Michigan x	6	–	2	8	–	5
Toledo x	6	–	2	10	–	2
Central Michigan x	6	–	2	7	–	6
Ball State	2	–	6	3	–	9
Eastern Michigan	0	–	8	1	–	11
Championship: Bowling Green 34, Northern Illinois 14
$ – Conference champion; x – Division champion/co-champions; y – Championship game participant

The 2015 Western Michigan Broncos football team represented Western Michigan University (WMU) in the 2015 NCAA Division I FBS football season. They were led by third-year head coach P. J. Fleck and played their home games at Waldo Stadium as a member of the West Division of the Mid-American Conference (MAC).

== Schedule ==
Date	Time	Opponent	Site	TV	Result	Attendance
September 4	7:00 pm	No. 5 Michigan State*	Waldo Stadium; Kalamazoo, MI	ESPNU	L 24–37	30,885
September 12	6:00 pm	at Georgia Southern*	Paulson Stadium; Statesboro, GA	ESPN3	L 17–43	23,520
September 19	7:00 pm	Murray State*	Waldo Stadium; Kalamazoo, MI	ESPN3	W 52–20	20,543
September 26	3:30 pm	at No. 1 Ohio State*	Ohio Stadium; Columbus, OH	ABC/ESPN2	L 12–38	106,123
October 10	Noon	Central Michigan	Waldo Stadium; Kalamazoo, MI (Michigan MAC Trophy/Victory Cannon)	ESPN3	W 41–39	20,201
October 17	Noon	at Ohio	Peden Stadium; Athens, OH	ASN	W 49–14	22,825
October 24	2:00 pm	Miami (OH)^{†}	Waldo Stadium; Kalamazoo, MI	ESPN3	W 35–13	18,523
October 29	7:30 pm	at Eastern Michigan	Rynearson Stadium; Ypsilanti, MI (Michigan MAC Trophy)	CBSSN	W 58–28	3,534
November 5	7:30 pm	Ball State	Waldo Stadium; Kalamazoo, MI	CBSSN	W 54–7	12,058
November 11	8:00 pm	Bowling Green	Waldo Stadium; Kalamazoo, MI	ESPN2	L 27–41	14,436
November 18	8:00 pm	at Northern Illinois	Huskie Stadium; DeKalb, IL	ESPN2	L 19–27	10,194
November 27	Noon	at No. 24 Toledo	Glass Bowl; Toledo, OH	CBSSN	W 35–30	16,151
December 24	Noon	vs. Middle Tennessee*	Thomas Robinson Stadium; Nassau, Bahamas (Bahamas Bowl)	ESPN	W 45–31	13,123
*Non-conference game; ^{†}Homecoming; Rankings from AP Poll released prior to game; All times are in Eastern time

Schedule source:

== Game summaries ==
=== Ball State ===
WMU defeated Ball State 54–7 in a mid-week MACtion game nationally televised on CBS Sports Network. In the game, the Broncos gained a school-record 711 yards of total offense. Western Michigan with a 5–0 in conference games were in first place in the West Division.

== Awards ==
=== Conference Players of the Week ===
Four WMU football players have won five conference player of the week awards. Sophomore kickoff returner Darius Phillips has won two, and redshirt freshman running back Jamauri Bogan, sophomore linebacker Robert Spillane and junior quarterback Zach Terrell have each won one.

==== Jamauri Bogan ====
Bogan won the MAC West Offensive Player of the Week award for Week 7. He ran the ball nine times for 135 yards and two touchdowns in a 49–14 win over Ohio. In the game, WMU as a team rushed for 430 yards, with 404 of those coming in the second half.

==== Darius Phillips ====
Phillips was named MAC West Special Teams Player of the Week for Week 1 and 6. In Week 1, he returned four kickoffs for 185 yards, including a touchdown on a 100-yard kick off return in a loss to No. 5 Michigan State University. In Week 6. Phillips had two kick returns for 101 yards in WMU's 41–39 victory over rival Central Michigan.

==== Robert Spillane ====
Spillane was named MAC West Defensive Player of the Week for Week 8. Spillane had 9 total tackles and 3 1/2 for loss (including 1 1/2 sacks) in a 35–13 win over Miami (Ohio).

==== Zach Terrell ====
Zach Terrell was named MAC West Offensive Player of the Week for Week 9. He was 17 of 23 passing for 252 yards and ran for a team-high 71 yards in a 58–28 win over Eastern Michigan. He also rushed for one touchdown. The 71 yards rushing were a career-high.

== Coaching staff ==
The following table lists the team's coaching staff.

Name	Position	Year at WMU	Alma mater
P. J. Fleck	Head coach	3rd	Northern Illinois (2004)
Kirk Ciarrocca	Offensive coordinator	3rd	Temple (1990)
Ed Pinkham	Defensive coordinator, Defensive backs	3rd	Allegheny (1975)
Brian Callahan	Offensive line	3rd	Eastern Illinois (1992)
Mike Hart	Running backs	2nd	Michigan (2008)
Bill Kenney	Tight ends, Offensive tackles	3rd	Norwich (1982)
Tim McGarigle	Linebackers	4th	Northwestern (2006)
Vinson Reynolds	Defensive line	3rd	Northern Illinois (2004)
Matt Simon	Wide receivers	2nd	Northern Illinois (2004)
Rob Wenger	Special teams, Defensive ends	3rd	Colgate (2008)
