= 2015 Eastern Michigan Eagles football team =

American college football season

2015 Eastern Michigan Eagles football
- Conference: Mid-American Conference
- West Division
- Record: 1–11 (0–8 MAC)
- Head coach: Chris Creighton (2nd season)
- Offensive coordinator: Kalen DeBoer (2nd season)
- Offensive scheme: Spread
- Defensive coordinator: Brad McCaslin (2nd season)
- Base defense: 4–3
- Home stadium: Rynearson Stadium

2015 Mid-American Conference football standings
	Conf.			Overall
Team	W		L	W		L
East Division
Bowling Green x$	7	–	1	10	–	4
Ohio	5	–	3	8	–	5
Akron	5	–	3	8	–	5
Buffalo	3	–	5	5	–	7
Kent State	2	–	6	3	–	9
Miami (OH)	2	–	6	3	–	9
UMass	2	–	6	3	–	9
West Division
Northern Illinois xy	6	–	2	8	–	6
Western Michigan x	6	–	2	8	–	5
Toledo x	6	–	2	10	–	2
Central Michigan x	6	–	2	7	–	6
Ball State	2	–	6	3	–	9
Eastern Michigan	0	–	8	1	–	11
Championship: Bowling Green 34, Northern Illinois 14
$ – Conference champion; x – Division champion/co-champions; y – Championship game participant

The 2015 Eastern Michigan Eagles football team represented Eastern Michigan University in the 2015 NCAA Division I FBS football season. They were led by second-year head coach Chris Creighton. The Eagles played their home games at Rynearson Stadium and were members of the West Division of the Mid-American Conference. The team finished 1–11, 0–8 in MAC play to finish in last place in the West Division.

== Schedule ==
Date	Time	Opponent	Site	TV	Result	Attendance
September 5	3:30 pm	Old Dominion*	Rynearson Stadium; Ypsilanti, MI	ASN	L 34–38	6,474
September 12	4:00 pm	at Wyoming*	War Memorial Stadium; Laramie, WY	RTRM	W 48–29	19,112
September 19	3:00 pm	Ball State	Rynearson Stadium; Ypsilanti, MI	ESPN3	L 17–28	4,463
September 26	6:00 pm	Army*	Rynearson Stadium; Ypsilanti, MI	ESPN3	L 36–58	6,513
October 3	7:00 pm	at No. 9 LSU*	Tiger Stadium; Baton Rouge, LA	ESPNU	L 22–44	102,321
October 10	3:00 pm	Akron	Rynearson Stadium; Ypsilanti, MI	ESPN3	L 21–47	5,638
October 17	12:00 pm	at No. 22 Toledo	Glass Bowl; Toledo, OH	ESPN3	L 20–63	18,204
October 24	3:30 pm	at Northern Illinois	Huskie Stadium; Dekalb, IL	ESPN3	L 21–49	17,245
October 29	7:30 pm	Western Michigan	Rynearson Stadium; Ypsilanti, MI (Michigan MAC Trophy)	CBSSN	L 28–58	3,534
November 7	2:30 pm	at Miami (OH)	Yager Stadium; Oxford, OH	ESPN3	L 13–28	12,756
November 14	3:00 pm	UMass	Rynearson Stadium; Ypsilanti, MI	ESPN3	L 17–28	2,759
November 27	1:00 pm	at Central Michigan	Kelly/Shorts Stadium; Mount Pleasant, MI (Michigan MAC Trophy/rivalry)	ESPN3	L 28–35	8,049
*Non-conference game; Rankings from AP Poll released prior to the game; All times are in Eastern time

== After the season ==
The following Eagle was selected in the 2016 NFL draft after the season.

Round	Pick	Player	Position	NFL club
6	216	Darius Jackson	Running back	Dallas Cowboys
