= 2015 Ohio Bobcats football team =

American college football season

2015 Ohio Bobcats football

Camellia Bowl, L 29–31 vs. Appalachian State
- Conference: Mid-American Conference
- East Division
- Record: 8–5 (5–3 MAC)
- Head coach: Frank Solich (11th season)
- Offensive coordinator: Tim Albin (11th season)
- Offensive scheme: Spread option
- Defensive coordinator: Jim Burrow (11th season)
- Base defense: 4-3
- Home stadium: Peden Stadium

2015 Mid-American Conference football standings
	Conf.			Overall
Team	W		L	W		L
East Division
Bowling Green x$	7	–	1	10	–	4
Ohio	5	–	3	8	–	5
Akron	5	–	3	8	–	5
Buffalo	3	–	5	5	–	7
Kent State	2	–	6	3	–	9
Miami (OH)	2	–	6	3	–	9
UMass	2	–	6	3	–	9
West Division
Northern Illinois xy	6	–	2	8	–	6
Western Michigan x	6	–	2	8	–	5
Toledo x	6	–	2	10	–	2
Central Michigan x	6	–	2	7	–	6
Ball State	2	–	6	3	–	9
Eastern Michigan	0	–	8	1	–	11
Championship: Bowling Green 34, Northern Illinois 14
$ – Conference champion; x – Division champion/co-champions; y – Championship game participant

The 2015 Ohio Bobcats football team represented Ohio University in the 2015 NCAA Division I FBS football season. They were led by 11th year head coach Frank Solich and played their home games at Peden Stadium. They were members of the East Division of the Mid-American Conference. They finished the season 8–5, 5–3 on MAC play to finish in a tie for second place in the East Division. They were invited to the Camellia Bowl where they lost to Appalachian State.

== Schedule ==
Date	Time	Opponent	Site	TV	Result	Attendance
September 3	9:00 p.m.	at Idaho*	Kibbie Dome; Moscow, ID	ESPN3	W 45–28	11,587
September 12	7:00 p.m.	Marshall*	Peden Stadium; Athens, OH (Battle for the Bell)	ESPN3	W 21–10	25,210
September 19	2:00 p.m.	No. 20 (FCS) Southeastern Louisiana*	Peden Stadium; Athens, OH	ESPN3	W 35–14	22,985
September 26	3:30 p.m.	at Minnesota*	TCF Bank Stadium; Minneapolis, MN	BTN	L 24–27	53,917
October 3	2:00 p.m.	at Akron	InfoCision Stadium–Summa Field; Akron, OH	ESPN3	W 14–12	17,301
October 10	2:00 p.m.	Miami (OH)^{†}	Peden Stadium; Athens, OH (Battle of the Bricks)	BCSN	W 34–3	25,086
October 17	12:00 p.m.	Western Michigan	Peden Stadium; Athens, OH	ASN	L 14–49	22,825
October 24	3:30 p.m.	at Buffalo	University at Buffalo Stadium; Amherst, NY	ASN/ESPN3	L 17–41	17,128
November 4	8:00 p.m.	at Bowling Green	Doyt Perry Stadium; Bowling Green, OH	ESPN2	L 24–62	16,233
November 10	8:00 p.m.	Kent State	Peden Stadium; Athens, OH	ESPNU	W 27–0	15,654
November 17	7:00 p.m.	Ball State	Peden Stadium; Athens, OH	ESPNU	W 48–31	16,148
November 24	7:30 p.m.	at Northern Illinois	Huskie Stadium; Dekalb, IL	ESPNU	W 26–21	9,755
December 19	5:30 p.m.	vs. Appalachian State*	Cramton Bowl; Montgomery, AL (Camellia Bowl)	ESPN	L 29–31	19,621
*Non-conference game; ^{†}Homecoming; Rankings from AP Poll released prior to the game; All times are in Eastern time

== Game summaries ==
=== At Idaho ===
	1	2	3	4	Total
Bobcats	21	7	3	14	45
Vandals	3	10	0	15	28

=== Marshall ===
	1	2	3	4	Total
Thundering Herd	0	7	3	0	10
Bobcats	7	7	0	7	21

=== Southeastern Louisiana ===
	1	2	3	4	Total
Lions	0	0	7	7	14
Bobcats	7	14	0	14	35

=== At Minnesota ===
	1	2	3	4	Total
Bobcats	7	7	0	10	24
Golden Gophers	0	14	3	10	27

=== At Akron ===
	1	2	3	4	Total
Bobcats	7	7	0	0	14
Zips	3	3	3	3	12

=== Miami (OH) ===
	1	2	3	4	Total
RedHawks	0	3	0	0	3
Bobcats	7	10	10	7	34

=== Western Michigan ===
	1	2	3	4	Total
Broncos	0	14	21	14	49
Bobcats	0	7	0	7	14

=== At Buffalo ===
	1	2	3	4	Total
Bobcats	7	3	7	0	17
Bulls	14	17	0	10	41

=== At Bowling Green ===
	1	2	3	4	Total
Bobcats	7	7	3	7	24
Falcons	14	13	21	14	62

=== Kent State ===
	1	2	3	4	Total
Golden Flashes	0	0	0	0	0
Bobcats	7	3	10	7	27

=== Ball State ===
	1	2	3	4	Total
Cardinals	3	7	14	7	31
Bobcats	14	14	13	7	48

=== At Northern Illinois ===
	1	2	3	4	Total
Bobcats	7	13	0	6	26
Huskies	7	0	7	7	21

=== Appalachian State–Camellia Bowl ===
	1	2	3	4	Total
Bobcats	0	17	7	5	29
Mountaineers	7	0	0	24	31
