= 2015 Poinsettia Bowl =

2015 San Diego County Credit Union Poinsettia Bowl
- 11th Poinsettia Bowl
Boise State Broncos	Northern Illinois Huskies
(8–4)	(8–5)
Mountain West	MAC
55	7
Head coach: Bryan Harsin	Head coach: Rod Carey
	1	2	3	4	Total
Boise State	21	10	10	14	55
Northern Illinois	0	7	0	0	7
- Date: December 23, 2015
- Season: 2015
- Stadium: Qualcomm Stadium
- Location: San Diego, California
- MVP: Offensive: Boise State QB Brett Rypien; Defensive: Boise State DE Kamalei Correa
- Favorite: Boise State by 8
- Referee: Jeff Hilyer (Sun Belt)
- Attendance: 21,501
- Payout: US$$612,500

United States TV coverage
- Network: ESPN/ESPN Radio
- Announcers: Beth Mowins, David Diaz-Infante, and Shelley Smith (ESPN); Bill Rosinski, David Norrie, and Joe Schad (ESPN Radio)

The 2015 Poinsettia Bowl was a college football bowl game that was played on December 23, 2015 at Qualcomm Stadium in San Diego, California. Boise State Broncos from the Mountain West Conference defeated the Northern Illinois Huskies from the Mid-American Conference. It was one of the 2015–16 bowl games that concluded the 2015 FBS football season. The game started at 1:30 p.m. PST and was televised on ESPN. Sponsored by San Diego County Credit Union, the game is officially known as the San Diego County Credit Union Poinsettia Bowl.

== Team selection ==
The Boise State Broncos from the Mountain West Conference defeated the Northern Illinois Huskies from the Mid-American Conference.

=== Boise State ===
Following Boise State's regular season ending win over San Jose State, where they finished the 2015 regular season 8–4, 5–3 in West Division play to finish in a four way tie for 2nd place, the Poinsettia Bowl expressed their interest in inviting the Broncos. The Las Vegas Bowl held the first selection from the Mountain West but also had an agreement to pick BYU in either 2015 or 2019. When Las Vegas chose to invite BYU, the Mountain West's first selection fell to the Poinsettia Bowl. The Poinsettia Bowl was not obligated to take the Mountain West Champions, San Diego State, and could choose any Mountain West team they wanted. They chose the Broncos, who made their second Poinsettia Bowl appearance and first appearance since 2008 where they lost to TCU 17–16 to end their undefeated season.

=== Northern Illinois ===
Had Army become bowl eligible, they would have been invited to the Poinsettia Bowl. When they failed to become bowl eligible, the selection fell to the Mid-American Conference. The Northern Illinois Huskies were selected to set up a match-up of two of the winningest programs since 2010. The Huskies finished the regular season 8–5, 6–2 in West Division play to finish in a four way tie for the division title. They represented the West Division in the MAC Championship Game where they lost to Bowling Green. It was the Huskies sixth consecutive MAC Championship Game appearance. It was the Huskies third Poinsettia Bowl appearance with losses in 2006 and 2013.

== Game summary ==
=== Scoring Summary ===
Scoring summary

Quarter	Time	Drive			Team	Scoring information	Score	
Quarter	Time	Plays	Yards	TOP	Team	Scoring information	BSU	NIU
1	14:02	3	75	0:58	BSU	Jeremy McNichols 41-yard touchdown run, Tyler Rausa kick good	7	0
1	7:38	7	67	2:18	BSU	Jeremy McNichols 4-yard touchdown reception from Brett Rypien, Tyler Rausa kick good	14	0
1	3:28	7	53	2:36	BSU	Jeremy McNichols 1-yard touchdown run, Tyler Rausa kick good	21	0
2	9:44	7	12	3:01	BSU	20-yard field goal by Tyler Rausa	24	0
2	9:32				NIU	Aregero Turner 96 yard kickoff return, Christian Hagan kick good	24	7
2	1:51	8	60	3:35	BSU	Chaz Anderson 16-yard touchdown reception from Brett Rypien, Tyler Rausa kick good	31	7
3	7:30	12	51	4:49	BSU	27-yard field goal by Tyler Rausa	34	7
3	3:29	6	62	2:06	BSU	Alec Dhaenens 18-yard touchdown reception from Brett Rypien, Tyler Rausa kick good	41	7
4	14:52	5	61	2:07	BSU	Kelsey Young 24-yard touchdown run, Tyler Rausa kick good	48	7
4	9:52	7	69	4:06	BSU	Thomas Stuart 1-yard touchdown run, Tyler Rausa kick good	55	7
"TOP" = time of possession. For other American football terms, see Glossary of American football.							55	7

=== Statistics ===
Statistics	BSU	NIU
First downs	35	7
Plays–yards	96–654	51–33
Rushes–yards	56–227	30–(−5)
Passing yards	377	38
Passing: Comp–Att–Int	29–40–1	7–21–0
Time of possession	43:13	16:47
