= 2015 Toledo Rockets football team =

American college football season

2015 Toledo Rockets football

MAC West Division co-champion Boca Raton Bowl champion

Boca Raton Bowl, W 32–17 vs. Temple
- Conference: Mid-American Conference
- West Division
- Record: 10–2 (6–2 MAC)
- Head coach: Matt Campbell (4th season; regular season); Jason Candle (interim; bowl game)
- Offensive coordinator: Jason Candle (3rd season)
- Offensive scheme: Spread
- Defensive coordinator: Jon Heacock (2nd season)
- Base defense: 4–3 or 4–2–5
- Home stadium: Glass Bowl

2015 Mid-American Conference football standings
	Conf.			Overall
Team	W		L	W		L
East Division
Bowling Green x$	7	–	1	10	–	4
Ohio	5	–	3	8	–	5
Akron	5	–	3	8	–	5
Buffalo	3	–	5	5	–	7
Kent State	2	–	6	3	–	9
Miami (OH)	2	–	6	3	–	9
UMass	2	–	6	3	–	9
West Division
Northern Illinois xy	6	–	2	8	–	6
Western Michigan x	6	–	2	8	–	5
Toledo x	6	–	2	10	–	2
Central Michigan x	6	–	2	7	–	6
Ball State	2	–	6	3	–	9
Eastern Michigan	0	–	8	1	–	11
Championship: Bowling Green 34, Northern Illinois 14
$ – Conference champion; x – Division champion/co-champions; y – Championship game participant

The 2015 Toledo Rockets football team represented the University of Toledo in the 2015 NCAA Division I FBS football season. They were led by head coach Matt Campbell in his fourth year. They played their home games at the Glass Bowl and were members of the West Division of the Mid-American Conference. They finished the season 10–2, 6–2 in MAC play to finish in a four way tie for the West Division title. However, due to losses to Western Michigan and Northern Illinois, two other teams to finish 6–2 in the West Division, they did not represent the West Division in the MAC Championship Game. They were invited to the Boca Raton Bowl where they defeated #24 Temple.

On November 29, head coach Matt Campbell resigned to become the head coach at Iowa State. On December 2, offensive coordinator Jason Candle was promoted to head coach and led the Rockets in their bowl game.

== Schedule ==
Date	Time	Opponent	Rank	Site	TV	Result	Attendance
September 3	7:00 p.m.	Stony Brook*		Glass Bowl; Toledo, OH	ESPN3	Canceled^{[a]}	
September 12	3:00 p.m.	at No. 18 Arkansas*		War Memorial Stadium; Little Rock, AR	SEC Alt.	W 16–12	49,591
September 19	8:00 p.m.	Iowa State*		Glass Bowl; Toledo, OH	ESPNews	W 30–23	23,104
September 26	7:00 p.m.	Arkansas State*		Glass Bowl; Toledo, OH	ESPN3	W 37–7	21,385
October 3	3:00 p.m.	at Ball State		Scheumann Stadium; Muncie, IN	ASN	W 24–10	10,002
October 10	3:00 p.m.	Kent State^{†}	No. 24	Glass Bowl; Toledo, OH	ESPN3	W 38–7	23,118
October 17	12:00 p.m.	Eastern Michigan	No. 22	Glass Bowl; Toledo, OH	ESPN3	W 63–20	18,204
October 24	3:00 p.m.	at UMass	No. 19	Gillette Stadium; Foxborough, MA	ESPN3	W 51–35	12,793
November 3	8:00 p.m.	Northern Illinois	No. 24	Glass Bowl; Toledo, OH	ESPN2	L 27–32	23,089
November 10	8:00 p.m.	at Central Michigan		Kelly/Shorts Stadium; Mount Pleasant, MI	ESPN2	W 28–23	13,490
November 17	6:00 p.m.	at Bowling Green		Doyt Perry Stadium; Bowling Green, OH (rivalry)	ESPN2	W 44–28	23,492
November 27	12:00 p.m.	Western Michigan	No. 24	Glass Bowl; Toledo, OH	CBSSN	L 30–35	16,151
December 22	7:00 p.m.	vs. No. 24 Temple*		FAU Stadium; Boca Raton, FL (Boca Raton Bowl)	ESPN	W 32–17	25,908
*Non-conference game; ^{†}Homecoming; Rankings from AP Poll and CFP Rankings after November 3 released prior to game; All times are in Eastern time

^{^[a]}The game was delayed due to thunderstorms at 7:51 p.m., and resumed at around 9:50 p.m. It was halted again just before the start of the second half and was then suspended at around 12:13 a.m. Toledo was leading Stony Brook 16–7 prior to the game being suspended. Toledo wanted to resume the game the next day, but Stony Brook feared its players would not have been able to get home at a reasonable hour. As there was no room to make the game up later in the season, it was officially declared "no contest."

== Rankings ==
Ranking movements Legend: ██ Increase in ranking ██ Decrease in ranking — = Not ranked RV = Received votes
	Week															
Poll	Pre	1	2	3	4	5	6	7	8	9	10	11	12	13	14	Final
AP	—	—	RV	RV	RV	24	22	19	20	20	RV	RV	24	RV	RV	RV
Coaches	—	—	RV	RV	RV	RV	25	20	20	20	RV	RV	RV	RV	—	RV
CFP	Not released									24	—	—	24	—	—	Not released

== Victory over an SEC team ==
On September 12, 2015, the Rockets defeated the 18th-ranked team, the Arkansas Razorbacks at War Memorial Stadium in Little Rock, Arkansas It was Toledo's first win over an SEC team in four tries and the first time the Rockets defeated a Top 25 non-conference opponent on the road.

Senior quarterback Phillip Ely threw for 237 yards and Toledo's defense shut down Arkansas in the red zone as the Rockets upset the No. 18 Razorbacks, 16-12 in front of a stunned crowd of nearly 50,000. The Rockets held Arkansas to just 103 yards rushing on 31 attempts. Arkansas quarterback Brandon Allen did throw for 412 yards but the Razorbacks came away with just three points in four visits in the red zone in the second half. The outcome of the contest was not decided until the final play. With just one second remaining, Allen fired a pass from the 16-yard line into the end zone to Keon Hatcher that sailed over his head, igniting a celebration on the Toledo sideline.

It was the first win of what became a seven-game winning streak for the Rockets.
