= 2015 Akron Zips football team =

American college football season

2015 Akron Zips football

Famous Idaho Potato Bowl champion

Famous Idaho Potato Bowl, W 23–21 vs. Utah State
- Conference: Mid-American Conference
- East Division
- Record: 8–5 (5–3 MAC)
- Head coach: Terry Bowden (4th season)
- Offensive coordinator: A. J. Milwee (3rd season)
- Offensive scheme: Spread
- Defensive coordinator: Chuck Amato (4th season)
- Base defense: 4–3
- Home stadium: InfoCision Stadium–Summa Field

2015 Mid-American Conference football standings
	Conf.			Overall
Team	W		L	W		L
East Division
Bowling Green x$	7	–	1	10	–	4
Ohio	5	–	3	8	–	5
Akron	5	–	3	8	–	5
Buffalo	3	–	5	5	–	7
Kent State	2	–	6	3	–	9
Miami (OH)	2	–	6	3	–	9
UMass	2	–	6	3	–	9
West Division
Northern Illinois xy	6	–	2	8	–	6
Western Michigan x	6	–	2	8	–	5
Toledo x	6	–	2	10	–	2
Central Michigan x	6	–	2	7	–	6
Ball State	2	–	6	3	–	9
Eastern Michigan	0	–	8	1	–	11
Championship: Bowling Green 34, Northern Illinois 14
$ – Conference champion; x – Division champion/co-champions; y – Championship game participant

The 2015 Akron Zips football team represented the University of Akron in the 2015 NCAA Division I FBS football season. They were led by fourth-year head coach Terry Bowden and played their home games at InfoCision Stadium–Summa Field. They were members of the East Division of the Mid-American Conference. They finished the season 8–5, 5–3 in MAC play to finish in a tie for second place in the East Division. They were invited to the Famous Idaho Potato Bowl, where they defeated Utah State for their first ever bowl victory. This was Akron's fourth bowl appearance. Previous bowl games are: Grantland Rice Bowl 1968, Pioneer Bowl 1976, Motor City Bowl 2005. They made their fifth bowl game appearance in 2017 at the Boca Raton Cheribundi Bowl.

== Schedule ==
Date	Time	Opponent	Site	TV	Result	Attendance
September 5	7:00 p.m.	at No. 19 Oklahoma*	Gaylord Family Oklahoma Memorial Stadium; Norman, OK	FSN PPV	L 3–41	85,370
September 12	6:00 p.m.	Pittsburgh*	InfoCision Stadium; Akron, OH	ESPN3	L 7–24	23,425
September 19	Noon	Savannah State*	InfoCision Stadium; Akron, OH	ESPN3	W 52–9	16,763
September 26	7:00 p.m.	at Louisiana–Lafayette*	Cajun Field; Lafayette, LA	ESPN3	W 35–14	24,679
October 3	2:00 p.m.	Ohio^{†}	InfoCision Stadium; Akron, OH	ESPN3	L 12–14	17,301
October 10	3:00 p.m.	at Eastern Michigan	Rynearson Stadium; Ypsilanti, MI	ESPN3	W 47–21	5,638
October 17	3:00 p.m.	at Bowling Green	Doyt Perry Stadium; Bowling Green, OH	ESPN3	L 10–59	20,021
October 31	2:00 p.m.	Central Michigan	InfoCision Stadium; Akron, OH	ESPN3	L 6–14	18,981
November 7	Noon	at UMass	Gillette Stadium; Foxboro, MA	CBSSN	W 17–13	6,228
November 14	Noon	at Miami (OH)	Yager Stadium; Oxford, OH	ESPN3	W 37–28	15,629
November 21	3:30 p.m.	Buffalo	InfoCision Stadium; Akron, OH	CBSSN	W 42–21	15,727
November 28	Noon	Kent State	InfoCision Stadium; Akron, OH (Wagon Wheel)	ASN	W 20–0	16,391
December 22	3:30 p.m.	vs. Utah State*	Albertsons Stadium; Boise, ID (Famous Idaho Potato Bowl)	ESPN	W 23–21	18,876
*Non-conference game; ^{†}Homecoming; Rankings from AP Poll released prior to the game; All times are in Eastern time

== Game summaries ==
=== At Oklahoma ===
	1	2	3	4	Total
Zips	0	3	0	0	3
#19 Sooners	3	14	21	3	41

=== Pittsburgh ===
	1	2	3	4	Total
Panthers	3	7	7	7	24
Zips	0	7	0	0	7

=== Savannah State ===
	1	2	3	4	Total
Tigers	3	6	0	0	9
Zips	7	21	10	14	52

=== At Louisiana–Lafayette ===
	1	2	3	4	Total
Zips	7	7	14	7	35
Ragin' Cajuns	0	7	0	7	14

=== Ohio ===
	1	2	3	4	Total
Bobcats	7	7	0	0	14
Zips	3	3	3	3	12

=== At Eastern Michigan ===
	1	2	3	4	Total
Zips	14	26	7	0	47
Eagles	7	7	7	0	21

=== At Bowling Green ===
	1	2	3	4	Total
Zips	7	3	0	0	10
Falcons	7	21	21	10	59

=== Central Michigan ===
	1	2	3	4	Total
Chippewas	0	7	7	0	14
Zips	0	6	0	0	6

=== At Massachusetts ===
	1	2	3	4	Total
Zips	7	0	7	3	17
Minutemen	7	6	0	0	13

=== At Miami (OH) ===
	1	2	3	4	Total
Zips	14	13	7	3	37
RedHawks	7	0	7	14	28

=== Buffalo ===
	1	2	3	4	Total
Bulls	0	14	0	7	21
Zips	14	14	7	7	42

=== Kent State ===
	1	2	3	4	Total
Golden Flashes	0	0	0	0	0
Zips	7	7	3	3	20

=== Utah State–Famous Idaho Potato Bowl ===
	1	2	3	4	Total
Zips	7	6	7	3	23
Aggies	0	7	7	7	21

== Roster ==
2015 Akron Zips football team roster
Players
Coaches
Offense

Pos.	#	Name	Class
RB	1	Hakeem Lawrence	Jr
WR	2	Tyrell Goodman	Jr
WR	2	Michaelee Harris	Sr
WR	3	Richie Cooper	Fr
RB	4	Conor Hundley	Sr
QB	5	Tra'Von Chapman	So
QB	7	Devyn Wood	Fr
RB	8	Donnell Alexander	Sr
WR	10	Mykel Traylor-Bennett	Jr
WR	11	A. J. Coney	So
WR	12	Imani Davis	Sr
QB	13	Tommy Woodson	So
QB	14	Caleb Chapman	Fr
QB	15	Matthew Hoyer	Jr
QB	16	Kyle Pohl	Sr
WR	17	Anthony Young	So
TE	18	Josh McNeil	Jr
WR	19	Anthony Lauro	Fr
WR	21	Michael Means	Jr
RB	23	Van Edwards	Fr
RB	25	D. J. Jones	Jr
RB	28	Manny Morgan	So
RB	30	Chuck Turfe	Fr
TE	33	LaVonne Gauthney	So
WR	37	Danny Seafler	Sr
WR	39	Landon Yeartie	Fr
TE	44	Dylan Seibel	So
TE	45	Brandon Junk	Fr
FB	49	Christian Allen	Sr
OL	55	Tommy Brown	Sr
OL	56	Isaiah Williams	Sr
OL	57	Stephen Ericksen	So
OL	63	Nick Fazio	Fr
OL	66	Kyle Ritz	Fr
OL	67	Ryan Kortokrax	So
OL	70	Michael Casimos	Jr
OL	71	Quaison Osborne	Sr
OL	73	Mitchell Hlay	Fr
OL	74	Xavier Quigley	Jr
OL	75	Dylan Brumbaugh	Sr
OL	77	Andrew Bohan	Sr
OL	79	Rich Kallay	Fr
WR	80	Andrew Pratt	Sr
WR	82	Austin Wolf	So
TE	83	Michael Kish	So
TE	84	Avery Cagle	Fr
ATH	85	Jaquavis Dixon	Fr
ATH	86	Kwadarrius Smith	Fr
TE	92	Daryan Martin	Jr

Defense

Pos.	#	Name	Class
LB	1	Jatavis Brown	Sr
DB	2	Larry Hope	Jr
LB	3	Darryl Monroe	Sr
LB	5	Ulysees Gilbert III	Fr
CB	6	DeAndre Scott	Jr
LB	7	Jerome Lane	So
DL	8	Richard Dorvilus	Jr
DL	9	Rodney Coe	Sr
LB	10	Brian Bell	Fr
DB	13	Wedley Charles	Jr
S	14	James Turner	Sr
S	15	Cory Morrow	Jr
DB	17	Bryce Jones	Sr
ATH	19	Vince Lockett	Fr
CB	20	Kyron Brown	Fr
CB	21	Kris Givens	Sr
CB	22	Mikee Hayes	So
DB	24	Jordan George	Fr
CB	27	John Senter	Sr
CB	29	Bryce Cheek	Sr
S	31	Jamal Baggett	Fr
S	32	Zach Guiser	So
LB	33	Jason Williams	Fr
DL	34	Jamal Marcus	Jr
LB, TE	35	Newman Williams	Fr
DL	36	Cody Grice	Sr
LB	40	John Lako	Fr
DB	43	Nathan Bischof	Fr
DB	46	Zachary Sweat	Jr
DL	50	Brock Boxen	Fr
LB	52	Josh Ward	Fr
DE, LB	53	Travonte Junius	Fr
LB	54	Dylan Evans	Sr
DE	56	Deon'Tae Moore	So
LB	58	Andrew Hauser	Jr
LB	59	John Rachal	Jr
DL	90	Se'Von Pittman	Jr
DE	93	Daumantuas Venckus	Jr
DL	95	Darius Copeland	So
DE	96	Alfonso Horner	Sr
DL	97	Undrea Bullard	Fr
DL	97	Brennan Williams	Fr
DL	98	Christopher Spruill	So
DT	99	Tyler Shipman	Fr

Special teams

Pos.	#	Name	Class
K	37	Tom O'Leary	So
P, K	38	Zach Paul	Sr
P	41	Kyle Foster	Fr
PK	43	Zach Gingerich	So
PK	47	Shawk Kirk	Fr
PK	48	Robert Stein	Sr
PK, P	60	Nick Gasser	Fr
LS	65	Hayden Grover	Fr
LS	88	Michael Buddenberg	So

Head coach

- Terry Bowden

Coordinators/assistant coaches

- Chuck Amato (Associate head coach / defensive coordinator)
- A. J. Milwee (offensive coordinator / quarterbacks)
- Jeff Bowden (special teams coordinator / wide receivers)
- Trent Boykin (Tight Ends / H-Backs)
- Darrell Funk (offensive line / offensive run game coordinator)
- Erick Hickson (running backs)
- Otis Mounds (Cornerbacks / defensive passing game coordinator)
- Todd Stroud (Defensive Line / Director of Football Strength & Conditioning / recruiting coordinator)
- Mike Woodford (Safeties)
- Brett Ekkens (offensive graduate assistant)
- Tim Hargrett (offensive graduate assistant)
- Kory Gribbin (defensive graduate assistant)
- John Hughes (defensive graduate assistant)
- Ben Murphy (Director of football operations)
- John Nemec (Director of player personnel)
- Mark Ouimet (assistant director of football operations)

Legend

- (C) Team captain
- (S) Suspended
- (I) Ineligible
- Injured
- Redshirt

Roster
Last update: December 20, 2016
