= 2015 Northern Illinois Huskies football team =

American college football season

2015 Northern Illinois Huskies football

MAC West Division co-champion

MAC Championship Game, L 14–34 vs. Bowling Green

Poinsettia Bowl, L 7–55 vs. Boise State
- Conference: Mid-American Conference
- West Division
- Record: 8–6 (6–2 MAC)
- Head coach: Rod Carey (3rd season)
- Offensive coordinator: Bob Cole (3rd season)
- Offensive scheme: Multiple
- Defensive coordinator: Jay Niemann (5th season)
- Base defense: 4–3
- MVPs: Kenny Golladay; Boomer Mays
- Captains: Aidan Conlon; Paris Logan; Boomer Mays; Marlon Moore; Andrew Ness
- Home stadium: Huskie Stadium

2015 Mid-American Conference football standings
	Conf.			Overall
Team	W		L	W		L
East Division
Bowling Green x$	7	–	1	10	–	4
Ohio	5	–	3	8	–	5
Akron	5	–	3	8	–	5
Buffalo	3	–	5	5	–	7
Kent State	2	–	6	3	–	9
Miami (OH)	2	–	6	3	–	9
UMass	2	–	6	3	–	9
West Division
Northern Illinois xy	6	–	2	8	–	6
Western Michigan x	6	–	2	8	–	5
Toledo x	6	–	2	10	–	2
Central Michigan x	6	–	2	7	–	6
Ball State	2	–	6	3	–	9
Eastern Michigan	0	–	8	1	–	11
Championship: Bowling Green 34, Northern Illinois 14
$ – Conference champion; x – Division champion/co-champions; y – Championship game participant

The 2015 Northern Illinois Huskies football team represented Northern Illinois University as a member of the West Division of the Mid-American Conference (MAC) during the 2015 NCAA Division I FBS football season. Led by third-year head coach Rod Carey, the Huskies compiled an overall record of 8–6 with a mark of 6–2 in conference play, finishing in a four-way tie for the MAC West Division title with Central Michigan, Toledo, and Western Michigan. Northern Illinois advance to the MAC Championship Game, where they lost to Bowling Green. The Huskies were invited to the Boca Raton Bowl, to the Poinsettia Bowl, where they were defeated by Boise State. The team played home games at Huskie Stadium in DeKalb, Illinois.

The season marked the Huskies' eighth consecutive trip to a bowl game and their fourth consecutive bowl game loss.

== Schedule ==
Date	Time	Opponent	Site	TV	Result	Attendance
September 5	6:30 p.m.	UNLV*	Huskie Stadium; DeKalb, IL	CBSSN	W 38–30	15,455
September 12	2:30 p.m.	Murray State*	Huskie Stadium; DeKalb, IL	ESPN3	W 57–26	17,465
September 19	2:30 p.m.	at No. 1 Ohio State*	Ohio Stadium; Columbus, OH	ABC/ESPN2	L 13–20	104,095
September 26	12:00 p.m.	at Boston College*	Alumni Stadium; Chestnut Hill, MA	ESPN3	L 14–17	30,193
October 3	2:00 p.m.	at Central Michigan	Kelly/Shorts Stadium; Mt. Pleasant, MI	ESPN3	L 19–29	17,380
October 10	2:30 p.m.	Ball State	Huskie Stadium; DeKalb, IL (Bronze Stalk Trophy)	ESPN3	W 59–41	13,535
October 17	1:30 p.m.	at Miami (OH)	Yager Stadium; Oxford, OH	ESPN3	W 45–12	20,278
October 24	2:30 p.m.	Eastern Michigan^{†}	Huskie Stadium; DeKalb, IL	ESPN3	W 49–21	17,245
November 3	7:00 p.m.	at No. 20 Toledo	Glass Bowl; Toledo, OH	ESPN2	W 32–27	23,089
November 11	7:00 p.m.	at Buffalo	University at Buffalo Stadium; Buffalo, NY	ESPNU	W 41–30	14,260
November 18	7:00 p.m.	Western Michigan	Huskie Stadium; DeKalb, IL	ESPN2	W 27–19	10,194
November 24	6:30 p.m.	Ohio	Huskie Stadium; DeKalb, IL	ESPNU	L 21–26	9,755
December 4	7:00 p.m.	vs. Bowling Green*	Ford Field; Detroit, MI (MAC Championship Game)	ESPN2	L 14–34	16,425
December 23	3:30 p.m.	vs. Boise State*	Qualcomm Stadium; San Diego, CA (Poinsettia Bowl)	ESPN	L 7–55	21,501
*Non-conference game; ^{†}Homecoming; Rankings from AP Poll released prior to the game; All times are in Central time

== Game summaries ==
=== UNLV ===
	1	2	3	4	Total
Rebels	7	10	3	10	30
Huskies	3	7	14	14	38

The Huskies trailed by seven points at halftime, but scored four touchdowns in the second half to beat the Rebels 38–30. Northern Illinois quarterback Drew Hare was 21-for-26 for 360 yards and two touchdowns, and wide receiver Kenny Golladay caught nine passes for 213 yards in his first game for NIU.

=== Murray State ===
	1	2	3	4	Total
Racers	7	3	6	10	26
Huskies	6	14	20	17	57

After getting off to another slow start, the Huskies overpowered the Racers 57–26. Drew Hare threw a career-high four touchdown passes. Kenny Golladay had eight catches for 144 yards and was one of ten Northern Illinois receivers who caught passes.

=== At Ohio State ===
	1	2	3	4	Total
Huskies	7	3	0	3	13
Buckeyes	3	7	10	0	20

The Buckeyes, ranked No. 1 in the nation, beat the Huskies 20–13 in a close-fought game. Northern Illinois had won their three previous games against Big Ten opponents.

=== At Boston College ===
	1	2	3	4	Total
Huskies	0	7	0	7	14
Eagles	0	7	7	3	17

In another close game, the Eagles, with the nation's top-ranked defense, beat the Huskies 17–14. In his first start as the Boston College quarterback, Troy Flutie, the nephew of Doug Flutie, completed five of 11 passes for 92 yards with one touchdown and one interception.

=== At Central Michigan ===
	1	2	3	4	Total
Huskies	10	0	3	6	19
Chippewas	3	0	23	3	29

In their first conference game of the season, the Huskies led 10–3 at halftime, but committed four turnovers in the second half, allowing 19 unanswered points by the Chippewas. This marked NIU's first three-game losing streak since 2009.

=== Ball State ===
	1	2	3	4	Total
Cardinals	3	17	7	14	41
Huskies	0	28	10	21	59

After falling behind 10–0, the Huskies scored on nine of their next ten possessions. NIU quarterback Drew Hare was 29-for-32 in passing for a 90.2% completion rate, a new school record. Cardinals quarterback Riley Neal threw for 393 yards and four touchdowns, but the Huskies prevailed, 59–41, winning the Bronze Stalk Trophy for the seventh year in a row.

=== At Miami (OH) ===
	1	2	3	4	Total
Huskies	21	0	10	14	45
RedHawks	0	3	2	7	12

The Huskies scored three unanswered touchdowns in the first quarter, and went on to beat the RedHawks 45–12 for their first road victory of the season. NIU receiver Kenny Golladay had six catches for 73 yards, and Joel Bouagnon ran for 134 yards and three touchdowns on 14 carries. Cornerback Shawun Lurry had his seventh interception of the season, the most in the nation.

=== Eastern Michigan ===
	1	2	3	4	Total
Eagles	0	0	14	7	21
Huskies	14	21	7	7	49

The Huskies led the Eagles 35–0 at halftime, and went on to win their Homecoming game 49–21. Drew Hare threw four touchdown passes, and Joel Bouagnon and Jordan Huff each gained more than 100 yards rushing.

=== At Toledo ===
	1	2	3	4	Total
Huskies	10	6	3	13	32
#20 Rockets	17	0	7	3	27

The Rockets, ranked #20 in the AP poll, led for most of the game, but the Huskies pulled ahead with two minutes remaining and won 32–27. After Drew Hare sustained a leg injury midway through the second quarter, Ryan Graham took over as NIU quarterback, completing 9 of 12 passes for 132 yards and running for 41 yards.

=== At Buffalo ===
	1	2	3	4	Total
Huskies	14	14	3	10	41
Bulls	3	0	20	7	30

After leading 28–3 at halftime, the Huskies hung on to beat the Bulls 41–30 for their fifth straight win. In his first start at the Huskies quarterback, redshirt freshman Ryan Graham was 15-of-24 passing for 190 yards with two touchdowns and one interception, and also ran for 78 yards. Joel Bouagnon ran for a career-high 156 yards and had two touchdowns.

=== Western Michigan ===
	1	2	3	4	Total
Broncos	3	7	9	0	19
Huskies	7	7	0	13	27

NIU had fallen behind after three quarters, but then running back Joel Bouagnon and wide receiver Kenny Golladay each scored a touchdown, and the Huskies beat the Broncos 27–19. Jordan Huff ran for 159 yards on eight carries, including an 87-yard touchdown.

=== Ohio ===
	1	2	3	4	Total
Bobcats	7	13	0	6	26
Huskies	7	0	7	7	21

The Bobcats beat the Huskies, 26–21. After Ryan Graham was injured, freshman Tommy Fiedler took over as NIU quarterback, completing 9 of 17 throws for 113 yards with one touchdown and no interceptions. The loss snapped the Huskies' 22-game winning streak of games played in November, and their 17-game winning streak of games against MAC East opponents.

The loss left NIU's title hopes in limbo, but when Toledo lost to Western Michigan three days later, the Huskies qualified for their sixth consecutive MAC Championship Game, and third straight against Bowling Green.

=== Bowling Green–MAC Championship Game ===
	1	2	3	4	Total
Falcons	7	14	7	6	34
Huskies	0	0	14	0	14

In the Mid-American Conference Championship Game, the Falcons beat the Huskies 34–14. It was the teams' third consecutive meeting in the MAC title game. Bowling Green quarterback Matt Johnson completed 25 of 37 passes for 235 yards with two touchdowns and two interceptions, finishing the season with 4,700 yards passing, a new MAC record. Falcons running back Travis Greene rushed for 183 yards on 29 carries. It was the first career start for NIU freshman quarterback Tommy Fiedler, who threw 12 of 28 for 152 yards, one touchdown, and three interceptions.

=== Boise State–Poinsettia Bowl ===
	1	2	3	4	Total
Broncos	21	10	10	14	55
Huskies	0	7	0	0	7

According to the Chicago Tribune, "Two of the winningest programs in recent years will meet for the first time when Northern Illinois takes on Boise State in the Poinsettia Bowl on Dec. 23 in San Diego.... Northern Illinois has won 65 games in the last six seasons. Only Alabama, Oregon, Florida State and Ohio State have won more. Boise State has 63 victories in that span." This was the eighth year in a row that the Huskies played in a bowl game.

Boise State beat Northern Illinois 55–7. The Broncos totaled 654 yards of offense, compared to 33 yards for the Huskies, whose touchdown came on a kickoff return. The Boise State win meant that this was the team's 14th straight senior class to win 40 or more games.
