= 2015 Central Michigan Chippewas football team =

American college football season

2015 Central Michigan Chippewas football

MAC West Division co-champion

Quick Lane Bowl, L 14–21 vs. Minnesota
- Conference: Mid-American Conference
- West Division
- Record: 7–6 (6–2 MAC)
- Head coach: John Bonamego (1st season)
- Offensive coordinator: Morris Watts (2nd season)
- Defensive coordinator: Greg Colby (1st season)
- Home stadium: Kelly/Shorts Stadium

2015 Mid-American Conference football standings
	Conf.			Overall
Team	W		L	W		L
East Division
Bowling Green x$	7	–	1	10	–	4
Ohio	5	–	3	8	–	5
Akron	5	–	3	8	–	5
Buffalo	3	–	5	5	–	7
Kent State	2	–	6	3	–	9
Miami (OH)	2	–	6	3	–	9
UMass	2	–	6	3	–	9
West Division
Northern Illinois xy	6	–	2	8	–	6
Western Michigan x	6	–	2	8	–	5
Toledo x	6	–	2	10	–	2
Central Michigan x	6	–	2	7	–	6
Ball State	2	–	6	3	–	9
Eastern Michigan	0	–	8	1	–	11
Championship: Bowling Green 34, Northern Illinois 14
$ – Conference champion; x – Division champion/co-champions; y – Championship game participant

The 2015 Central Michigan Chippewas football team represented Central Michigan University in the 2015 NCAA Division I FBS football season. They were led by first-year head coach John Bonamego and played their home games at Kelly/Shorts Stadium. They were members of the West Division of the Mid-American Conference. They finished the season 7–6, 6–2 in MAC play to finish in a four-way tie for the West Division title. However, due to losses to Western Michigan and Toledo, two other teams to finish 6–2 in the West Division, they did not represent the West Division in the MAC Championship Game. They were invited to the Quick Lane Bowl where they were defeated by Minnesota.

== Schedule ==
Date	Time	Opponent	Site	TV	Result	Attendance
September 3	7:00 p.m.	Oklahoma State*	Kelly/Shorts Stadium; Mount Pleasant, MI	ESPNU	L 13–24	19,717
September 12	3:00 p.m.	Monmouth*	Kelly/Shorts Stadium; Mount Pleasant, MI	ESPN3	W 31–10	21,092
September 19	12:30 p.m.	at Syracuse*	Carrier Dome; Syracuse, NY	ACCN	L 27–30 ^{OT}	27,949
September 26	12:00 p.m.	at No. 2 Michigan State*	Spartan Stadium; East Lansing, MI	BTN	L 10–30	75,218
October 3	3:00 p.m.	Northern Illinois^{†}	Kelly/Shorts Stadium; Mount Pleasant, MI	ESPN3	W 29–19	17,380
October 10	12:00 p.m.	at Western Michigan	Waldo Stadium; Kalamazoo, MI (rivalry)	ASN	L 39–41	20,201
October 17	1:00 p.m.	Buffalo	Kelly/Shorts Stadium; Mount Pleasant, MI	ESPN3	W 51–14	14,301
October 24	3:00 p.m.	at Ball State	Scheumann Stadium; Muncie, IN	ESPN3	W 23–21	10,025
October 31	2:00 p.m.	at Akron	InfoCision Stadium; Akron, OH	ESPN3	W 14–6	18,981
November 10	8:00 p.m.	Toledo	Kelly/Shorts Stadium; Mount Pleasant, MI	ESPN2	L 23–28	13,490
November 18	8:00 p.m.	at Kent State	Dix Stadium; Kent, OH	ESPNU	W 27–14	8,742
November 27	1:00 p.m.	Eastern Michigan	Kelly/Shorts Stadium; Mount Pleasant, MI (rivalry)	ESPN3	W 35–28	8,049
December 28	5:00 p.m.	vs. Minnesota*	Ford Field; Detroit, MI (Quick Lane Bowl)	ESPN2	L 14–21	34,217
*Non-conference game; ^{†}Homecoming; Rankings from AP Poll released prior to the game; All times are in Eastern time

== Game summaries ==
=== Oklahoma State ===
	1	2	3	4	Total
Cowboys	3	7	7	7	24
Chippewas	3	3	7	0	13

=== Monmouth ===
	1	2	3	4	Total
Hawks	0	3	7	0	10
Chippewas	7	24	0	0	31

=== At Syracuse ===
	1	2	3	4	OT	Total
Chippewas	3	7	7	7	3	27
Orange	10	14	0	0	6	30

=== At Michigan State ===
	1	2	3	4	Total
Chippewas	0	7	3	0	10
Spartans	7	10	0	13	30

=== Northern Illinois ===
	1	2	3	4	Total
Huskies	10	0	3	6	19
Chippewas	3	0	23	3	29

=== At Western Michigan ===
	1	2	3	4	Total
Chippewas	7	9	3	20	39
Broncos	10	17	7	7	41

=== Buffalo ===
	1	2	3	4	Total
Bulls	7	0	0	7	14
Chippewas	14	23	7	7	51

=== At Ball State ===
	1	2	3	4	Total
Chippewas	10	0	7	6	23
Cardinals	7	7	0	7	21

=== At Akron ===
	1	2	3	4	Total
Chippewas	0	7	7	0	14
Zips	0	6	0	0	6

=== Toledo ===
	1	2	3	4	Total
Rockets	14	7	0	7	28
Chippewas	0	10	7	6	23

=== At Kent State ===
	1	2	3	4	Total
Chippewas	17	3	7	0	27
Golden Flashes	0	14	0	0	14

=== Eastern Michigan ===
	1	2	3	4	Total
Eagles	7	14	7	0	28
Chippewas	0	7	28	0	35

=== Minnesota–Quick Lane Bowl ===
	1	2	3	4	Total
Chippewas	0	7	0	7	14
Golden Gophers	3	7	3	8	21
