= Kenny Golladay =

American football player (born 1993)

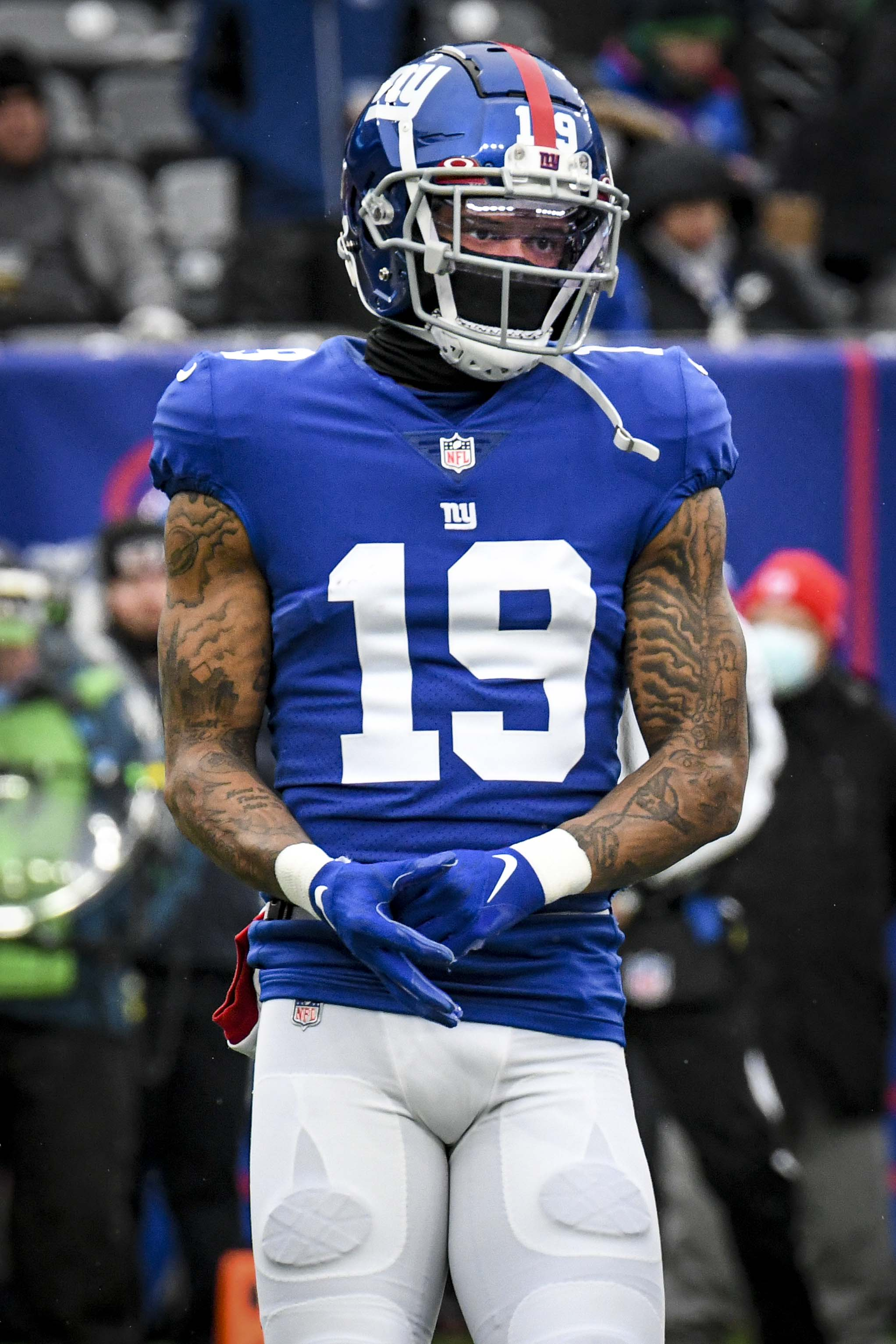
- Golladay with the New York Giants in 2022

No. 19
- Position: Wide receiver

Personal information
- Born: November 3, 1993 (age 33); Chicago, Illinois, U.S.
- Listed height: 6 ft 4 in (1.93 m)
- Listed weight: 213 lb (97 kg)

Career information
- High school: St. Rita (Chicago)
- College: North Dakota (2012–2013); Northern Illinois (2014–2016)
- NFL draft: 2017: 3rd round, 96th overall pick

Career history
- Detroit Lions (2017–2020); New York Giants (2021–2022)

Awards and highlights
- Pro Bowl (2019); NFL receiving touchdowns leader (2019); First-team All-MAC (2016); Second-team All-MAC (2015)

Career NFL statistics
- Receptions: 226
- Receiving yards: 3,670
- Receiving touchdowns: 22
- Stats at Pro Football Reference

Kenny Golladay (born November 3, 1993) is an American former professional football player who was a wide receiver in the National Football League (NFL) for the Detroit Lions and New York Giants. He played college football for the North Dakota Fighting Hawks and Northern Illinois Huskies and was selected by the Lions in the third round of the 2017 NFL draft. He led the NFL in receiving touchdowns with the Lions in 2019.

== Early life ==
Golladay attended and played high school football at Chicago's St. Rita High School. He earned first-team Blue Division All-Catholic League honors for his senior season.

== College career ==
=== North Dakota ===
Golladay began his collegiate career at the University of North Dakota in 2012. As a freshman, Golladay had 30 catches for 429 yards and a touchdown. In his sophomore season in 2013, Golladay had a breakout year with a team-high 69 catches for 884 yards and eight touchdowns.

=== Northern Illinois ===
After two seasons at North Dakota, Golladay transferred to Northern Illinois University in 2014. His transfer coincided with North Dakota's firing of head coach Chris Mussman. He had to sit out one season per NCAA transfer rules. As a junior, Golladay had 73 catches for 1,129 yards and 10 touchdowns in 2015.

In his final collegiate season, Golladay had 87 catches for 1,156 yards and eight touchdowns in 2016.

== Professional career ==
=== Pre-draft ===
On December 23, 2016, it was announced that Golladay had accepted his invitation to play in the 2017 East–West Shrine Game but was not able to play after he suffered an elbow injury during Senior Bowl practice. He was one of 58 collegiate wide receivers to attend the NFL Scouting Combine in Indianapolis, Indiana. He finished 20th among all wide receivers in the 40-yard dash and 26th in the three-cone drill. On March 10, 2017, Golladay attended Northern Illinois' pro day, but opted to stand on his combine numbers and only performed positional drills. He performed well and caught every pass as scouts and team representatives from 18 NFL teams attended. Although 13 other prospects attended, Golladay was the featured prospect at the Huskies' pro day. He attended private workouts and visits with the Green Bay Packers, Detroit Lions, Pittsburgh Steelers, and New Orleans Saints. At the conclusion of the pre-draft process, Golladay was projected to be a fourth or fifth round pick by NFL draft experts and scouts. He was ranked the 21st best wide receiver in the draft by NFLDraftScout.com.

Pre-draft measurables
Height	Weight	Arm length	Hand span	40-yard dash	10-yard split	20-yard split	20-yard shuttle	Three-cone drill	Vertical jump	Broad jump	Bench press
6 ft 4 in (1.93 m)	218 lb (99 kg)	32 in (0.81 m)	9 3/4 in (0.25 m)	4.50 s	1.58 s	2.64 s	4.15 s	7.00 s	35 1/2 in (0.90 m)	10 ft 0 in (3.05 m)	18 reps
All values from NFL Combine

=== Detroit Lions ===
==== 2017 ====
Golladay was selected in the 2017 NFL draft by the Lions with in the third round with the 96th overall pick. On June 19, 2017, Golladay was signed to a four-year, $3.19 million contract that included a signing bonus of $718,824.

Throughout training camp, Golladay competed against T. J. Jones, Keshawn Martin, Jared Abbrederis, and Ryan Spadola for the third wide receiver role. Golladay made his NFL debut in the Lions' first preseason game at the Indianapolis Colts and caught three passes for 53 receiving yards and two touchdowns in their 24–10 victory. His first preseason touchdown came on a 23-yard touchdown pass from quarterback Jake Rudock in the first quarter. Head coach Jim Caldwell named Golladay the third wide receiver on the depth chart, behind Golden Tate and Marvin Jones.

He made his professional regular season debut in the Lions' season-opener against the Arizona Cardinals and made four receptions for 69 yards and two touchdowns in the Lions' 35–23 victory. His first career touchdown came on a 10-yard pass from Matthew Stafford in the fourth quarter and he also caught a 45-yard reception to seal the game. Golladay missed five games (Weeks 3–9) after suffering a strained hamstring. On December 3, 2017, Golladay earned his first career start and caught two passes for 44 yards in the Lions' 44–20 loss at the Baltimore Ravens. In Week 17, Golladay caught two passes for a season-high 80 yards and scored a 54-yard touchdown during a 35–11 victory at the Packers. Golladay finished the 2017 season with 28 receptions for 477 receiving yards and three touchdown receptions in 11 games and five starts. The Lions finished second in the NFC North with a 9–7 record and fired head coach Jim Caldwell at the end of the season.

==== 2018 ====
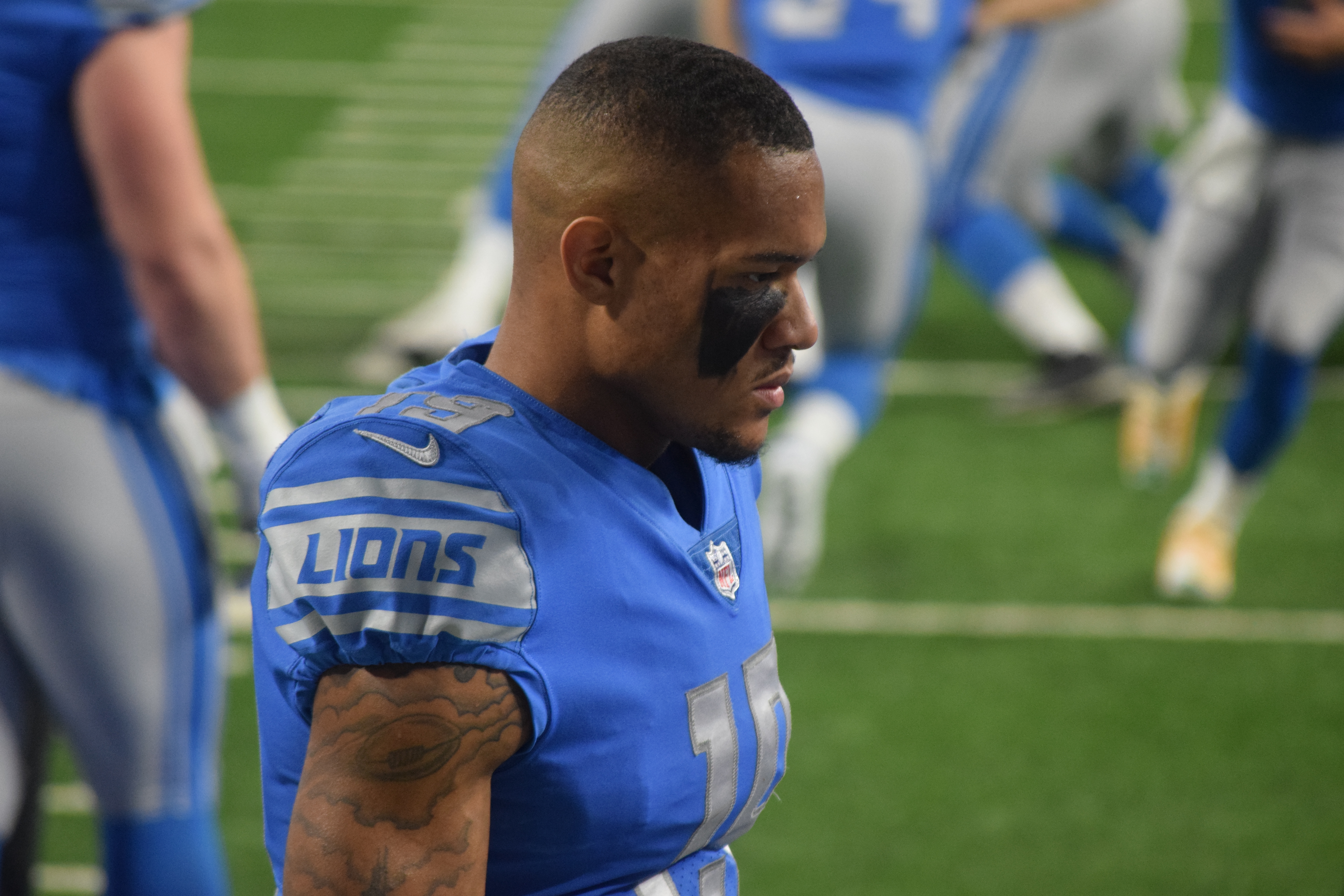
Golladay with the Lions in 2018

With new head coach Matt Patricia, Golladay started his second professional season off strong with seven receptions for 114 yards in a losing effort to the New York Jets in the season opener on Monday Night Football. After the loss to the Jets, he scored a receiving touchdown in three of the following four games. In Week 11, against the Carolina Panthers, he had eight receptions for 113 yards and a touchdown in the 20–19 victory. In Week 15, against the Buffalo Bills, he had seven receptions for 146 yards in the 14–13 loss. He finished the season as the Lions' leading receiver with 70 receptions for 1,063 yards and five touchdowns.

==== 2019 ====
In Week 2 against the Los Angeles Chargers, Golladay caught eight passes for 117 yards and a touchdown as the Lions won 13–10. In Week 4 against the Kansas City Chiefs, Golladay caught five passes for 67 yards and two touchdowns in the 34–30 loss. In Week 6 against the Packers, Golladay caught five passes for 121 yards in the 23–22 loss. In Week 8 against the New York Giants, Golladay caught six passes for 123 yards and two touchdowns in the 31–26 win. In Week 9 against the Oakland Raiders, Golladay caught four passes for a season high 132 yards and a touchdown in the 31–24 loss. During the Thanksgiving Series against the Chicago Bears in Week 13, Golladay finished with 158 receiving yards on only four receptions, with one of them being a 75-yard touchdown. The Lions lost 24–20. Golladay was selected to his first Pro Bowl at the end of the season. He finished the 2019 season with 65 receptions for 1,190 receiving yards and a league-leading 11 receiving touchdowns.

==== 2020 ====
Golladay was placed on the reserve/COVID-19 list by the Lions on July 29, 2020, and was activated a week later.

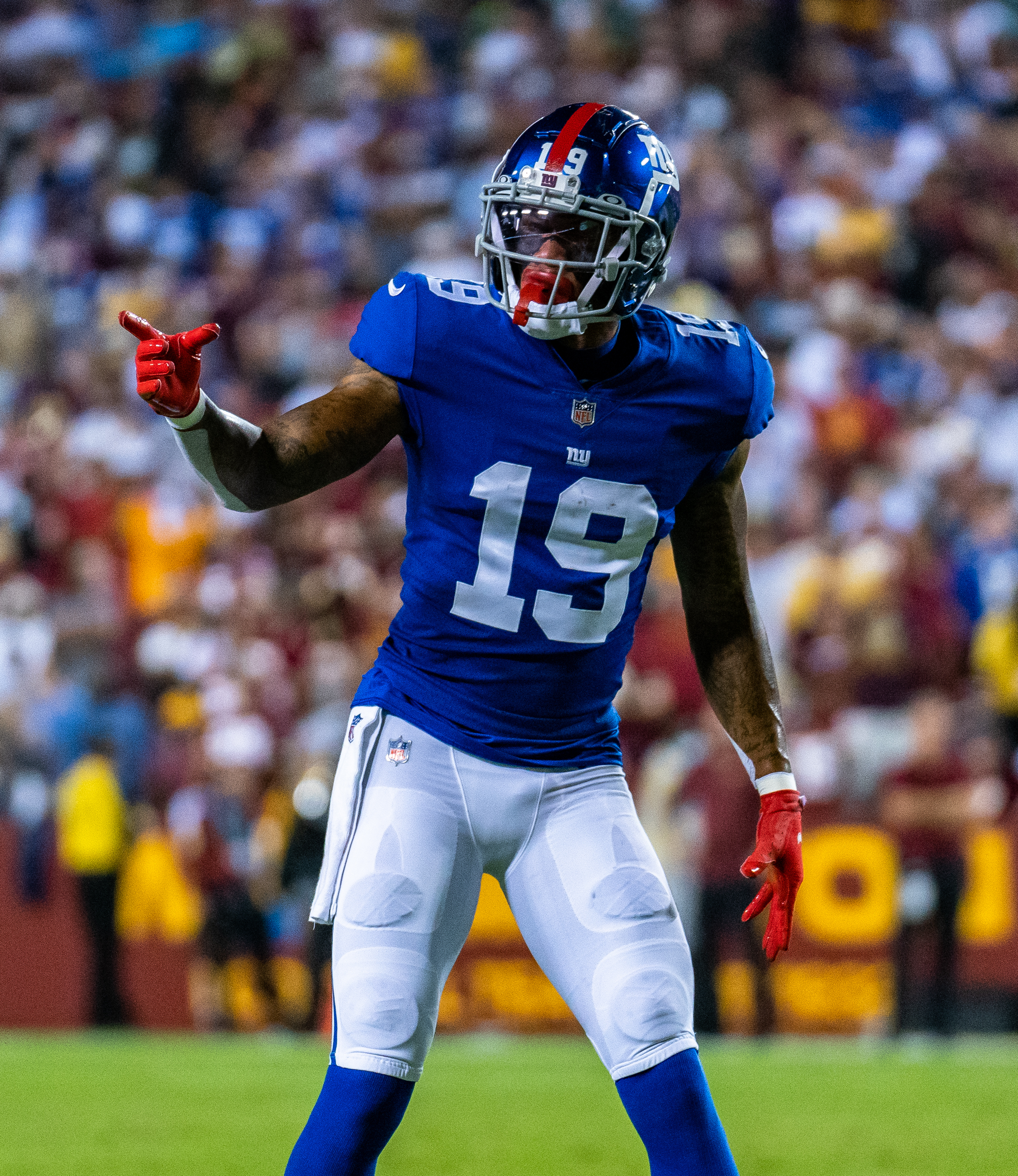
Golladay with the Giants in 2021

Golladay missed the first two games due to a hamstring injury. He made his return in Week 3 against the Cardinals. During the game, Golladay caught six passes for 57 yards and his first receiving touchdown of the season during the 26–23 win. In Week 6 against the Jacksonville Jaguars, he had four receptions for 105 receiving yards in the 34–16 victory. In Week 7 against the Atlanta Falcons, Golladay recorded six catches for 114 yards during the 23–22 win. Golladay suffered a devastating hip injury in the Week 8 game against Indianapolis that kept him out of the rest of the 2020 season and derailed his future career. He finished the 2020 season with 20 receptions for 338 receiving yards and two receiving touchdowns.

=== New York Giants ===
==== 2021 ====
On March 20, 2021, Golladay signed a four-year, $72 million contract with the New York Giants. In Week 4, against the Saints, he had six receptions for 116 receiving yards in the 27–21 overtime victory. With the effects of the hip injury that he had suffered from the previous season lingering and affecting his production, Golladay finished his first season with the Giants with highly disappointing stats, totaling 37 receptions for 521 yards and no touchdowns in 14 games played.

==== 2022 ====
In the 2022 season, Golladay was criticized for a lack of production, including having drops in games against the Dallas Cowboys, and Houston Texans, and missing four games due to injury. Through Week 13, Golladay only had four catches for 51 yards, and had fallen out of favor for Isaiah Hodgins and Marcus Johnson. In Week 18 against the Philadelphia Eagles, Golladay recorded his first touchdown of the season on a 25–yard pass from Davis Webb.

Many NFL analysts have ranked Golladay's contract one of the NFL's worst free agent signings. On March 15, 2023, the Giants released Golladay.

== Career statistics ==
=== NFL ===
Legend
	Led the league
**Bold**	Career high

Year	Team	Games		Receiving						Rushing					Fumbles	
Year	Team	GP	GS	Tgt	Rec	Yds	Avg	Lng	TD	Att	Yds	Avg	Lng	TD	Fum	Lost
2017	DET	11	5	48	28	477	17.0	54	3	**1**	**9**	**9.0**	**9**	0	0	0
2018	DET	15	13	**119**	**70**	1,063	15.2	60T	5	**1**	8	8.0	8	0	**1**	0
2019	DET	**16**	**16**	116	65	**1,190**	**18.3**	**75T**	**11**	—	—	—	—	—	**1**	**1**
2020	DET	5	5	32	20	338	16.9	48	2	—	—	—	—	—	0	0
2021	NYG	14	14	76	37	521	14.1	36	0	—	—	—	—	—	0	0
2022	NYG	12	4	17	6	81	13.5	25	1	—	—	—	—	—	0	0
Total		73	57	408	226	3,670	16.2	75T	22	2	17	8.5	9	0	2	1

=== College ===
Season	Team	GP	Receiving			
Season	Team	GP	Rec	Yds	Avg	TD
2015	Northern Illinois	14	73	1,129	15.5	10
2016	Northern Illinois	12	87	1,156	13.3	8
Career		26	160	2,285	14.3	18

== Personal life ==
On October 8, 2024, Golladay was arrested in Elmhurst, Illinois and charged with driving under the influence, stopping in the roadway, improper lane usage, speeding, and possession of open alcohol by a driver.
