= 2015 MAC Championship Game =

2015 Marathon MAC Championship Game
- Conference Championship
Bowling Green Falcons	Northern Illinois Huskies
(9–3)	(8–4)
34	14
Head coach: Dino Babers	Head coach: Rod Carey
	1	2	3	4	Total
Bowling Green	7	14	7	6	34
Northern Illinois	0	0	14	0	14
- Date: December 4, 2015
- Season: 2015
- Stadium: Ford Field
- Location: Detroit, Michigan
- MVP: Travis Greene (RB, Bowling Green)
- Favorite: Bowling Green by 14
- Attendance: 16,425

United States TV coverage
- Network: ESPN2/IMG College
- Announcers: Dave Flemming, Mack Brown, Allison Williams (ESPN2); David Shumate, Jon Jansen (IMG College)

2015 Mid-American Conference football standings
	Conf.			Overall
Team	W		L	W		L
East Division
Bowling Green x$	7	–	1	10	–	4
Ohio	5	–	3	8	–	5
Akron	5	–	3	8	–	5
Buffalo	3	–	5	5	–	7
Kent State	2	–	6	3	–	9
Miami (OH)	2	–	6	3	–	9
UMass	2	–	6	3	–	9
West Division
Northern Illinois xy	6	–	2	8	–	6
Western Michigan x	6	–	2	8	–	5
Toledo x	6	–	2	10	–	2
Central Michigan x	6	–	2	7	–	6
Ball State	2	–	6	3	–	9
Eastern Michigan	0	–	8	1	–	11
Championship: Bowling Green 34, Northern Illinois 14
$ – Conference champion; x – Division champion/co-champions; y – Championship game participant

The 2015 MAC Championship Game was an NCAA Division I college football conference championship game for the Mid-American Conference. The game was played at Ford Field in Detroit on Friday, December 4, 2015, and featured Bowling Green (East Division winners) defeat Northern Illinois (West Division) 34–14.

== History ==
For the third consecutive season the Bowling Green Falcons and Northern Illinois Huskies faced off in the MAC Championship Game. The previous season, the Huskies defeated the Falcons 51-17 to win the conference title. 2015 marked the sixth consecutive MAC Championship appearance for the Huskies. They are 3-3 in previous appearances.

This was the fourth MAC Championship Game appearance for Bowling Green and their third consecutive appearance; they first appeared in 2003 and are 1-2 in previous appearances. Their Championship was in 2013.

== Teams ==
=== Bowling Green Falcons ===
Bowling Green dominated the MAC East, with their only conference loss coming to West division co-champion Toledo. Bowling Green's resume also featured non-conference wins over Big Ten Conference teams Maryland and Purdue and a narrow three-point loss to a Memphis team that finished 9–3 in the regular season. Bowling Green clinched a berth in the championship game following their win over Western Michigan on November 11th.

=== Northern Illinois Huskies ===
The Huskies clinched a spot in the game following a tie breaker advantage over Toledo, Western Michigan and Central Michigan in the West Division.

== Scoring summary ==
2015 MAC Championship Game
Bowling Green Falcons (9–3, 7–1) vs. Northern Illinois Huskies (8–4, 6–2)

Quarter	1	2	3	4	Total
Bowling Green	7	14	7	6	34
Northern Illinois	0	0	14	0	14

at Ford Field • Detroit, MI

- Date: Friday, December 4, 2015
- Game time: 8:00 p.m. EST
- Game weather: N/A (game played indoors)
- Game attendance: 16,425
- Referee: M. Kluczynski • Umpire: Bob Holcomb • Linesman: Kole Knueppel • Line judge: Mark Bennett • Back judge: Doug Warns • Field judge: D. Pender • Side judge: Rich Ames • Center judge: Bryan Banks
- TV announcers (ESPN2/IMG College): Dave Flemming, Mack Brown, Allison Williams (ESPN2)
  David Shumate, Jon Jansen (IMG College)

Game information

First Quarter

- (04:15) BGSU – Fred Coppet 4 yard run (Tyler Tate kick) (Drive: 10 plays, 70 yards, 2:40; Bowling Green 7–0)

Second quarter

- (05:28) BGSU – Derek Lee 2 yard pass from Matt Johnson (Tyler Tate kick) (Drive: 3 plays, 17 yards, :56; Bowling Green 14–0)
- (01:04) BGSU – Travis Greene 25 yard run (Tyler Tate kick) (Drive: 8 plays, 84 yards, 2:32; Bowling Green 21–0)

Third quarter

- (12:26) BGSU – Roger Lewis 45 yard pass from Matt Johnson (Tyler Tate kick) (Drive: 5 plays, 73 yards, 1:37; Bowling Green 28–0)
- (05:43) NIU – Desroy Maxwell 32 yard pass from Tommy Fiedler (Christian Hagan kick) (Drive: 5 plays, 46 yards, 1:29; Bowling Green 28–7)
- (02:24) NIU – Shawun Lurry 64 yard interception return (Christian Hagan kick) (Bowling Green 28–14)

Fourth quarter

- (12:32) BGSU – Travis Greene 1 yard run (Tyler Tate kick blocked) (Drive: 12 plays, 83 yards, 4:47; Bowling Green 34–14)

Statistics	Bowling Green	Northern Illinois
First downs	25	17
Plays–yards	501	259
Rushes–yards	53-266-3	38–107-0
Passing yards	235	152
Passing: comp–att–int	25–37–2	12–28–3
Turnovers		
Time of possession	34:26	25:34

Team	Category	Player	Statistics
Bowling Green	Passing	Matt Johnson	25/37, 235 yards, 2 TDS, 2 INTS
Bowling Green	Rushing	Travis Greene	29 carries, 183 yards, 2 TDS
Bowling Green	Receiving	Gehrig Dieter	7 receptions, 75 yards
Northern Illinois	Passing	Tommy Fiedler	12/28, 152 yards, 1 TD, 3 INTS
Northern Illinois	Rushing	Joel Bouagnon	14 carries, 57 yards
Northern Illinois	Receiving	Desroy Maxwell	3 receptions, 68 yards, 1 TD
