= Okezie Alozie =

American football player (born 1993)

No. 3
- Position: Outside linebacker

Personal information
- Born: November 29, 1993 (age 32); Shreveport, Louisiana, U.S.
- Listed height: 6 ft 0 in (1.83 m)
- Listed weight: 220 lb (100 kg)

Career information
- High school: Freedom (Bethlehem, Pennsylvania)
- College: Buffalo Bulls

Awards and highlights
- PFF Honorable Mention All-American (2015); Third-team All-MAC (2015)

Okezie Alozie (born November 29, 1993) is an American former college football player. He played as an outside linebacker at the University at Buffalo.

== Early life ==
Alozie attended Freedom High School in Bethlehem Township, Pennsylvania where he rushed for over 1,000 yards and 21 touchdowns as a senior for the Patriots. As a track sprinter he ran the 100 meters in 10.9h seconds and was on the 4x100 relay team.

== College career ==
In 2015, Alozie finished with 85 tackles, 10.5 tackles for loss, 5 sacks, 2 interceptions(1 for TD), 2 forced fumbles, 9 passes defended, and 1 fumble recovery. He was named an Honorable Mention All-American by ProFootballFocus and an All-MAC selection by both the league's coaches and Phil Steele.
