= 2015 Fresno State Bulldogs football team =

American college football season

2015 Fresno State Bulldogs football
- Conference: Mountain West Conference
- West Division
- Record: 3–9 (2–6 MW)
- Head coach: Tim DeRuyter (4th season)
- Offensive coordinator: Dave Schramm (4th season)
- Offensive scheme: Spread
- Defensive coordinator: Nick Toth (4th season)
- Base defense: 3–4
- Home stadium: Bulldog Stadium

2015 Mountain West Conference football standings
	Conf.			Overall
Team	W		L	W		L
Mountain Division
Air Force x	6	–	2	8	–	6
New Mexico	5	–	3	7	–	6
Utah State	5	–	3	6	–	7
Boise State	5	–	3	9	–	4
Colorado State	5	–	3	7	–	6
Wyoming	2	–	6	2	–	10
West Division
San Diego State x$	8	–	0	11	–	3
Nevada	4	–	4	7	–	6
San Jose State	4	–	4	6	–	7
Fresno State	2	–	6	3	–	9
UNLV	2	–	6	3	–	9
Hawaii	0	–	8	3	–	10
Championship: San Diego State 27, Air Force 24
$ – Conference champion; x – Division champion/co-champions; Rankings from AP Poll

The 2015 Fresno State Bulldogs football team represented California State University, Fresno in the 2015 NCAA Division I FBS football season. The Bulldogs were led by fourth-year head coach Tim DeRuyter and played their home games at Bulldog Stadium. They were members of the Mountain West Conference in the West Division. They finished the season 3–9, 2–6 in Mountain West play to finish in a tie for fourth place in the West Division.

== Schedule ==
Date	Time	Opponent	Site	TV	Result	Attendance
September 3	7:00 pm	Abilene Christian*	Bulldog Stadium; Fresno, CA	MWN	W 34–13	32,547
September 12	12:30 pm	at No. 17 Ole Miss*	Vaught–Hemingway Stadium; Oxford, MS	ESPN2	L 21–73	60,302
September 19	7:30 pm	No. 21 Utah*	Bulldog Stadium; Fresno, CA	CBSSN	L 24–45	33,675
September 26	7:30 pm	at San Jose State	Spartan Stadium; San Jose, CA (Valley Cup)	CBSSN	L 23–49	17,264
October 3	7:30 pm	at San Diego State	Qualcomm Stadium; San Diego, CA (Battle for the Oil Can)	CBSSN	L 7–21	29,996
October 10	7:30 pm	Utah State^{†}	Bulldog Stadium; Fresno, CA	CBSSN	L 14–56	30,540
October 16	7:30 pm	UNLV	Bulldog Stadium; Fresno, CA	ESPN2	W 31–28	25,604
October 24	11:00 am	at Air Force	Falcon Stadium; Colorado Springs, CO	ESPN3	L 14–42	20,213
November 5	7:30 pm	Nevada	Bulldog Stadium; Fresno, CA	ESPN2	L 16–30	25,476
November 14	8:00 pm	at Hawaii	Aloha Stadium; Honolulu, HI (rivalry)	KSEE	W 42–14	21,485
November 21	12:00 pm	at BYU*	LaVell Edwards Stadium; Provo, UT	BYUtv/ESPN3	L 10–52	57,515
November 28	6:00 pm	Colorado State	Bulldog Stadium; Fresno, CA	CBSSN	L 31–34	26,375
*Non-conference game; ^{†}Homecoming; Rankings from AP Poll released prior to game; All times are in Pacific time

Schedule source:

== Game summaries ==
=== Abilene Christian ===
	1	2	3	4	Total
Wildcats	7	0	0	6	13
Bulldogs	14	7	10	3	34

=== At Ole Miss ===
	1	2	3	4	Total
Bulldogs	0	14	7	0	21
No. 17 Rebels	28	7	21	17	73

=== Utah ===
	1	2	3	4	Total
No. 21 Utes	10	7	7	21	45
Bulldogs	3	0	0	21	24

=== San Jose State ===
	1	2	3	4	Total
Spartans	14	7	14	14	49
Bulldogs	0	10	13	0	23

=== At San Diego State ===
	1	2	3	4	Total
Bulldogs	0	7	0	0	7
Aztecs	0	7	7	7	21

=== Utah State ===
	1	2	3	4	Total
Aggies	7	22	14	13	56
Bulldogs	7	0	0	7	14

=== UNLV ===
	1	2	3	4	Total
Rebels	7	7	14	0	28
Bulldogs	7	7	3	14	31

=== At Air Force ===
	1	2	3	4	Total
Bulldogs	14	0	0	0	14
Falcons	7	14	14	7	42

=== Nevada ===
	1	2	3	4	Total
Wolf Pack	7	10	6	7	30
Bulldogs	0	16	0	0	16

=== At Hawaii ===
	1	2	3	4	Total
Bulldogs	7	21	7	7	42
Rainbow Warriors	0	7	7	0	14

=== At BYU ===
	1	2	3	4	Total
Bulldogs	3	0	0	7	10
Cougars	3	21	14	14	52

=== Colorado State ===
	1	2	3	4	Total
Rams	7	7	13	7	34
Bulldogs	10	14	0	7	31
