= 2015 Hawaii Rainbow Warriors football team =

American college football season

2015 Hawaii Rainbow Warriors football
- Conference: Mountain West Conference
- West Division
- Record: 3–10 (0–8 MW)
- Head coach: Norm Chow (4th season; first 10 games); Chris Naeole (interim; remainder of season)
- Offensive coordinator: Don Bailey (1st season)
- Offensive scheme: Pro spread
- Defensive coordinator: Tom Mason (1st season; first 12 games); Abraham Elimimian (interim; game 13)
- Base defense: 3–4 hybrid
- Home stadium: Aloha Stadium

2015 Mountain West Conference football standings
	Conf.			Overall
Team	W		L	W		L
Mountain Division
Air Force x	6	–	2	8	–	6
New Mexico	5	–	3	7	–	6
Utah State	5	–	3	6	–	7
Boise State	5	–	3	9	–	4
Colorado State	5	–	3	7	–	6
Wyoming	2	–	6	2	–	10
West Division
San Diego State x$	8	–	0	11	–	3
Nevada	4	–	4	7	–	6
San Jose State	4	–	4	6	–	7
Fresno State	2	–	6	3	–	9
UNLV	2	–	6	3	–	9
Hawaii	0	–	8	3	–	10
Championship: San Diego State 27, Air Force 24
$ – Conference champion; x – Division champion/co-champions; Rankings from AP Poll

The 2015 Hawaii Rainbow Warriors football team represented the University of Hawaiʻi at Mānoa in the 2015 NCAA Division I FBS football season. The team was led by head coach Norm Chow, who was fired after week 10 and replaced by Chris Naeole on an interim basis. They played their home games at Aloha Stadium. They were members of the Mountain West Conference in the West Division. They finished the season 3–10, 0–8 in Mountain West play to finish in last place in the West Division.

On November 27, 2015, Nick Rolovich was hired as the new head football coach at the University of Hawaii replacing Norm Chow.

== Schedule ==
Date	Time	Opponent	Site	TV	Result	Attendance
September 3	7:00 pm	Colorado*	Aloha Stadium; Honolulu, HI	CBSSN	W 28–20	24,255
September 12	9:30 am	at No. 1 Ohio State*	Ohio Stadium; Columbus, OH	BTN	L 0–38	107,145
September 19	6:00 pm	UC Davis*	Aloha Stadium; Honolulu, HI	Oceanic PPV	W 47–27	25,714
September 26	2:00 pm	at No. 24 Wisconsin*	Camp Randall Stadium; Madison, WI	BTN	L 0–28	80,829
October 3	4:15 pm	at Boise State	Albertsons Stadium; Boise, ID	ESPN2	L 0–55	35,907
October 10	6:00 pm	San Diego State^{†}	Aloha Stadium; Honolulu, HI	Oceanic PPV	L 14–28	28,543
October 17	1:00 pm	at New Mexico	University Stadium; Albuquerque, NM	Oceanic PPV/RTRM	L 27–28	20,541
October 24	10:00 am	at Nevada	Mackay Stadium; Reno, NV	Oceanic PPV	L 20–30	19,992
October 31	4:30 pm	Air Force	Aloha Stadium; Honolulu, HI (Kuter Trophy)	CBSSN	L 7–58	22,430
November 7	12:00 pm	at UNLV	Sam Boyd Stadium; Whitney, NV	Oceanic PPV	L 21–41	20,006
November 14	6:00 pm	Fresno State	Aloha Stadium; Honolulu, HI (rivalry)	Oceanic PPV	L 14–42	21,485
November 21	6:00 pm	San Jose State	Aloha Stadium; Honolulu, HI (rivalry)	Oceanic PPV	L 23–42	20,320
November 28	6:00 pm	Louisiana–Monroe*	Aloha Stadium; Honolulu, HI	Oceanic PPV/Campus Insiders	W 28–26	21,284
*Non-conference game; ^{†}Homecoming; Rankings from AP Poll released prior to game; All times are in Hawaii time

Schedule source:

== Game summaries ==
=== Colorado ===
	1	2	3	4	Total
Buffaloes	0	14	3	3	20
Rainbow Warriors	8	10	7	3	28

=== At Ohio State ===
	1	2	3	4	Total
Rainbow Warriors	0	0	0	0	0
#1 Buckeyes	7	7	3	21	38

The 107,145 in attendance is the largest crowd to ever attend a University of Hawaii football game.

=== UC Davis ===
	1	2	3	4	Total
Aggies	3	7	0	17	27
Rainbow Warriors	3	10	13	21	47

=== At Wisconsin ===
	1	2	3	4	Total
Rainbow Warriors	0	0	0	0	0
#24 Badgers	7	7	7	7	28

=== At Boise State ===
	1	2	3	4	Total
Rainbow Warriors	0	0	0	0	0
Broncos	14	35	3	3	55

=== San Diego State ===
	1	2	3	4	Total
Aztecs	14	7	0	7	28
Rainbow Warriors	0	7	7	0	14

=== At New Mexico ===
	1	2	3	4	Total
Rainbow Warriors	10	14	0	3	27
Lobos	7	7	7	7	28

=== At Nevada ===
	1	2	3	4	Total
Rainbow Warriors	3	14	3	0	20
Wolf Pack	0	10	3	17	30

=== Air Force ===
	1	2	3	4	Total
Falcons	14	20	3	21	58
Rainbow Warriors	0	0	0	7	7

=== At UNLV ===
	1	2	3	4	Total
Rainbow Warriors	0	7	7	7	21
Rebels	7	7	10	17	41

=== Fresno State ===
	1	2	3	4	Total
Bulldogs	7	21	7	7	42
Rainbow Warriors	0	7	7	0	14

=== San Jose State ===
	1	2	3	4	Total
Spartans	21	14	7	0	42
Rainbow Warriors	0	0	14	9	23

=== Louisiana–Monroe ===
	1	2	3	4	Total
Warhawks	3	7	10	6	26
Rainbow Warriors	7	14	7	0	28

== Depth chart ==
Defense

FS
Marrell Jackson
Dejaun Butler

OLB	ILB	ILB	OLB
Lance Williams	Jerrol Garcia-Williams	Julian Gener	Makani Kema-Kaleiwahea
Jeremy Castro	Simon Poti	Benetton Fonua	Jahlani Tavai

SS
Trayvon Henderson
Daniel Lewis Jr.

CB
Ne’Quan Phillips
Jalen Rogers

DE	NT	DE
Luke Shawley	Penitito Faalologo	Kennedy Tulimasealii
Meffy Koloamatangi	Kory Rasmussen	Ka’aumoana Gifford

CB
Nick Nelson
Jamal Mayo

Offense

WR
Marcus Kemp
Ammon Barker

WR
Dylan Collie
Isaiah Bernard

LT	LG	C	RG	RT
Ben Clarke	Elijah Tupai	Asotui Eli	Dejon Allen	R.J. Hollis
Leo Koloamatangi	John Wa’a	Brenden Urban	Eperone Moananu	Leo Koloamatangi

TE
Metuisela Unga
Harold Moleni

WR
Quinton Pedroza
Vasquez Haynes

QB
Max Wittek
Ikaika Woolsey

Key reserves
Keelan Ewaliko – WR
Justin Vele – FB/TE
Steven Lakalaka – RB
Diocemy Saint Juste – RB
Davasyia Hagger – TE
Dakota Torres – TE
Russell Williams Jr. – LB
Beau Riley – QB

RB
Paul Harris
Melvin Davis

Special teams
PK Rigoberto Sanchez
PK Mauro Bondi
P Rigoberto Sanchez
P Alex Trifonovich
KR Paul Harris
PR Quinton Pedroza
LS Brian Hitner
H Ikaika Woolsey
