= 2015 Utah State Aggies football team =

American college football season

2015 Utah State Aggies football

Famous Idaho Potato Bowl, L 21–23 vs. Akron
- Conference: Mountain West Conference
- Mountain Division
- Record: 6–7 (5–3 MW)
- Head coach: Matt Wells (3rd season)
- Offensive coordinator: Josh Heupel (1st season)
- Offensive scheme: Spread
- Defensive coordinator: Kevin Clune (1st season)
- Base defense: 3–4
- Home stadium: Maverik Stadium

2015 Mountain West Conference football standings
	Conf.			Overall
Team	W		L	W		L
Mountain Division
Air Force x	6	–	2	8	–	6
New Mexico	5	–	3	7	–	6
Utah State	5	–	3	6	–	7
Boise State	5	–	3	9	–	4
Colorado State	5	–	3	7	–	6
Wyoming	2	–	6	2	–	10
West Division
San Diego State x$	8	–	0	11	–	3
Nevada	4	–	4	7	–	6
San Jose State	4	–	4	6	–	7
Fresno State	2	–	6	3	–	9
UNLV	2	–	6	3	–	9
Hawaii	0	–	8	3	–	10
Championship: San Diego State 27, Air Force 24
$ – Conference champion; x – Division champion/co-champions; Rankings from AP Poll

The 2015 Utah State Aggies football team represented Utah State University in the 2015 NCAA Division I FBS football season. The Aggies were led by third-year head coach Matt Wells and played their home games at Merlin Olsen Field at Maverik Stadium. This was Utah State's third season as members of the Mountain West Conference in the Mountain Division. They finished the season 6–7, 5–3 in Mountain West play to finish in a four-way tie for second place in the Mountain Division. They were invited to the Famous Idaho Potato Bowl where they lost to Akron.

== Before the season ==
=== 2015 recruits ===
College recruiting (2015)
Name	Hometown	School	Height	Weight	Commit date
Chad Artist; WR	Logan, Utah	Logan HS	6 ft 3 in (1.91 m)	180 lb (82 kg)	Jun 30, 2014
Chad Artist; WR	Recruit ratings: Scout: Rivals: 247Sports: ESPN: (72)				
Viliamu Auwae; OL	Kapolei, Hawaii	Kapolei HS	6 ft 5 in (1.96 m)	265 lb (120 kg)	Feb 9, 2015
Viliamu Auwae; OL	Recruit ratings: Scout: 247Sports:				
Wesley Bailey; DB	Huntsville, Ala	J.O. Johnson HS/Eastern Arizona CC	6 ft 2 in (1.88 m)	190 lb (86 kg)	Feb 9, 2015
Wesley Bailey; DB	Recruit ratings: Scout: 247Sports:				
Dalton Baker; TE	Payson, Utah	Payson HS	6 ft 4 in (1.93 m)	235 lb (107 kg)	Jan 30, 2015
Dalton Baker; TE	Recruit ratings: Scout: 247Sports:				
Gerold Bright; WR	Pensacola, Florida	Escambia HS	5 ft 11 in (1.80 m)	175 lb (79 kg)	Jan 30, 2015
Gerold Bright; WR	Recruit ratings: Scout: Rivals: 247Sports:				
Preston Brooskby; OL	Peoria, Ariz.	Sunrise Mountain HS/Glendale CC	6 ft 5 in (1.96 m)	290 lb (130 kg)	Dec 16, 2014
Preston Brooskby; OL	Recruit ratings: Scout: Rivals: 247Sports:				
Chris Copier; TE	South Jordan, Utah	Bingham HS/Snow College	6 ft 6 in (1.98 m)	250 lb (110 kg)	Dec 13, 2014
Chris Copier; TE	Recruit ratings: Scout: Rivals: 247Sports:				
Cameron Haney; CB	Los Angeles	Cathedral HS	5 ft 11 in (1.80 m)	175 lb (79 kg)	Feb 9, 2015
Cameron Haney; CB	Recruit ratings: Scout: Rivals: 247Sports: ESPN: (71)				
Jude Hockel; OL	Walnut Creek, California	Northgate HS/Diablo Valley JC	6 ft 5 in (1.96 m)	295 lb (134 kg)	Jan 30, 2015
Jude Hockel; OL	Recruit ratings: Scout: 247Sports:				
Harris LaChance; DE	Herriman, Utah	Herriman HS	6 ft 7 in (2.01 m)	235 lb (107 kg)	Jan 30, 2015
Harris LaChance; DE	Recruit ratings: Scout: 247Sports:				
Daniel Langi; LB	South Jordan, Utah	Bingham HS	6 ft 0 in (1.83 m)	220 lb (100 kg)	Jan 30, 2015
Daniel Langi; LB	Recruit ratings: Scout: Rivals: 247Sports:				
Dallin Leavitt; S	Portland, Ore.	Central Catholic HS/BYU	5 ft 11 in (1.80 m)	200 lb (91 kg)	
Dallin Leavitt; S	Recruit ratings: No ratings found				
Devante Mays; RB	Livingston, Texas	Livingston HS/Blinn JC	5 ft 11 in (1.80 m)	225 lb (102 kg)	Jan 30, 2015
Devante Mays; RB	Recruit ratings: Scout: 247Sports:				
Wade Meacham; OL	Layton, Utah	Layton HS	6 ft 6 in (1.98 m)	260 lb (120 kg)	Feb 9, 2015
Wade Meacham; OL	Recruit ratings: Scout: 247Sports: ESPN: (73)				
Joe Riggins; LB	Fort Lauderdale, Florida	Cardinal Gibbons HS	6 ft 2 in (1.88 m)	205 lb (93 kg)	Feb 9, 2015
Joe Riggins; LB	Recruit ratings: Scout: Rivals: 247Sports:				
Cade Smith; QB	Salem, Ore.	West Salem HS	6 ft 2 in (1.88 m)	205 lb (93 kg)	Dec 5, 2014
Cade Smith; QB	Recruit ratings: Scout: Rivals: 247Sports:				
Mason Tobek; LB	Puyallup, Washington	Cascade Christian HS	6 ft 3 in (1.91 m)	225 lb (102 kg)	Oct 6, 2014
Mason Tobek; LB	Recruit ratings: Scout: Rivals: 247Sports:				
Ben Wysocki; OL	Seal Beach, California	Los Alamitos HS/UCLA	6 ft 4 in (1.93 m)	285 lb (129 kg)	
Ben Wysocki; OL	Recruit ratings: No ratings found				
Overall recruit ranking: ESPN: Not Ranked Top 25
Note: In many cases, Scout, Rivals, 247Sports, On3, and ESPN may conflict in their listings of height and weight.; In these cases, the average was taken. ESPN grades are on a 100-point scale.; Sources: "Utah State 2015 Football Commitments". Rivals.; "2015 Utah State Football Commits". Scout.; "2015 Player Commits". ESPN.; "Scout.com Team Recruiting Rankings". Scout.; "2015 Team Ranking". Rivals.com.

=== Departures ===
The Aggies lost both their Defensive and offensive coordinators (DC Todd Orlando to Houston and OC Kevin McGiven to Oregon State)

Among notable player losses to graduation were S Brian Suite, LB Zach Vigil, DE B.J. Larsen, WR Ronald Butler, and OL Kevin Whimpey. Another notable loss was QB Darrel Garretson announcing that he would be transferring to Oregon State University.

On June 29, it was announced that Bruce "JoJo" Natson was released from the team for violation of unspecified team rules.

== Maverik Stadium upgrades ==
On May 18, 2015, demolition began on the west side of Maverik Stadium to make way for a new concourse, press box, and luxury box complex. Construction lasted throughout the season, and as a result, the stadium's capacity was temporarily reduced.

== Roster ==
2015 Utah State Aggies football team roster
Players
Coaches
Offense

Pos.	#	Name	Class
QB	2	Kent Myers	So
WR	3	Devonte Robinson	Sr
WR	4	Hunter Sharp	Sr
QB	5	Cade Smith	Fr
QB	6	DJ Nelson	Fr
RB	7	Tonny Lindsey	So
QB	8	Damion Hobbs	So
WR	9	Jaren Colston-Green	So
WR	10	David Senior (Transfer)	So
WR	11	Brandon Swindall	Sr
WR	14	Chad Artist	Fr
WR	15	Hudson Conrad	Fr
QB	16	Chuckie Keeton (injured)	Sr
WR	19	Brandon O'Donnell	Fr
RB	21	LaJuan Hunt	So
WR	25	Gerold Bright	Fr
RB	26	Kennedy Williams	Jr
RB	29	Aarron Franklin	Fr
RB	32	Devante Mays	Jr
TE	33	Joe Palange	Jr
RB	34	Justen Hervey	Fr
TE	44	Landon Horne	Jr
TE	47	Paul Pauni	Fr
OL	54	Ben Wysocki	Sr
OL	55	Andrew Chen	So
OC	59	Austin Stephens	Jr
OL	60	Andrew Markosian	Fr
OL	61	Tyler Saltmarsh	Fr
OL	64	Jarom Ioane	So
OL	65	Austin Albrecht	Jr
OL	66	KJ Uluave	Fr
OL	67	Brandon Taukeiaho	So
OL	68	Dalton Forsythe	Jr
OL	69	Roderick Smith	Fr
OL	72	Tyshon Mosley	So
OL	73	Preston Brooksby	Jr
OL	74	Jude Hockel	Jr
OL	75	Taani Fisilau	Sr
OL	76	Jake Simonich	Jr
OL	78	Cody Boyer	Fr
WR	80	Tyler Fox	Fr
WR	81	Zach Van Leeuwen	Fr
WR	82	Andrew Rodriguez	Jr
TE	83	Wyatt Houston	Jr
WR	84	Ethan Cortazzo	Jr
TE	85	Chris Copier	Jr
TE	86	Dalton Baker	Fr
TE	87	Dax Raymond	Fr
WR	88	Braelon Roberts	So

Defense

Pos.	#	Name	Class
CB	1	Daniel Gray	Jr
CB	2	Marquan Ellison	Jr
SS	2	Dallin Leavitt (Transfer)	Jr
LB	5	LT Filiaga	Sr
CB	6	Cameron Haney	Fr
LB	9	Kyler Fackrell	Sr
SS	10	Kelvin Lee	Sr
LB	12	Alex Huerta	So
CB	13	Jalen Davis	So
LB	14	Joe Riggins	Fr
CB	15	Tyler Floyd	Sr
LB	16	Anthony Williams	Sr
CB	17	Deshane Hines	Sr
LB	18	Chasen Andersen	Fr
LB	19	Ian Togiai	So
LB	20	Brock Carmen	Jr
CB	22	Bryant Hayes	Sr
LB	23	Michael Okonkwo	Sr
SS	24	Marwin Evans	Sr
CB	26	Kevin Ogwu	So
FS	27	Jontrell Rocquemore	Fr
SS	28	Aaron Wade	Fr
FS	29	Myron Turner	So
CB	30	Promise Amadi	Sr
S	30	Gage Ferguson	So
CB	31	Jentz Painter	Jr
FS	37	Devin Centers	Jr
S	38	Cole Casper	Fr
LB	39	Torrey Green	Sr
CB	40	Austin Cheney	Jr
LB	41	Nick Vigil	Jr
LB	42	La'Bradford Harold	Sr
LB	45	Jarom Baldomero	Sr
LB	46	Mason Tobeck	Fr
LB	48	Chase Christiansen	Fr
LB	49	Derek Larsen	Fr
DE	50	Ryan Garrett	Fr
NG	51	David Moala	Sr
DE	52	John Taylor (injured)	Sr
LB	53	Braden Harris	Fr
NG	56	Gasetoto Schuster	Fr
DE	90	Clark Jeppesen	So
DE	91	Siua Taufa	Jr
DL	93	Jacoby Wildman	Fr
DE	94	Eric Berntson	Jr
DE	95	Ricky Ali'ifua	Jr
DE	96	Christopher 'Unga	Fr
DE	97	Jordan Nielsen	Sr
DE	98	Edmund Faimalo (injured)	Jr

Special teams

Pos.	#	Name	Class
K	36	Jake Thompson	Jr
LS	47	Mark Hutchinson	Sr
LS	58	Salanoa Galea'i	Sr
PK	62	Dominik Eberle	Fr
PK	63	Brock Warren	Jr
P	89	Aaron Dalton	Fr
P	92	Zach Lee	Fr

Head coach

- Matt Wells (Utah State)

Coordinators/assistant coaches

- Mark Weber (Idaho State)
  Associate head coach/offensive line
- Josh Heupel (Oklahoma)
  Assistant head coach/offensive coordinator/QB
- Kevin Clune (Cal State Fullerton)
  Defensive coordinator/linebackers
- Dave Ungerer (Southern Connecticut)
  Special teams coordinator/running backs
- Luke Wells (Oklahoma)
  Co-offensive coordinator/TE's/recruiting coordinator
- Jovon Bouknight (Wyoming)
  Passing game coordinator/wide receivers
- Joe Lorig (Western Oregon)
  Safeties
- Ikaika Malloe (Washington)
  Defensive line
- Kendrick Shaver (Missouri State)
  Defensive passing game coordinator/cornerbacks

Legend

- (C) Team captain
- (S) Suspended
- (I) Ineligible
- Injured
- Redshirt

Roster

== Schedule ==
Date	Time	Opponent	Site	TV	Result	Attendance
September 3	7:00 pm	Southern Utah*	Maverik Stadium; Logan, UT		W 12–9	21,209
September 11	7:00 pm	at No. 24 Utah*	Rice-Eccles Stadium; Salt Lake City, UT (Beehive Boot & Battle of the Brothers)	ESPN2	L 14–24	46,011
September 19	3:00 pm	at Washington*	Husky Stadium; Seattle, WA	P12N	L 17–31	59,464
October 3	5:00 pm	Colorado State†	Maverik Stadium; Logan, UT	ESPN3	W 33–18	22,059
October 10	8:30 pm	at Fresno State	Bulldog Stadium; Fresno, CA	CBSSN	W 56–14	30,540
October 16	7:00 pm	No. 21 Boise State	Maverik Stadium; Logan, UT	CBSSN	W 52–26	22,509
October 23	8:30 pm	at San Diego State	Qualcomm Stadium; San Diego, CA	ESPN2	L 14–48	25,898
October 30	8:15 pm	Wyoming	Maverik Stadium; Logan, UT (Bridger's Battle)	ESPN2	W 58–27	20,964
November 7	1:30 pm	at New Mexico	University Stadium; Albuquerque, NM	CBSSN	L 13–14	19,886
November 14	12:00 pm	at Air Force	Falcon Stadium; Colorado Springs, CO	ESPN3	L 28–35	20,083
November 21	1:30 pm	Nevada	Maverik Stadium; Logan, UT	ESPN3	W 31–27	18,922
November 28	1:30 pm	BYU*	Maverik Stadium; Logan, UT (Beehive Boot & The Old Wagon Wheel)	CBSSN	L 28–51	22,509
December 22	1:30 pm	vs. Akron*	Albertsons Stadium; Boise, ID (Famous Idaho Potato Bowl)	ESPN	L 21–23	18,876
*Non-conference game; Rankings from AP Poll released prior to game; All times are in Mountain time

Schedule source:

== Game summaries ==
=== Southern Utah ===
Utah State v Southern Utah

Team	1	2	3	4	Total
Thunderbirds	6	3	0	0	9
• Aggies	5	0	0	7	12

- Date: September 3
- Location: Maverik Stadium
- Game start: 7:00 pm MST
- Elapsed time: 3:22
- Game attendance: 21,209
- Referee: Brad Van Vark

=== At Utah ===
Battle of the Brothers

Team	1	2	3	4	Total
Aggies	0	14	0	0	14
• Utes	7	7	7	3	24

- Date: September 11
- Location: Rice-Eccles Stadium
- Game start: 7:00 pm MST
- Game attendance: 46,011

=== At Washington ===
Utah State at Washington

Team	1	2	3	4	Total
Aggies	0	10	0	7	17
• Huskies	3	14	14	0	31

- Date: September 19
- Location: Husky Stadium
- Game start: 3:00 p.m. MST
- Game attendance: 59,464

=== Colorado State ===
Utah State v Colorado State

Team	1	2	3	4	Total
Rams	3	7	0	8	18
• Aggies	3	14	6	10	33

- Date: October 3
- Location: Maverik Stadium
- Game start: 5:00 p.m. MST
- Game attendance: 22,059

=== At Fresno State ===
Utah State at Fresno State

Team	1	2	3	4	Total
• Aggies	7	22	14	13	56
Bulldogs	7	0	0	7	14

- Date: October 10
- Location: Bulldog Stadium
- Game start: 8:30 p.m. MST
- Game attendance: 30,540

=== Boise State ===
Utah State v Boise State

Team	1	2	3	4	Total
#21 Broncos	3	7	7	9	26
• Aggies	17	28	7	0	52

- Date: October 16
- Location: Maverik Stadium
- Game start: 7:00 p.m. MST
- Game attendance: 22,509

The Aggies' victory over the Broncos marked not only the first win over Boise State since 1997, but also the first home victory over a ranked opponent since defeating Fresno State in 1991.

=== At San Diego State ===
Utah State at San Diego State

Team	1	2	3	4	Total
Aggies	0	7	7	0	14
• Aztecs	17	17	0	14	48

- Date: October 23
- Location: Qualcomm Stadium
- Game attendance: 25,898

=== Wyoming ===
Bridger's Battle

Team	1	2	3	4	Total
Cowboys	7	7	7	6	27
• Aggies	14	16	7	21	58

- Date: October 30
- Location: Maverik Stadium
- Game attendance: 20,964

=== At New Mexico ===
Utah State at New Mexico

Team	1	2	3	4	Total
Aggies	0	3	7	3	13
• Lobos	0	7	7	0	14

- Date: November 7
- Location: University Stadium
- Game attendance: 19,886

=== At Air Force ===
Utah State at Air Force

Team	1	2	3	4	Total
Aggies	14	0	14	0	28
• Falcons	14	7	14	0	35

- Date: November 14
- Location: Falcon Stadium
- Game attendance: 20,083

=== Nevada ===
Utah State v Nevada

Team	1	2	3	4	Total
Wolf Pack	7	14	6	0	27
• Aggies	0	7	14	10	31

- Date: November 21
- Location: Maverik Stadium
- Game attendance: 18,922

=== BYU ===
The Old Wagon Wheel

Team	1	2	3	4	Total
• Cougars	10	14	14	13	51
Aggies	7	14	0	7	28

- Date: November 28
- Location: Maverik Stadium
- Game attendance: 22,509

=== Akron–Famous Idaho Potato Bowl ===
Famous Idaho Potato Bowl

Team	1	2	3	4	Total
• Zips	7	6	7	3	23
Aggies	0	7	7	7	21

- Date: December 22
- Location: Albertson Stadium
- Game attendance: 18,876
