= 2015 New Mexico Lobos football team =

American college football season

2015 New Mexico Lobos football

New Mexico Bowl, L 37–45 vs. Arizona
- Conference: Mountain West Conference
- Mountain Division
- Record: 7–6 (5–3 MW)
- Head coach: Bob Davie (4th season)
- Offensive coordinator: Bob DeBesse (4th season)
- Offensive scheme: Multiple pistol
- Defensive coordinator: Kevin Cosgrove (2nd season)
- Base defense: 3–4
- Home stadium: University Stadium

2015 Mountain West Conference football standings
	Conf.			Overall
Team	W		L	W		L
Mountain Division
Air Force x	6	–	2	8	–	6
New Mexico	5	–	3	7	–	6
Utah State	5	–	3	6	–	7
Boise State	5	–	3	9	–	4
Colorado State	5	–	3	7	–	6
Wyoming	2	–	6	2	–	10
West Division
San Diego State x$	8	–	0	11	–	3
Nevada	4	–	4	7	–	6
San Jose State	4	–	4	6	–	7
Fresno State	2	–	6	3	–	9
UNLV	2	–	6	3	–	9
Hawaii	0	–	8	3	–	10
Championship: San Diego State 27, Air Force 24
$ – Conference champion; x – Division champion/co-champions; Rankings from AP Poll

The 2015 New Mexico Lobos football team represented the University of New Mexico as a member of the Mountain Division in the Mountain West Conference (MW) during the 2015 NCAA Division I FBS football season. Led by fourth-year head coach Bob Davie, the Lobos compiled an overall record of 7–6 with a mark of 5–3 in conference play, placing in a four-way tie for second in the MW's Mountain Division. New Mexico was invited to the New Mexico Bowl, where the Lobos lost to Arizona. The team played home games at University Stadium in Albuquerque, New Mexico.

== Schedule ==
Date	Time	Opponent	Site	TV	Result	Attendance
September 5	6:00 p.m.	Mississippi Valley State*	University Stadium; Albuquerque, NM		W 66–0	21,930
September 12	6:00 p.m.	Tulsa*	University Stadium; Albuquerque, NM	ESPN3	L 21–40	24,167
September 18	8:00 p.m.	at Arizona State*	Sun Devil Stadium; Tempe, AZ	P12N	L 10–34	43,310
September 26	1:00 p.m.	at Wyoming	War Memorial Stadium; Laramie, WY	RTRM	W 38–28	18,723
October 3	6:00 p.m.	New Mexico State*	University Stadium; Albuquerque, NM (Rio Grande Rivalry)	RTRM	W 38–29	30,900
October 10	5:00 p.m.	at Nevada	Mackay Stadium; Reno, NV	MW Net	L 17–35	20,426
October 17	5:00 p.m.	Hawaii^{†}	University Stadium; Albuquerque, NM	RTRM	W 28–27	20,541
October 24	5:00 p.m.	at San Jose State	Spartan Stadium; San Jose, CA	RTRM	L 21–31	11,646
November 7	1:30 p.m.	Utah State	University Stadium; Albuquerque, NM	CBSSN	W 14–13	19,886
November 14	8:15 p.m.	at Boise State	Albertsons Stadium; Boise, ID	ESPNU	W 31–24	32,780
November 21	3:30 p.m.	Colorado State	University Stadium; Albuquerque, NM	RTRM	L 21–28	21,643
November 28	8:15 p.m.	Air Force	University Stadium; Albuquerque, NM	ESPNU	W 47–35	18,868
December 19	12:00 p.m.	Arizona*	University Stadium; Albuquerque, NM (New Mexico Bowl, rivalry)	ESPN	L 37–45	30,289
*Non-conference game; ^{†}Homecoming; All times are in Mountain time

== Game summaries ==
=== Mississippi Valley State ===
	1	2	3	4	Total
Delta Devils	0	0	0	0	0
Lobos	21	17	21	7	66

=== Tulsa ===
	1	2	3	4	Total
Golden Hurricane	10	10	10	10	40
Lobos	14	0	7	0	21

=== At Arizona State ===
	1	2	3	4	Total
Lobos	0	0	10	0	10
Sun Devils	0	10	14	10	34

=== At Wyoming ===
	1	2	3	4	Total
Lobos	14	14	7	3	38
Cowboys	0	14	7	7	28

=== New Mexico State ===
	1	2	3	4	Total
Aggies	17	9	3	0	29
Lobos	14	0	15	9	38

=== At Nevada ===
	1	2	3	4	Total
Lobos	3	7	0	7	17
Wolf Pack	0	14	7	14	35

=== Hawaii ===
	1	2	3	4	Total
Rainbow Warriors	10	14	0	3	27
Lobos	7	7	7	7	28

=== At San Jose State ===
	1	2	3	4	Total
Lobos	7	7	0	7	21
Spartans	7	14	7	3	31

=== Utah State ===
	1	2	3	4	Total
Aggies	0	3	7	3	13
Lobos	0	7	7	0	14

=== At Boise State ===
	1	2	3	4	Total
Lobos	7	7	3	14	31
Broncos	0	3	7	14	24

=== Colorado State ===
	1	2	3	4	Total
Rams	14	3	3	8	28
Lobos	7	7	7	0	21

=== Air Force ===
	1	2	3	4	Total
Falcons	7	7	7	14	35
Lobos	14	17	3	13	47

=== Arizona—New Mexico Bowl ===
	1	2	3	4	Total
Wildcats	7	21	14	3	45
Lobos	3	14	14	6	37

== Roster ==
2015 New Mexico Lobos football team roster
Players
Coaches
Offense

Pos.	#	Name	Class
WR	2	Dameon Gamblin	Jr
RB	3	Richard McQuarley	So
RB	4	Romell Jordan	RSo
WR	5	Patrick Reed	RFr
RB	6	Jhurell Pressley	RSr
RB	7	Teriyon Gipson	Jr
TE	8	Cole Gautsche	Sr
WR	9	Q' Drennan	Fr
QB	10	Austin Apodaca	RJr
WR	11	Ridge Jones	RJr
QB	13	Lamar Jordan	RSo
QB	14	Caleb Kimbro	RSo
QB	16	Derek Martinez	Fr
QB	17	JaJuan Lawson	RFr
WR	18	Marcus Lopez	RSo
WR	19	Matt Quarells	RFr
RB	20	Daryl Chestnut	So
WR	22	Chris Davis Jr.	So
WR	23	Thomas Vieira	Fr
WR	24	Carlos Wiggins	Sr
RB	25	David Anaya	Sr
RB	26	Tyrone Owens	RFr
RB	28	Diquon Woodhouse	RFr
RB	30	Wendell Carter	RSr
RB	35	Javohn Jones	Fr
WR	38	James McNeely	RFr
TE	46	Michael Walsh	RJr
TE	48	Chris Edling	Sr
OL	50	Chris Lewis	Jr
OL	51	Eden Mahina	Sr
OL	55	Aaron Jenkins	RFr
OL	56	Johnny Vizcaíno	RJr
OL	59	Toye Adewon	RSo
OL	61	Darian Allen	RJr
OL	62	Garrett Adcock	RJr
OL	64	Jack Lamm	RJr
OL	65	Jack Ziltz	Jr
OL	66	Tevita Fonua	Jr
OL	67	Andrew Aqua	RJr
OL	69	Beau Hott	Fr
OL	70	Luis Torres	Fr
OL	74	Izrael Castellanos	Fr
OL	75	Reno Henderson	RJr
OL	76	Dillon Romine	RSr
OL	77	Charlie Grammel	Fr
OL	79	Bryan Oldenkamp	RSr
TE	80	Reece White	Sr
WR	81	Marquis Bundy	Sr
WR	82	Delane Hart-Johnson	So
WR	83	Jacob Willcox	RFr
TE	84	Erik Beilman	Fr
TE	85	Aaron Overacker	Fr
TE	86	David Georges	RSr
WR	87	Anu Somoye	Fr
TE	88	Nick Lehman	Jr

Defense

Pos.	#	Name	Class
LB	2	Kimmie Carson	RSo
CB	3	Cranston Jones	Sr
CB	4	Isaiah "I.B." Brown	Jr
S	5	Lee Crosby	RJr
S	6	Travis Green	GS
CB	7	Blair Manly	Fr
S	8	Ricky Bennett	RSo
LB	9	Richard Winston	Sr
S	12	Ryan Santos	RJr
S	14	Daniel Henry	RJr
S	15	John Russo	RJr
S	16	Jacob Girgle	Jr
CB	19	Nias Martin	Jr
LB	20	Ryan Langford	Sr
CB	21	Donnie Duncan	RSr
S	22	Markel Byrd	RSo
S	23	Tayo Adewon	RSr
CB	26	Marquez Mackey	So
CB	27	Bijon Parker	RFr
S	28	Jake Rothschiller	RSo
LB	29	Kenya Donaldson	RJr
LB	32	Michael Arredondo	Sr
LB	33	Alex Hart	Fr
LB	34	Geoff Smelser	RSo
S	35	Kenneth Maxwell	Jr
S	38	Derek Salas	RFr
LB	41	Steven Galvan	RFr
LB	47	Austin Ocasio	Jr
LB	49	Dakota Cox	Jr
LB	51	Elliot Hersman	Fr
DL	52	Sam Mabany	RSo
DL	53	Cody Baker	Fr
LB	54	Donnie White	Jr
DL	55	Taylor Timmons	RJr
LB	56	Micah McVaney	Fr
DL	57	Everett Powell	Jr
LB	58	Maurice Daniels	Jr
DL	59	Chris Lee	Sr
DL	74	Christopher Smalls	RSr
LB	89	Dyson Chmura	Fr
DL	90	Ewing Simmons	Jr
DL	91	Nik D'Avanzo	Jr
DL	92	William Udeh	Jr
DL	95	Garrett Hughes	So
DL	96	Johnny Williams	Jr
DL	98	Kene Okonkwo	So

Special teams

Pos.	#	Name	Class
P	12	Jacob Perez	Fr
P	90	Zack Rogers	RSr
P	94	Sam Gentry	RJr
K	95	Jason Sanders	So
LS	97	Steven Romero	RJr

Head coach

- Bob Davie

Coordinators/assistant coaches

- Bob DeBesse – Offensive Coordinator/Quarterbacks
- Kevin Cosgrove – Defensive Coordinator/Linebackers
- Apollo Wright – Special Teams Coordinator / RBs
- Charles McMillian – Defensive Passing Game Coordiantor / Safeties
- Scott Baumgartner – Wide Receivers
- Clay Davie – Tight Ends
- Jason Lenzmeier – Offensive Line
- Barry Sacks – Defensive Line
- Al Simmons – Cornerbacks
- LaMar Bratton – Offensive Graduate Assistant
- Mitchell Kleinschrodt – Offensive Graduate Assistant
- Andrew Aho – Defensive Graduate Assistant
- Ivan Cordova – Defensive Graduate Assistant
- Brian DeSpain – Director of Football Operations
- Evan Barker – Asst. Director of Football Operations
- Josh Sternquist – Director of Football Recruiting
- Trent Martin – Director of Player Development
- Ben Hilgart – Director of Athletic Performance
- Kyle Kudrna – Asst. Director of Athletic Performance

Legend

- (C) Team captain
- (S) Suspended
- (I) Ineligible
- Injured
- Redshirt

Roster
