= Darius Powe =

American football player (born 1994)

No. 80
- Position: Wide receiver

Personal information
- Born: March 15, 1994 (age 32); Lakewood, California, U.S.
- Listed height: 6 ft 2 in (1.88 m)
- Listed weight: 218 lb (99 kg)

Career information
- High school: Lakewood
- College: California
- NFL draft: 2016: undrafted

Career history
- New York Giants (2016–2017)

Career NFL statistics
- Receptions: 2
- Receiving yards: 13
- Receiving touchdowns: 0
- Stats at Pro Football Reference

Darius Powe (born March 15, 1994) is an American former professional football player who was a wide receiver in the National Football League (NFL). He played college football for the California Golden Bears.

== Professional career ==
Powe signed with the New York Giants as an undrafted free agent on May 6, 2016.

He was waived by the Giants on September 3, 2016 and was signed to the practice squad the next day.

After spending his entire rookie season on the practice squad, Powe signed a future contract with the Giants on January 9, 2017.

On August 23, 2017, Powe was waived/injured by the Giants and placed on injured reserve. He was released on August 29, 2017. He was re-signed to the Giants' practice squad on October 9, 2017.

He was promoted to the active roster on December 6, 2017. He made his NFL debut the following week, recording two catches for 13 yards before suffering a broken foot. He was placed on injured reserve on December 11, 2017.

He was waived by the Giants on April 23, 2018 after the acquisition punter Riley Dixon.
