= 2015 San Diego State Aztecs football team =

American college football season

2015 San Diego State Aztecs football

Mountain West champion MW West Division champion Hawaii Bowl champion

MW Championship Game, W 27–24 vs. Air Force

Hawaii Bowl, W 42–7 vs. Cincinnati
- Conference: Mountain West Conference
- West Division
- Record: 11–3 (8–0 MW)
- Head coach: Rocky Long (5th season)
- Offensive coordinator: Jeff Horton (1st season)
- Offensive scheme: Pro-style
- Base defense: 3–3–5
- Home stadium: Qualcomm Stadium

2015 Mountain West Conference football standings
	Conf.			Overall
Team	W		L	W		L
Mountain Division
Air Force x	6	–	2	8	–	6
New Mexico	5	–	3	7	–	6
Utah State	5	–	3	6	–	7
Boise State	5	–	3	9	–	4
Colorado State	5	–	3	7	–	6
Wyoming	2	–	6	2	–	10
West Division
San Diego State x$	8	–	0	11	–	3
Nevada	4	–	4	7	–	6
San Jose State	4	–	4	6	–	7
Fresno State	2	–	6	3	–	9
UNLV	2	–	6	3	–	9
Hawaii	0	–	8	3	–	10
Championship: San Diego State 27, Air Force 24
$ – Conference champion; x – Division champion/co-champions; Rankings from AP Poll

The 2015 San Diego State Aztecs football team represented San Diego State University in the 2015 NCAA Division I FBS football season. The Aztecs were led by fifth-year head coach Rocky Long and played their home games at Qualcomm Stadium. They were members of the West Division of the Mountain West Conference. They finished the season 11–3, 8–0 in Mountain West play to become West Division Champions. They represented the West Division in the Mountain West Championship Game where they defeated Mountain Division representative Air Force to be crowned Mountain West champions. They were invited to the Hawaii Bowl where they defeated Cincinnati.

== Schedule ==
Date	Time	Opponent	Site	TV	Result	Attendance
September 5	5:00 p.m.	San Diego*	Qualcomm Stadium; San Diego, CA		W 37–3	48,785
September 12	2:00 p.m.	at California*	California Memorial Stadium; Berkeley, CA	P12N	L 7–35	50,830
September 19	5:00 p.m.	South Alabama*	Qualcomm Stadium; San Diego, CA		L 27–34 ^{OT}	18,194
September 26	12:30 p.m.	at Penn State*	Beaver Stadium; University Park, PA	BTN	L 21–37	95,107
October 3	7:30 p.m.	Fresno State	Qualcomm Stadium; San Diego, CA (rivalry)	CBSSN	W 21–7	29,996
October 10	6:00 p.m.	at Hawaii	Aloha Stadium; Halawa, HI	TWCS	W 28–14	28,543
October 17	7:30 p.m.	at San Jose State	Spartan Stadium; San Jose, CA	ESPNU	W 30–7	16,339
October 23	7:30 p.m.	Utah State	Qualcomm Stadium; San Diego, CA	ESPN2	W 48–14	25,898
October 31	12:30 p.m.	at Colorado State	Hughes Stadium; Fort Collins, CO	CBSSN	W 41–17	18,125
November 14	7:30 p.m.	Wyoming^{†}	Qualcomm Stadium; San Diego, CA	CBSSN	W 38–3	36,688
November 21	7:30 p.m.	at UNLV	Sam Boyd Stadium; Whitney, NV	CBSSN	W 52–14	14,738
November 28	7:45 p.m.	Nevada	Qualcomm Stadium; San Diego, CA	ESPN2	W 31–14	22,939
December 5	4:30 p.m.	Air Force	Qualcomm Stadium; San Diego, CA (Mountain West Conference Championship Game)	ESPN2	W 27–24	20,959
December 24	5:00 p.m.	vs. Cincinnati	Aloha Stadium; Halawa, HI (Hawaii Bowl)	ESPN	W 42–7	14,537
*Non-conference game; ^{†}Homecoming; All times are in Pacific time

== Game summaries ==
=== San Diego ===
	1	2	3	4	Total
Toreros	0	0	3	0	3
Aztecs	14	6	7	10	37

=== At California ===
	1	2	3	4	Total
Aztecs	7	0	0	0	7
Golden Bears	0	14	14	7	35

=== South Alabama ===
	1	2	3	4	OT	Total
Jaguars	3	7	7	10	7	34
Aztecs	0	17	3	7	0	27

=== At Penn State ===
	1	2	3	4	Total
Aztecs	7	7	7	0	21
Nittany Lions	10	17	0	10	37

=== Fresno State ===
	1	2	3	4	Total
Bulldogs	0	7	0	0	7
Aztecs	0	7	7	7	21

=== At Hawaii ===
	1	2	3	4	Total
Aztecs	14	7	0	7	28
Rainbow Warriors	0	7	7	0	14

=== At San Jose State ===
	1	2	3	4	Total
Aztecs	7	10	13	0	30
Spartans	0	7	0	0	7

=== Utah State ===
	1	2	3	4	Total
Aggies	0	7	7	0	14
Aztecs	17	17	0	14	48

=== At Colorado State ===
	1	2	3	4	Total
Aztecs	7	6	14	14	41
Rams	7	3	0	7	17

=== Wyoming ===
	1	2	3	4	Total
Cowboys	0	0	0	3	3
Aztecs	14	7	3	14	38

=== At UNLV ===
	1	2	3	4	Total
Aztecs	14	17	14	7	52
Rebels	0	0	14	0	14

=== Nevada ===
	1	2	3	4	Total
Wolf Pack	7	7	0	0	14
Aztecs	14	7	3	7	31

=== Air Force–Mountain West Championship Game ===
	1	2	3	4	Total
Falcons	7	3	7	7	24
Aztecs	0	10	7	10	27

=== Cincinnati–Hawaii Bowl ===
	1	2	3	4	Total
Aztecs	14	7	7	14	42
Bearcats	0	0	0	7	7
