= 2015 San Jose State Spartans football team =

American college football season

2015 San Jose State Spartans football

Cure Bowl champion

Cure Bowl, W 27–16 vs. Georgia State
- Conference: Mountain West Conference
- West Division
- Record: 6–7 (4–4 MW)
- Head coach: Ron Caragher (3rd season)
- Offensive coordinator: Al Borges (1st season)
- Offensive scheme: Multiple
- Defensive coordinator: Greg Robinson (2nd season)
- Base defense: 4–3
- Captains: Tyler Ervin; Wes Schweitzer; Jimmy Pruitt; Christian Tago
- Home stadium: Spartan Stadium

2015 Mountain West Conference football standings
	Conf.			Overall
Team	W		L	W		L
Mountain Division
Air Force x	6	–	2	8	–	6
New Mexico	5	–	3	7	–	6
Utah State	5	–	3	6	–	7
Boise State	5	–	3	9	–	4
Colorado State	5	–	3	7	–	6
Wyoming	2	–	6	2	–	10
West Division
San Diego State x$	8	–	0	11	–	3
Nevada	4	–	4	7	–	6
San Jose State	4	–	4	6	–	7
Fresno State	2	–	6	3	–	9
UNLV	2	–	6	3	–	9
Hawaii	0	–	8	3	–	10
Championship: San Diego State 27, Air Force 24
$ – Conference champion; x – Division champion/co-champions; Rankings from AP Poll

The 2015 San Jose State Spartans football team represented San Jose State University in the 2015 NCAA Division I FBS football season. The Spartans were led by third-year head coach Ron Caragher and played their home games at Spartan Stadium. They were members of the Mountain West Conference in the West Division. They finished the season 6–7, 4–4 in Mountain West play to finish in a tie for second place in the West Division. Though they finished 5–7 in the regular season, they qualified for a bowl berth due to having the third-highest eligible Academic Progress Rate (APR) after only 77 of the 80 bids for a bowl were filled. This was San Jose's first bowl berth since 2012. The Spartans defeated Georgia State 27–16 to win the inaugural Cure Bowl.

== Schedule ==
Date	Time	Opponent	Site	TV	Result	Attendance
September 3	7:00 pm	No. 9 (FCS) New Hampshire*	Spartan Stadium; San Jose, CA		W 43–13	15,198
September 12	7:15 pm	at Air Force	Falcon Stadium; Colorado Springs, CO	ESPNU	L 16–37	22,389
September 19	5:00 pm	at Oregon State*	Reser Stadium; Corvallis, OR	P12N	L 21–35	34,573
September 26	7:30 pm	Fresno State	Spartan Stadium; San Jose, CA (Valley Trophy)	CBSSN	W 49–23	17,264
October 3	1:00 pm	at Auburn*	Jordan–Hare Stadium; Auburn, AL	SECN	L 21–35	87,451
October 10	6:00 pm	at UNLV	Sam Boyd Stadium; Whitney, NV	MWN	W 33–27 ^{OT}	19,190
October 17	7:30 pm	San Diego State^{†}	Spartan Stadium; San Jose, CA	ESPNU	L 7–30	16,339
October 24	4:00 pm	New Mexico	Spartan Stadium; San Jose, CA	ROOT	W 31–21	11,646
November 6	8:30 pm	BYU*	Spartan Stadium; San Jose, CA	CBSSN	L 16–17	15,652
November 14	1:00 pm	at Nevada	Mackay Stadium; Reno, NV	MWN	L 34–37 ^{OT}	17,215
November 21	8:00 pm	at Hawaii	Aloha Stadium; Honolulu, HI (Dick Tomey Legacy Game)	Oc 16	W 42–23	20,320
November 27	12:30 pm	Boise State	Spartan Stadium; San Jose, CA	CBSSN	L 23–40	15,770
December 19	4:00 pm	vs. Georgia State*	Orlando Citrus Bowl; Orlando, FL (Cure Bowl)	CBSSN	W 27–16	18,536
*Non-conference game; ^{†}Homecoming; Rankings from AP Poll released prior to game; All times are in Pacific time

Schedule source:

== Game summaries ==
=== New Hampshire ===
	1	2	3	4	Total
Wildcats	0	7	0	6	13
Spartans	20	6	10	7	43

=== At Air Force ===
	1	2	3	4	Total
Spartans	7	0	9	0	16
Falcons	7	7	3	20	37

=== At Oregon State ===
	1	2	3	4	Total
Spartans	7	14	0	0	21
Beavers	7	7	21	0	35

=== Fresno State ===
	1	2	3	4	Total
Bulldogs	0	10	13	0	23
Spartans	14	7	14	14	49

=== At Auburn ===
	1	2	3	4	Total
Spartans	7	0	7	7	21
Tigers	14	7	7	7	35

=== At UNLV ===
	1	2	3	4	OT	Total
Spartans	0	17	3	7	6	33
Rebels	7	3	0	17	0	27

=== San Diego State ===
	1	2	3	4	Total
Aztecs	7	10	13	0	30
Spartans	0	7	0	0	7

=== New Mexico ===
	1	2	3	4	Total
Lobos	7	7	0	7	21
Spartans	7	14	7	3	31

=== BYU ===
	1	2	3	4	Total
Cougars	7	7	0	3	17
Spartans	3	7	0	6	16

=== At Nevada ===
	1	2	3	4	OT	Total
Spartans	0	14	7	10	3	34
Wolf Pack	7	3	7	14	6	37

=== At Hawaii ===
	1	2	3	4	Total
Spartans	21	14	7	0	42
Rainbow Warriors	0	0	14	9	23

=== Boise State ===
	1	2	3	4	Total
Broncos	0	9	7	24	40
Spartans	3	7	0	13	23

=== Georgia State–Cure Bowl ===
	1	2	3	4	Total
Spartans	0	10	3	14	27
Panthers	0	7	0	9	16

== Coaching staff ==
Name	Position	Seasons at San Jose State	Alma mater
Ron Caragher	Head coach	3	UCLA (1990)
Al Borges	Offensive coordinator, quarterbacks	1	Chico State (1981)
Jimmie Dougherty	Assistant head coach, wide receivers, passing game	3	Missouri (2001)
Dan Ferrigno	Special teams, tight ends	1	San Francisco State (1978)
James Jones	Defensive line	3	Texas Southern (1998)
Greg Robinson	Defensive coordinator, linebackers	2	Pacific (1975)
Andrew Rolin	Running backs	3	San Diego (2009)
Joe Staab	Outside linebackers	3	San Diego (2008)
Adam Stenavich	Offensive line	1	Michigan (2006)
Donte Williams	Defensive backs, recruiting coordinator	3	Idaho State (2006)
