= 2015 Wyoming Cowboys football team =

American college football season

2015 Wyoming Cowboys football
- Conference: Mountain West Conference
- Mountain Division
- Record: 2–10 (2–6 MW)
- Head coach: Craig Bohl (2nd season)
- Offensive coordinator: Brent Vigen (2nd season)
- Offensive scheme: Pro-style
- Defensive coordinator: Steve Stanard (2nd season)
- Base defense: 4–3
- Home stadium: War Memorial Stadium

2015 Mountain West Conference football standings
	Conf.			Overall
Team	W		L	W		L
Mountain Division
Air Force x	6	–	2	8	–	6
New Mexico	5	–	3	7	–	6
Utah State	5	–	3	6	–	7
Boise State	5	–	3	9	–	4
Colorado State	5	–	3	7	–	6
Wyoming	2	–	6	2	–	10
West Division
San Diego State x$	8	–	0	11	–	3
Nevada	4	–	4	7	–	6
San Jose State	4	–	4	6	–	7
Fresno State	2	–	6	3	–	9
UNLV	2	–	6	3	–	9
Hawaii	0	–	8	3	–	10
Championship: San Diego State 27, Air Force 24
$ – Conference champion; x – Division champion/co-champions; Rankings from AP Poll

The 2015 Wyoming Cowboys football team represented the University of Wyoming as a member Mountain West Conference (MW) during the 2015 NCAA Division I FBS football season. Led by second-year head coach Craig Bohl, the Cowboys compiled an overall record of 2–10 record with mark 2–6 in conference play, placing last out of six teams in the MW's Mountain Division. The team played home games at War Memorial Stadium in Laramie, Wyoming.

== Schedule ==
Date	Time	Opponent	Site	TV	Result	Attendance
September 5	2:00 p.m.	North Dakota*	War Memorial Stadium; Laramie, WY		L 13–24	23,669
September 12	2:00 p.m.	Eastern Michigan*	War Memorial Stadium; Laramie, WY	RSRM	L 29–48	19,112
September 19	6:30 p.m.	at Washington State*	Martin Stadium; Pullman, WA	P12N	L 14–31	31,105
September 26	1:00 p.m.	New Mexico	War Memorial Stadium; Laramie, WY	RSRM	L 28–38	18,723
October 3	1:30 p.m.	at Appalachian State*	Kidd Brewer Stadium; Boone, NC	ESPN3	L 13–31	19,345
October 10	8:15 p.m.	at Air Force	Falcon Stadium; Colorado Springs, CO	ESPN2	L 17–31	22,023
October 17	1:00 p.m.	Nevada	War Memorial Stadium; Laramie, WY	ESPN3	W 28–21	17,026
October 24	8:15 p.m.	at Boise State	Albertsons Stadium; Boise, ID	ESPN2	L 14–34	31,946
October 30	8:15 p.m.	at Utah State	Maverik Stadium; Logan, UT (rivalry)	ESPN2	L 27–58	20,964
November 7	1:00 p.m.	Colorado State	War Memorial Stadium; Laramie, WY (Border War)	ESPN3	L 7–27	18,682
November 14	8:30 p.m.	at San Diego State	Qualcomm Stadium; San Diego, CA	CBSSN	L 3–38	36,688
November 28	12:00 p.m.	UNLV	War Memorial Stadium; Laramie, WY	RTRM	W 35–28	11,149
*Non-conference game; All times are in Mountain time

== Game summaries ==
=== North Dakota ===
	1	2	3	4	Total
North Dakota	7	7	0	10	24
Cowboys	0	0	0	13	13

=== Eastern Michigan ===
	1	2	3	4	Total
Eagles	14	24	7	3	48
Cowboys	7	7	15	0	29

=== At Washington State ===
	1	2	3	4	Total
Cowboys	14	0	0	0	14
Cougars	7	14	0	10	31

=== New Mexico ===
	1	2	3	4	Total
Lobos	14	14	7	3	38
Cowboys	0	14	7	7	28

=== At Appalachian State ===
	1	2	3	4	Total
Cowboys	0	7	0	6	13
Mountaineers	14	7	7	3	31

=== At Air Force ===
	1	2	3	4	Total
Cowboys	0	3	0	14	17
Falcons	0	7	7	17	31

=== Nevada ===
	1	2	3	4	Total
Wolf Pack	0	7	7	7	21
Cowboys	0	21	7	0	28

=== At Boise State ===
	1	2	3	4	Total
Cowboys	0	7	0	7	14
Broncos	17	7	10	0	34

=== At Utah State ===
	1	2	3	4	Total
Cowboys	7	7	7	6	27
Aggies	14	16	7	21	58

=== Colorado State ===
	1	2	3	4	Total
Rams	17	6	3	0	26
Cowboys	0	0	0	7	7

=== At San Diego State ===
	1	2	3	4	Total
Cowboys	0	0	0	3	3
Aztecs	14	7	3	14	38

=== UNLV ===
	1	2	3	4	Total
Rebels	7	0	7	14	28
Cowboys	0	14	7	14	35

== Personnel ==
=== Coaching staff ===
Name	Position	Seasons at Wyoming	Alma mater	Before Wyoming
Craig Bohl	Head coach	2	Nebraska (1982)	North Dakota State – head coach (2013)
Steve Stanard	Defensive coordinator / Linebackers	2	Nebraska (1989)	North Dakota State – Linebackers (2013)
Brent Vigen	Offensive coordinator / quarterbacks	2	North Dakota State (1998)	North Dakota State – Offensive coordinator / quarterbacks (2013)
Mike Bath	Running Backs / Fullbacks	2	Miami, Ohio (2001)	Miami, Ohio – Interim Head Coach / offensive coordinator (2013)
AJ Cooper	Special teams coordinator / Defensive Ends	2	North Dakota State (2006)	North Dakota State – Defensive ends / Co-Special Teams (2013)
Scott Fuchs	Offensive line	2	North Dakota State (1995)	North Dakota State (2013)
Gordie Haug	Wide Receivers / Director of Recruiting	2	Bemidji State (2009)	North Dakota State – Running backs (2013)
Pete Kaligis	Defensive tackles	7	Washington (1994)	Montana – Offensive line (2008)
Curt Mallory	Defensive pass game coordinator / Secondary	1	Michigan (1992)	Michigan – Secondary (2014)
John Richardson	Cornerbacks	2	North Dakota State (2010)	North Dakota State – Cornerbacks (2013)
Zach Duval	Director of Sports Performance / Head Strength and Conditioning Coach	2	Nebraska (1998)	Buffalo – Director of Sports Performance (2013)
Quinn Brown	Offensive Graduate Assistant	3	Missouri (2011)	William Jewell – Tight ends / assistant special teams coordinator (2012)
Greg Holsworth	Defensive Graduate Assistant	2	Occidental College (2012)	Occidental College – Linebackers / Head Strength and Conditioning Coach (2014)
Shane LaDage	Offensive Graduate Assistant	2	Southwest Minnesota State (2010)	Saint Joseph's College – Wide receivers / tight ends (2013)
Grant Olson	Defensive Graduate Assistant	1	North Dakota State (2014)	North Dakota State – Student assistant (2014)

=== Roster ===
2016 Wyoming Cowboys Football
Quarterbacks: 2 Cameron Coffman – (redshirt) senior (6'2", 197); 12 Aaron Young – junior (6'2", 189); 15 Nick Smith – (redshirt) freshman (6'4", 221); 17 Josh Allen – sophomore (6'5", 210); Running backs: 8 Brian Hill – sophomore (6'1", 211); 16 Milo Hall – freshman (5'8", 188); 21 Shaun Wick – senior (5'10", 215); 22 Nico Evans – (redshirt) freshman (5'9", 190); 29 Kellen Overstreet – freshman (5'11", 200); 32 Joshua Tapscott – sophomore (5'9", 205); Fullbacks: 36 Drew Van Maanen – sophomore (6'1", 226); 38 Wade Cicierski – (redshirt) freshman (5'10", 222); 47 Matt List – (redshirt) freshman (5'11", 223); 48 Jordan Ellis – junior (6'2", 226); Wide receivers: 3 Joseph Parker – freshman (5'10", 175); 4 Tanner Gentry – junior (6'2", 207); 13 Tom Thornton – junior (6'1", 193); 14 C.J. Johnson – freshman (6'2", 180); 20 Justice Murphy – freshman (6'0", 180); 25 Dameko Doddles – freshman (6'2", 205); 30 Jacob McGarvin – sophomore (5'9", 159); 80 James Price – freshman (6'2", 180); 81 Justin Berger – (redshirt) senior (6'2", 198); 82 Tanner Simpson – junior (6'2", 188); 83 Jake Maulhardt – junior (6'6", 205); 87 Joshua Clausen – freshman (6'4", 193); Weston Dinsmore – freshman (6'3", 195); Tight ends: 84 Grant Lewis – (redshirt) freshman (6'5", 220); 85 Tyree Mayfield – (redshirt) freshman (6'3", 223); 88 Jacob Hollister – junior (6'4", 224)	Offensive linemen: 51 Troy Boyland – senior (6'2", 298); 58 Taylor Knestis – sophomore (6'5", 297); 59 Ryan Cummings – sophomore (6'6", 301); 61 Kaden Jackson – freshman (6'2", 265); 62 Eli Moody – (redshirt) junior (6'3", 248); 63 Rafe Kiely – senior (6'3", 301); 64 Charlie Renfree – sophomore (6'3", 255); 67 Cole Turner – (redshirt) freshman (6'4", 276); 69 Richard Bettencourt – (redshirt) freshman (6'3", 280); 72 Zach Wallace – freshman (6'7", 265); 73 Chase Roullier – junior (6'4", 293); 74 Brinkley Jolly – (redshirt) freshman (6'5", 265); 75 Kurtis Stirneman – sophomore (6'5", 280); 77 Pahl Schwab – freshman (6'5", 284); 79 Ryley Southam – (redshirt) freshman (6'3", 270); Danny Bradfield – freshman (6'6", 226); Defensive linemen: 34 Siaosi Hala'api'api – senior (6'2", 250); 47 Tavita Faaiu – junior (6'3", 245); 55 Eddie Yarbrough – senior (6'3", 251); 57 Chase Appleby – junior (6'0", 252); 60 Du'Ryan Ebbesen – junior (6'2", 299); 62 Seth Edeen – sophomore (6'3", 203); 68 Trevor Meader – junior (6'4", 222); 70 Conner Cain – (redshirt) freshman (6'4", 252); 76 Jacob English – junior (6'5", 300); 86 Adam Kinder – junior (6'2", 237); 90 Uso Olive – junior (6'1", 305); 91 Carl Granderson – freshman (6'5", 185); 92 Skylor Clinton – freshman (6'2", 225); 93 Youhanna Ghaifan – freshman (6'4", 255); 96 Sidney Malauulu – (redshirt) freshman (6'3", 288); 98 Dalton Fields – sophomore (6'3", 259); Brent Gilliland – freshman (6'4", 255)	Linebackers: 7 D.J. May – junior (5'11", 207); 9 Malkaam Muhammad – senior (6'0", 215); 11 Christian Irving – freshman (5'11", 195); 11 Eric Nzeocha – junior (6'3", 211); 23 Tim Kamana – sophomore (5'11", 196); 33 Josh Harshman – freshman (6'3", 200); 36 Will Tutein – junior (6'2", 210); 38 Jaylon Watson – freshman (6'0", 215); 42 Kevin Prosser – freshman (6'2", 205); 43 Ben Wisdorf – freshman (6'1", 183); 44 Devin McKenna – junior (6'2", 215); 45 Lucas Wacha – junior (6'1", 214); 50 Luis Bach – freshman (6'2", 208); 52 Waddie Love – sophomore (6'1", 188); Defensive backs: 5 Tyran Finley – senior (5'9", 177); 6 Ryon'e Winters – sophomore (6'0", 185); 17 Isaiah Jefferson – sophomore (5'10", 188); 18 Xavier Lewis – junior (6'0", 195); 19 Anthony Makransky – (redshirt) freshman (5'10", 170); 20 Fred Jones – (redshirt) freshman (5'10", 155); 21 Antonio Hull – freshman (5'10", 185); 22 Marcus Epps – (redshirt) freshman (6'0", 185); 24 Kevin Jackson – freshman (6'3", 185); 26 C.J. Jennings – (redshirt) freshman (5'10", 180); 27 Davion Freeman – freshman (5'9", 175); 28 Andrew Wingard – freshman (6'0", 175); 30 Logan Wilson – freshman (6'1", 185); 31 Chavez Pownell Jr. – (redshirt) freshman (5'11", 192); 32 Adam Pilapil – (redshirt) freshman (6'1", 189); 35 Robert Priester – sophomore (5'9", 168); Jalen Ortiz – junior (5'9", 182); Placekickers: 39 Justin Martin – (redshirt) junior (5'10", 187); 40 Tristan Bailey – freshman (6'1", 190); Punter: 41 Ethan Wood – junior (6'3", 173); Long snapper: 94 Brendan Turelli – junior (6'2", 216)

== Statistics ==
=== Team ===
Team Statistics
	Wyoming	Opponents
Points	228	408
First Downs	237	261
Rushing	119	137
Passing	95	103
Penalty	23	21
Rushing Yards	2081	2702
Rushing Attempts	478	512
Average Per Rush	4.4	5.3
Long	72	74
Rushing TDs	12	28
Passing Yards	2247	2363
Comp–Att	183–308	186–279
Comp %	59.4%	66.7%
Average Per Game	187.2	196.9
Average per Attempt	7.3	8.5
Passing TDs	20	23
INT's	11	5
Touchdowns	32	53
Passing	20	28
Rushing	12	23
Defensive	0	1
Interceptions	5	11
Yards	32	250
Long	19	91
Total Offense	4328	5065
Total Plays	786	791
Average Per Yards/Game	360.7	422.1
Kick Returns: # – Yards	33–776	24–511
TDs	0	0
Long	49	37
Punts	68	48
Yards	2800	2146
Average	41.2	44.7
Punt Returns: # – Yards	14–105	21–97
TDs	0	1
Long	24	20
Fumbles – Fumbles Lost	17–10	9–5
Opposing TD's	53	32
Penalties – Yards	75–681	58–600
3rd–Down Conversions	52/156	68/149
4th–Down Conversions	14/23	7/13
Takeaways	10	21
Field Goals	2–8	13–18
Extra Point	28–31	51–53
Sacks	10	31
Sack Against	31	10
Yards	69	234

=== Offense ===
Passing Statistics
NAME	GP	CMP	ATT	YDS	CMP%	TD	INT
Cameron Coffman	9	152	241	1951	63.1	18	10
Nick Smith	5	27	60	245	45.0	2	1
Josh Allen	2	4	6	51	66.7	0	0
Team	6	0	1	0	0.0	0	0

Rushing Statistics
NAME	GP	CAR	YDS	LONG	TD
Brian Hill	12	281	1631	72	6
Nick Smith	5	45	157	20	2
Shaun Wick	4	43	97	24	1
Josh Tapscott	8	17	86	30	0
Kellen Overstreet	12	16	84	16	1
Nico Evans	10	14	56	17	0
Tanner Gentry	7	5	48	15	0
Josh Allen	2	3	40	24	0
Justin Berger	7	1	8	8	1
Justice Murphy	11	2	6	5	1
TOTALS	12	478	2081	72	12

Receiving Statistics
NAME	GP	REC	YDS	LONG	TD
Jake Maulhardt	12	57	653	42	8
Tanner Gentry	7	37	678	92	4
Jacob Hollister	12	26	355	64	3
Brian Hill	12	20	132	21	0
James Price	12	12	143	35	1
Joseph Parker	12	7	68	16	0
Shaun Wick	4	5	49	20	1
Tyree Mayfield	12	4	21	12	1
Kellen Overstreet	12	3	33	21	0
Josh Harshman	11	2	39	26	1
Justin Berger	7	2	35	22	0
Josh Tapscott	8	2	10	8	1
Tayton Montgomery	8	2	6	4	0
Drew Van Maanen	12	2	4	4	0
Justice Murphy	11	1	17	17	0
TOTALS	12	183	2247	92	20

=== Defense ===
Defensive Statistics
#	NAME	GP	SOLO	AST	TOT	TFL-YDS	SACKS	INT-YDS	BU	QBH	FR–YDS	FF	BLK	SAF
28	Andrew Wingard	12	83	39	122	7.0–18	0.0–0	1–0	2	1	0–0	1	0	0
45	Lucas Wacha	11	46	50	96	6.0–18	0.0–0	0–0	0	1	0–0	1	0	0
35	Marcus Epps	11	59	24	83	2.0–5	0.0–0	2–27	4	0	0–0	1	0	0
7	D.J. May	11	42	27	69	4.5–22	1.0–18	0–0	10	0	1–0	0	0	0
55	Eddie Yarbrough	12	30	32	62	10.5–49	7.0–41	0–0	1	0	1–0	1	1	0
2	Robert Priester	11	36	14	50	2.0–2	0.0–0	1–0	3	0	1–5	1	0	0
91	Carl Granderson	12	21	15	36	6.0–18	1.0–5	0–0	0	0	0–0	0	0	0
11	Eric Nzeocha	11	20	15	35	1.0–1	0.0–0	0–0	1	0	0–0	1	0	0
1	Antonio Hull	12	18	15	33	0.0–0	0.0–0	0–0	6	0	1–0	0	0	0
34	Siaosi Hala'api'api	12	18	13	31	4.5–9	0.0–0	0–0	0	0	0–0	0	0	0
23	Tim Kamana	12	16	15	31	1.0–4	0.0–0	1–5	1	0	0–0	0	0	0
96	Sidney Malauulu	12	9	10	19	0.5–1	0.0–0	0–0	0	0	0–0	0	0	0
31	Chavez Pownell, Jr.	11	10	8	18	0.0–0	0.0–0	0–0	0	0	0–0	0	0	0
26	C.J. Jennings	10	14	4	18	0.0–0	0.0–0	0–0	1	0	0–0	0	0	0
90	Uso Olive	12	2	15	17	1.5–2	0.0–0	0–0	0	0	0–0	0	1	0
10	Adam Pilapil	11	5	8	13	0.0–0	0.0–0	0–0	0	0	0–0	0	0	0
87	Conner Cain	11	4	8	12	1.5–2	0.0–0	0–0	0	0	0–0	0	0	0
57	Chase Appleby	7	5	6	11	0.5–2	0.0–0	0–0	0	0	0–0	0	0	0
19	Anthony Makransky	8	6	4	10	1.0–3	0.0–0	0–0	1	0	0–0	0	0	0
5	Tyran Finley	6	8	2	10	1.0–4	0.0–0	0–0	0	0	0–0	0	0	0
36	Will Tutein	11	3	5	8	0.0–0	0.0–0	0–0	0	0	0–0	0	0	0
22	Nico Evans	10	4	3	7	0.0–0	0.0–0	0–0	0	0	0–0	0	0	0
42	Kevin Prosser	12	4	2	6	1.0–5	1.0–5	0–0	0	0	0–0	0	0	0
44	Devin McKenna	4	1	5	6	0.5–2	0.0–0	0–0	0	0	0–0	0	0	0
98	Dalton Fields	12	2	2	4	0.0–0	0.0–0	0–0	0	0	0–0	0	0	0
29	Kellen Overstreet	12	2	1	3	0.0–0	0.0–0	0–0	0	0	0–0	0	0	0
50	Luis Bach	7	1	1	2	0.0–0	0.0–0	0–0	0	0	0–0	0	0	0
47	Tavita Faaiu	2	1	1	2	0.0–0	0.0–0	0–0	0	0	0–0	0	0	0
85	Tyree Mayfield	12	1	1	2	0.0–0	0.0–0	0–0	0	0	0–0	0	0	0
9	Christian Irving	6	0	1	1	0.0–0	0.0–0	0–0	0	0	0–0	0	0	0
63	Rafe Kiely	12	1	0	1	0.0–0	0.0–0	0–0	0	0	0–0	0	0	0
73	Chase Roullier	12	1	0	1	0.0–0	0.0–0	0–0	0	0	0–0	0	0	0
72	Zach Wallace	12	1	0	1	0.0–0	0.0–0	0–0	0	0	0–0	0	0	0
20	Justice Murphy	11	1	0	1	0.0–0	0.0–0	0–0	0	0	0–0	0	0	0
3	Joseph Parker	12	1	0	1	0.0–0	0.0–0	0–0	0	0	0–0	0	0	0
TM	Team	6	1	0	1	0.0–0	0.0–0	0–0	0	0	1–0	0	0	0
8	Brian Hill	12	1	0	1	0.0–0	0.0–0	0–0	0	0	0–0	0	0	0
	TOTAL	12	478	346	824	52–167	10–69	5–32	30	2	5–5	6	2	0
	OPPONENTS	12	454	362	816	76–346	31–234	11–250	41	4	10–0	7	2	0

Key: SOLO: Solo Tackles, AST: Assisted Tackles, TOT: Total Tackles, TFL: Tackles-for-loss, SACK: Quarterback Sacks, INT: Interceptions, BU: Passes Broken Up, QBH: Quarterback Hits, FF: Forced Fumbles, FR: Fumbles Recovered, BLK: Kicks or Punts Blocked, SAF: Safeties

Interceptions Statistics
NAME	NO.	YDS	AVG	TD	LNG
Marcus Epps	2	27	13.5	0	19
Andrew Wingard	1	0	0.0	0	0
Tim Kamana	1	5	5.0	0	5
Robert Priester	1	0	0.0	0	0
TOTALS	5	32	6.4	0	19

=== Special teams ===
Kicking statistics
NAME	XPM	XPA	XP%	FGM	FGA	FG%	1–19	20–29	30–39	40–49	50+	LNG	PTS
Tristan Bailey	28	31	90.3%	2	8	25.0%	0–0	0–0	1–4	1–4	0–0	41	34
TOTALS	28	31	90.3%	2	8	25.0%	0–0	0–0	1–4	1–4	0–0	41	34

Kick return statistics
NAME	RTNS	YDS	AVG	TD	LNG
D.J. May	24	630	26.2	0	49
Nico Evans	2	21	10.5	0	9
Tanner Gentry	2	15	7.5	0	15
Drew Van Maanen	2	35	17.5	0	19
Kellen Overstreet	2	51	25.5	0	26
Justice Murphy	1	24	24.0	0	24
TOTALS	33	776	23.5	0	49

Punting statistics
NAME	PUNTS	YDS	AVG	LONG	TB	FC	I–20	50+	BLK
Ethan Wood	67	2800	41.8	67	4	9	19	12	1
Team	1	0	0.0	0	0	0	0	0	0
TOTALS	68	2800	41.2	67	4	9	19	12	1

Punt return statistics
NAME	RTNS	YDS	AVG	TD	LONG
Tanner Gentry	7	73	10.4	0	24
D.J. May	4	20	5.0	0	10
Andrew Wingard	3	12	4.0	0	16
TOTALS	14	105	7.5	0	24

=== Scores by quarter (all opponents) ===
	1	2	3	4	Total
All opponents	125	116	65	102	408
Wyoming	28	80	43	77	228
