= 2015 Colorado State Rams football team =

American college football season

2015 Colorado State Rams football

Arizona Bowl, L 23–28 vs. Nevada
- Conference: Mountain West Conference
- Mountain Division
- Record: 7–6 (5–3 MW)
- Head coach: Mike Bobo (1st season)
- Offensive coordinator: Will Friend (1st season)
- Defensive coordinator: Tyson Summers (1st season)
- Home stadium: Sonny Lubick Field at Hughes Stadium

2015 Mountain West Conference football standings
	Conf.			Overall
Team	W		L	W		L
Mountain Division
Air Force x	6	–	2	8	–	6
New Mexico	5	–	3	7	–	6
Utah State	5	–	3	6	–	7
Boise State	5	–	3	9	–	4
Colorado State	5	–	3	7	–	6
Wyoming	2	–	6	2	–	10
West Division
San Diego State x$	8	–	0	11	–	3
Nevada	4	–	4	7	–	6
San Jose State	4	–	4	6	–	7
Fresno State	2	–	6	3	–	9
UNLV	2	–	6	3	–	9
Hawaii	0	–	8	3	–	10
Championship: San Diego State 27, Air Force 24
$ – Conference champion; x – Division champion/co-champions; Rankings from AP Poll

The 2015 Colorado State Rams football team represented Colorado State University during the 2015 NCAA Division I FBS football season. The Rams were led by first-year head coach Mike Bobo and played their home games at Sonny Lubick Field at Hughes Stadium. They were members of the Mountain Division of the Mountain West Conference. They finished the season 7–6, 5–3 in Mountain West play to finish in a four-way tie for second place in the Mountain Division. They were invited to the inaugural Arizona Bowl where they lost to fellow Mountain West member Nevada.

== Schedule ==
Date	Time	Opponent	Site	TV	Result	Attendance
September 5	2:00 p.m.	Savannah State*	Sonny Lubick Field at Hughes Stadium; Fort Collins, CO	MWN	W 65–13	24,571
September 12	1:30 p.m.	Minnesota*	Sonny Lubick Field at Hughes Stadium; Fort Collins, CO	CBSSN	L 20–23 ^{OT}	32,500
September 19	5:00 p.m.	vs. Colorado*	Sports Authority Field at Mile High; Denver, CO (Rocky Mountain Showdown)	CBSSN	L 24–27 ^{OT}	66,253
September 26	5:00 p.m.	at UTSA*	Alamodome; San Antonio, TX	CBSSN	W 33–31	24,705
October 3	5:00 p.m.	at Utah State	Maverik Stadium; Logan, UT	ESPN3	L 18–33	22,059
October 10	5:00 p.m.	No. 25 Boise State	Sonny Lubick Field at Hughes Stadium; Fort Collins, CO	CBSSN	L 10–41	26,117
October 17	1:30 p.m.	Air Force	Sonny Lubick Field at Hughes Stadium; Fort Collins, CO (rivalry)	CBSSN	W 38–23	32,546
October 31	1:30 p.m.	San Diego State	Sonny Lubick Field at Hughes Stadium; Fort Collins, CO	CBSSN	L 17–41	18,125
November 7	1:00 p.m.	at Wyoming	War Memorial Stadium; Laramie, WY (Border War)	ESPN3	W 26–7	18,682
November 14	5:00 p.m.	UNLV	Sonny Lubick Field at Hughes Stadium; Fort Collins, CO	RTRM	W 49–35	15,641
November 21	3:30 p.m.	at New Mexico	University Stadium; Albuquerque, NM	RTRM	W 28–21	21,643
November 28	7:00 p.m.	at Fresno State	Bulldog Stadium; Fresno, CA	CBSSN	W 34–31	26,375
December 29	5:30 p.m.	vs. Nevada*	Arizona Stadium; Tucson, AZ (Arizona Bowl)	ASN	L 23–28	20,425
*Non-conference game; Rankings from AP Poll released prior to the game; All times are in Mountain time

== Game summaries ==
=== Savannah State ===
	1	2	3	4	Total
Tigers	0	7	0	6	13
Rams	24	21	13	7	65

=== Minnesota ===
	1	2	3	4	OT	Total
Golden Gophers	0	6	7	7	3	23
Rams	7	0	3	10	0	20

=== Vs. Colorado ===
	1	2	3	4	OT	Total
Rams	14	0	3	7	0	24
Buffaloes	0	10	7	7	3	27

=== At UTSA ===
	1	2	3	4	Total
Rams	9	7	14	3	33
Roadrunners	7	10	7	7	31

=== At Utah State ===
	1	2	3	4	Total
Rams	3	7	0	8	18
Aggies	3	14	6	10	33

=== Boise State ===
	1	2	3	4	Total
No. 24 Broncos	17	10	7	7	41
Rams	0	10	0	0	10

=== Air Force ===
	1	2	3	4	Total
Air Force	6	7	0	10	23
Rams	14	7	14	3	38

=== San Diego State ===
	1	2	3	4	Total
Aztecs	7	6	14	14	41
Rams	7	3	0	7	17

=== At Wyoming ===
	1	2	3	4	Total
Rams	17	6	3	0	26
Cowboys	0	0	0	7	7

=== UNLV ===
	1	2	3	4	Total
Rebels	14	7	7	7	35
Rams	14	14	7	14	49

=== At New Mexico ===
	1	2	3	4	Total
Rams	14	3	3	8	28
Lobos	7	7	7	0	21

=== At Fresno State ===
	1	2	3	4	Total
Rams	7	7	13	7	34
Bulldogs	10	14	0	7	31

=== Arizona Bowl–Nevada ===
	1	2	3	4	Total
Wolf Pack	3	16	3	6	28
Rams	0	13	7	3	23

The Rams and Wolf Pack are both members of the Mountain West Conference. However, they are in opposite divisions and did not play each other in the regular season in 2015. This is the first time teams from the same conference have met in a non-championship bowl game since the 1979 Orange Bowl.

== Players in the 2016 NFL draft ==
Player	Position	Round	Pick	NFL club
Rashard Higgins	WR	5	172	Cleveland Browns
Cory James	LB	6	194	Oakland Raiders
