= 2015 UNLV Rebels football team =

American college football season

2015 UNLV Rebels football
- Conference: Mountain West Conference
- West Division
- Record: 3–9 (2–6 MW)
- Head coach: Tony Sanchez (1st season)
- Offensive coordinator: Barney Cotton (1st season)
- Offensive scheme: Multiple
- Defensive coordinator: Kent Baer (1st season)
- Base defense: 4–3
- Home stadium: Sam Boyd Stadium

2015 Mountain West Conference football standings
	Conf.			Overall
Team	W		L	W		L
Mountain Division
Air Force x	6	–	2	8	–	6
New Mexico	5	–	3	7	–	6
Utah State	5	–	3	6	–	7
Boise State	5	–	3	9	–	4
Colorado State	5	–	3	7	–	6
Wyoming	2	–	6	2	–	10
West Division
San Diego State x$	8	–	0	11	–	3
Nevada	4	–	4	7	–	6
San Jose State	4	–	4	6	–	7
Fresno State	2	–	6	3	–	9
UNLV	2	–	6	3	–	9
Hawaii	0	–	8	3	–	10
Championship: San Diego State 27, Air Force 24
$ – Conference champion; x – Division champion/co-champions; Rankings from AP Poll

The 2015 UNLV Rebels football team represented the University of Nevada, Las Vegas (UNLV) as a member of the Mountain West Conference (MW) during the 2015 NCAA Division I FBS football season. Led by first-year head coach Tony Sanchez, the Rebels compiled an overall record of 3–9 record with mark of 2–6 in conference play, tying for fourth place in the MW's West Division. The team played home games at Sam Boyd Stadium in Whitney, Nevada.

== Schedule ==
Date	Time	Opponent	Site	TV	Result	Attendance
September 5	4:30 p.m.	at Northern Illinois*	Huskie Stadium; Dekalb, IL	CBSSN	L 30–38	15,455
September 12	7:30 p.m.	No. 13 UCLA*	Sam Boyd Stadium; Whitney, NV	CBSSN	L 3–37	31,262
September 19	9:00 a.m.	at Michigan*	Michigan Stadium; Ann Arbor, MI	BTN	L 7–28	108,683
September 26	6:00 p.m.	Idaho State*	Sam Boyd Stadium; Whitney, NV	MWN	W 80–8	16,717
October 3	4:00 p.m.	at Nevada	Mackay Stadium; Reno, NV (Fremont Cannon)	MWN	W 23–17	29,551
October 10	6:00 p.m.	San Jose State	Sam Boyd Stadium; Whitney, NV	MWN	L 27–33 ^{OT}	19,190
October 16	7:30 p.m.	at Fresno State	Bulldog Stadium; Fresno, CA	ESPN2	L 28–31	25,604
October 31	12:30 p.m.	Boise State	Sam Boyd Stadium; Whitney, NV	ESPNU	L 27–55	14,315
November 7	3:00 p.m.	Hawaii^{†}	Sam Boyd Stadium; Whitney, NV	MWN, Oceanic PPV	W 41–21	20,006
November 14	4:00 p.m.	at Colorado State	Hughes Stadium; Fort Collins, CO	RTRM	L 35–49	15,641
November 21	7:30 p.m.	San Diego State	Sam Boyd Stadium; Whitney, NV	CBSSN	L 14–52	14,738
November 28	11:00 a.m.	at Wyoming	War Memorial Stadium; Laramie, WY	RTRM	L 28–35	11,149
*Non-conference game; ^{†}Homecoming; Rankings from AP Poll released prior to the game; All times are in Pacific time

== Game summaries ==
=== At Northern Illinois ===
UNLV at Northern Illinois

Team	1	2	3	4	Total
Rebels	7	10	3	10	30
• Huskies	3	7	14	14	38

- Date: September 5, 2015
- Location: Huskie Stadium
  Dekalb, IL
- Game start: 6:30 p.m. CDT
- Elapsed time: 3 hours and 26 minutes
- Game attendance: 15,455
- Game weather: Temperature: 79 °F (26 °C) • Weather: Partly Cloudy • Wind: SE 6 MPH
- Referee: David Alvarez
- TV announcers (CBSSN): Andrew Catalon, Adam Archuleta and Rashan Ali (sideline)

Scoring summary
1	12:31	UNLV	Devonte Boyd 64–yard pass from Blake Decker (Nicolai Bornand kick)	UNLV 7–0
1	10:39	NIU	Christian Hagan 48–yard field goal	UNLV 7–3
2	14:54	UNLV	Kurt Palandech 18–yard run (Nicolai Bornand kick)	UNLV 14–3
2	04:18	UNLV	Nicolai Bornand 21–yard field goal	UNLV 17–3
2	01:38	NIU	Shane Wimann 16–yard pass from Drew Hare (Christian Hagan kick)	UNLV 17–10
3	13:48	NIU	Desroy Maxwell 16–yard pass from Drew Hare (Christian Hagan kick)	TIE 17–17
3	09:05	UNLV	Nicolai Bornand 33–yard field goal	UNLV 20–17
3	01:24	NIU	Joel Bouagnon 16–yard run (Christian Hagan kick)	NIU 24–20
4	13:50	UNLV	Nicolai Bornand 51–yard field goal	NIU 24–23
4	11:34	NIU	Joel Bouagnon 1–yard run (Christian Hagan kick)	NIU 31–23
4	08:10	NIU	Joel Bouagnon 29–yard run (Christian Hagan kick)	NIU 38–23
4	05:26	UNLV	Aaron Criswell 41–yard pass from Blake Decker (Nicolai Bornand kick)	NIU 38–30

- Passing leaders: NIU – Drew Hare, 21–26, 360 yards, 2 touchdowns and UNLV – Blake Decker, 21–39, 319 yards, 2 touchdowns, 1 interception
- Rushing leaders: NIU – Joel Bouagnon, 21 carries, 152 yards, 3 touchdowns and UNLV – Keith Whitley, 21 carries, 68 yards
- Receiving leaders: NIU – Kenny Golladay, 9 receptions, 213 yards and UNLV – Devonte Boyd, 5 receptions, 107 yards, 1 touchdown
- Tackling leaders: NIU – Boomer Mays, 13 tackles and UNLV – Peni Vea, 9 tackles

=== UCLA ===
UCLA at UNLV

Team	1	2	3	4	Total
• No. 13 Bruins	10	7	17	3	37
Rebels	0	0	0	3	3

- Date: September 12, 2015
- Location: Sam Boyd Stadium
  Whitney, NV
- Game start: 7:40 p.m. PDT
- Elapsed time: 3 hours and 35 minutes
- Game attendance: 31,262
- Game weather: Temperature: 97 °F (36 °C) • Weather: Clear • Wind: S 9 MPH
- Referee: Kevin Mar
- TV announcers (CBSSN): Carter Blackburn, Aaron Taylor and Jenny Dell (sideline)

Scoring summary
1	12:36	UCLA	Jordan Payton 29–yard pass from Josh Rosen (Ka'imi Fairbairn kick)	UCLA 7–0
1	08:22	UCLA	Ka'imi Fairbairn 35–yard field goal	UCLA 10–0
2	03:06	UCLA	Kenny Young 23–yard interception return (Ka'imi Fairbairn kick)	UCLA 17–0
3	12:00	UCLA	Paul Perkins 7–yard run (Ka'imi Fairbairn kick)	UCLA 24–0
3	06:00	UCLA	Paul Perkins 56–yard run (Ka'imi Fairbairn kick)	UCLA 31–0
3	01:30	UCLA	Ka'imi Fairbairn 34–yard field goal	UCLA 34–0
4	10:51	UCLA	Ka'imi Fairbairn 42–yard field goal	UCLA 37–0
4	03:04	UNLV	Nicolai Bornand 32–yard field goal	UCLA 37–3

- Passing leaders: UCLA – Josh Rosen, 22–42, 223 yards, 1 touchdown and UNLV – Blake Decker, 2–6, 52 yards
- Rushing leaders: UCLA – Paul Perkins, 18 carries, 151 yards, 2 touchdowns and UNLV – Keith Whitley, 12 carries, 73 yards
- Receiving leaders: UCLA – Jordan Payton, 5 receptions, 70 yards, 1 touchdown and UNLV – Devonte Boyd, 3 receptions, 55 yards
- Tackling leaders: UCLA – Kenny Young, 5 tackles and UNLV – Peni Vea, 8 tackles

=== At Michigan ===
UNLV at Michigan

Team	1	2	3	4	Total
Rebels	0	0	0	7	7
• Wolverines	7	14	0	7	28

- Date: September 19, 2015
- Location: Michigan Stadium
  Ann Arbor, MI
- Game start: 12:01 p.m. EDT
- Elapsed time: 3 hours and 2 minutes
- Game attendance: 108,683
- Game weather: Temperature: Low 70s • Weather: Cloudy • Wind: SW 15–25 MPH
- Referee: Mike Conlin
- TV announcers (BTN): Eric Collins, Chuck Long and Rick Pizzo (sideline)

Scoring summary
1	09:30	MICH	De'Veon Smith 5–yard pass from Jake Rudock (Kenny Allen kick)	MICH 7–0
2	13:56	MICH	Jehu Chesson 36–yard run (Kenny Allen kick)	MICH 14–0
2	07:50	MICH	Ty Isaac 76–yard run (Kenny Allen kick)	MICH 21–0
4	11:31	MICH	Sione Houma 1–yard run (Kenny Allen kick)	MICH 28–0
4	09:17	UNLV	Devonte Boyd 6–yard pass from Blake Decker (Nicolai Bornand kick)	MICH 28–7

- Passing leaders: MICH – Jake Rudock, 14–22, 123 yards, 1 touchdown, 1 interception and UNLV – Blake Decker, 8–16, 96 yards, 1 touchdown, 2 interceptions
- Rushing leaders: MICH – Ty Isaac, 8 carries, 114 yards, 1 touchdown and UNLV – Keith Whitley, 13 carries, 29 yards
- Receiving leaders: MICH – Amara Darboh, 4 receptions, 34 yards and UNLV – Devonte Boyd, 3 receptions, 65 yards, 1 touchdown
- Tackling leaders: MICH – Joe Bolden, 6 tackles and UNLV – Tau Lotulelei, 8 tackles

=== Idaho State ===
Idaho State at UNLV

Team	1	2	3	4	Total
Bengals	0	8	0	0	8
• Rebels	35	21	17	7	80

- Date: September 26, 2015
- Location: Sam Boyd Stadium
  Whitney, NV
- Game start: 6:05 p.m. PDT
- Elapsed time: 3 hours and 16 minutes
- Game attendance: 16,717
- Game weather: Temperature: 99 °F (37 °C) • Weather: Clear and Hot • Wind: SSE 9 MPH
- Referee: Scott Campbell
- TV announcers (MWN): Tony Cordasco and Caleb Herring

Scoring summary
1	14:09	UNLV	Keith Whitley 24–yard pass from Blake Decker (Nicolai Bornand kick)	UNLV 7–0
1	05:54	UNLV	Blake Decker 12–yard run (Nicolai Bornand kick)	UNLV 14–0
1	05:33	UNLV	Lexington Thomas 40–yard run (Nicolai Bornand kick)	UNLV 21–0
1	01:45	UNLV	Keith Whitley 2–yard run (Nicolai Bornand kick)	UNLV 28–0
1	00:44	UNLV	Xzaviar Campbell 21–yard run (Nicolai Bornand kick)	UNLV 35–0
2	14:13	ISU	C.J. Hatchett 25–yard pass from Michael Sanders (rush)	UNLV 35–8
2	08:39	UNLV	Devonte Boyd 4–yard pass from Kurt Palandech (Nicolai Bornand kick)	UNLV 42–8
2	03:49	UNLV	Aaron Criswell 36–yard pass from Blake Decker (Nicolai Bornand kick)	UNLV 49–8
2	00:00	UNLV	Nicolai Bornand 30–yard field goal	UNLV 52–8
3	12:01	UNLV	Jake Phillips 6–yard pass from Kurt Palandech (Nicolai Bornand kick)	UNLV 59–8
3	06:45	UNLV	Xzaviar Campbell 53–yard run (Nicolai Bornand kick)	UNLV 66–8
3	02:59	UNLV	Troy Hawthorne 47–yard interception return (Nicolai Bornand kick)	UNLV 73–8
4	02:51	UNLV	George Naufahu 2–yard run (Nicolai Bornand kick)	UNLV 80–8

- Passing leaders: ISU – Michael Sanders, 14–33, 164 yards, 1 touchdown, 3 interceptions and UNLV – Blake Decker, 7–11, 99 yards, 2 touchdowns
- Rushing leaders ISU – Xavier Finney, 15 carries, 59 yards and UNLV – Xzaviar Campbell, 9 carries, 139 yards, 2 touchdowns
- Receiving leaders: ISU – Madison Mangum, 8 receptions, 97 yards and UNLV – Kendal Keys, 3 receptions, 30 yards
- Tackling leaders: ISU – Cody Sorenson, 10 tackles and UNLV – Tau Lotulelei, 7 tackles

=== At Nevada ===
UNLV at Nevada
(Battle for the Fremont Cannon / Governor's Series)

Team	1	2	3	4	Total
• Rebels	7	6	0	10	23
Wolf Pack	0	0	3	14	17

- Date: October 3, 2015
- Location: Mackay Stadium
  Reno, NV
- Game start: 4:05 p.m. PDT
- Elapsed time: 3 hours and 19 minutes
- Game attendance: 29,551
- Game weather: Temperature: 72 °F (22 °C) • Weather: Partly Cloudy • Wind: W 14 MPH
- Referee: Brandon Cruse
- TV announcers (MWN): Ari Wolfe and Darius Walker

Scoring summary
1	08:58	UNLV	Keith Whitley 37–yard run (Nicolai Bornand kick)	UNLV 7–0
2	00:30	UNLV	Kurt Palandech 12–yard run (Nicolai Bornand kick failed)	UNLV 13–0
3	10:35	NEV	Brent Zuzo 27–yard field goal	UNLV 13–3
4	10:47	NEV	Jerico Richardson 22–yard pass from Tyler Stewart (Brent Zuzo kick)	UNLV 13–10
4	08:27	UNLV	Ryan McAleenan 52–yard interception return (Nicolai Bornand kick)	UNLV 20–10
4	04:50	NEV	Don Jackson 1–yard run (Brent Zuzo kick)	UNLV 20–17
4	01:53	UNLV	Nicolai Bornand 45–yard field goal	UNLV 23–17

- Passing leaders: NEV – Tyler Stewart, 20–44, 202 yards, 1 touchdown, 1 interception and UNLV – Blake Decker, 7–11, 86 yards, 1 interception
- Rushing leaders: NEV – Tyler Stewart, 11 carries, 61 yards and UNLV – Keith Whitley, 16 carries, 76 yards, 1 touchdown
- Receiving leaders: NEV – Jerico Richardson, 8 receptions, 87 yards, 1 touchdown and UNLV – Devonte Boyd, 4 receptions, 39 yards
- Tackling leaders: NEV – Matthew Lyons, 12 tackles and UNLV – Blake Richmond, 11 tackles

=== San Jose State ===
San Jose State at UNLV

Team	1	2	3	4	OT	Total
• Spartans	0	17	3	7	6	33
Rebels	7	3	0	17	0	27

- Date: October 10, 2015
- Location: Sam Boyd Stadium
  Whitney, NV
- Game start: 6:05 p.m. PDT
- Elapsed time: 3 hours and 24 minutes
- Game attendance: 19,190
- Game weather: Temperature: 91 °F (33 °C) • Weather: Clear • Wind: E 6 MPH
- Referee: David Alvarez
- TV announcers (MWN): Ray Crawford and Sherdrick Bonner

Scoring summary
1	09:40	UNLV	George Naufahu 1–yard run (Nicolai Bornand kick)	UNLV 7–0
2	12:39	UNLV	Nicolai Bornand 27–yard field goal	UNLV 10–0
2	07:45	SJSU	Austin Lopez 30–yard field goal	UNLV 10–3
2	04:43	SJSU	Billy Freeman 11–yard pass from Kenny Potter (Austin Lopez kick)	TIE 10–10
2	01:09	SJSU	Kenny Potter 20–yard run (Austin Lopez kick)	SJSU 17–10
3	06:22	SJSU	Austin Lopez 34–yard field goal	SJSU 20–10
4	10:23	UNLV	Andrew Price 25–yard pass from Kurt Palandech (Nicolai Bornand kick)	SJSU 20–17
4	03:41	UNLV	Devonte Boyd 22–yard pass from Kurt Palandech (Nicolai Bornand kick)	UNLV 24–20
4	01:08	SJSU	Tyler Ervin 21–yard pass from Kenny Potter (Austin Lopez kick)	SJSU 27–24
4	00:11	UNLV	Nicolai Bornand 49–yard field goal	TIE 27–27
OT	15:00	SJSU	Tyler Ervin 2–yard run	SJSU 33–27

- Passing leaders: SJSU – Kenny Potter, 30–48, 329 yards, 2 touchdowns, 1 interception and UNLV – Kurt Palandech, 15–30, 217 yards, 2 touchdowns, 2 interceptions
- Rushing leaders: SJSU – Tyler Ervin, 18 carries, 73 yards, 1 touchdown and UNLV – Kurt Palandech, 18 carries, 47 yards
- Receiving leaders: SJSU – Tyler Ervin, 8 receptions, 74 yards, 1 touchdown and UNLV – Kendal Keys, 5 receptions, 84 yards
- Tackling leaders: SJSU – Frank Ginda, 14 tackles and UNLV – Ryan McAleenan, 12 tackles

=== At Fresno State ===
UNLV at Fresno State

Team	1	2	3	4	Total
Rebels	7	7	14	0	28
• Bulldogs	7	7	3	14	31

- Date: October 16, 2015
- Location: Bulldog Stadium
  Fresno, CA
- Game start: 7:32 p.m. PDT
- Elapsed time: 3 hours and 20 minutes
- Game attendance: 25,604
- Game weather: Temperature: 82 °F (28 °C) • Weather: Partly Cloudy • Wind: SW 8 MPH
- Referee: Marvel July
- TV announcers (ESPN2): Russ Langer and Mike Pritchard

Scoring summary
1	08:24	UNLV	George Naufahu 1–yard run (Nicolai Bornand kick)	UNLV 7–0
1	02:49	FS	Kilton Anderson 6–yard run (Kody Kroening kick)	TIE 7–7
2	06:11	FS	Marteze Waller 17–yard run (Kody Kroening kick)	FS 14–7
2	00:42	UNLV	Kendal Keys 13–yard pass from Kurt Palandech (Nicolai Bornand kick)	TIE 14–14
3	09:05	UNLV	Xzaviar Campbell 2–yard run (Nicolai Bornand kick)	UNLV 21–14
3	05:13	UNLV	Devonte Boyd 29–yard pass from Kurt Palandech (Nicolai Bornand kick)	UNLV 28–14
3	02:23	FS	Jimmy Camacho 44–yard field goal	UNLV 28–17
4	11:02	FS	Kilton Anderson 12–yard run (pass interception, rush failed)	UNLV 28–23
4	02:37	FS	Marteze Waller 38–yard run (Chad Olsen pass from Kilton Anderson)	FS 31–28

- Passing leaders: FS – Kilton Anderson, 19–31, 193 yards and UNLV – Kurt Palandech, 12–24, 111 yards, 2 touchdowns
- Rushing leaders: FS – Marteze Waller, 21 carries, 111 yards, 2 touchdowns and UNLV – Keith Whitley, 17 carries, 98 yards
- Receiving leaders: FS – Jamire Jordan, 5 receptions, 42 yards and UNLV – Keith Whitley, 3 receptions, 14 yards
- Tackling leaders: FS – Ejiro Ederaine, 12 tackles and UNLV – Ryan McAleenan, 10 tackles

=== Boise State ===
Boise State at UNLV

Team	1	2	3	4	Total
• Broncos	10	14	3	28	55
Rebels	3	14	3	7	27

- Date: October 31, 2015
- Location: Sam Boyd Stadium
  Whitney, NV
- Game start: 12:32 p.m. PDT
- Elapsed time: 3 hours and 43 minutes
- Game attendance: 14,315
- Game weather: Temperature: 76 °F (24 °C) • Weather: Sunny and Clear • Wind: E 2 MPH
- Referee: Eddy Shelton
- TV announcers (ESPNU): Clay Matvick and John Congemi

Scoring summary
1	09:30	BSU	Tyler Rausa 25–yard field goal	BSU 3–0
1	03:51	BSU	Brett Rypien 4–yard pass from Thomas Sperbeck (Tyler Rausa kick)	BSU 10–0
1	00:48	UNLV	Nicolai Bornand 20–yard field goal	BSU 10–3
2	13:13	BSU	Jake Hardee 44–yard pass from Brett Rypien (Tyler Rausa kick)	BSU 17–3
2	11:51	UNLV	Fred Wilson 1–yard fumble recovery (Nicolai Bornand kick)	BSU 17–10
2	08:52	BSU	Kelsey Young 2–yard run (Tyler Rausa kick)	BSU 24–10
2	06:28	UNLV	Eric Noone 0–yard fumble recovery (Nicolai Bornand kick)	BSU 24–17
3	09:23	BSU	Tyler Rausa 44–yard field goal	BSU 27–10
3	05:34	UNLV	Nicolai Bornand 27–yard field goal	BSU 27–20
4	14:22	BSU	Shane Williams-Rhodes 9–yard run (Tyler Rausa kick)	BSU 34–20
4	11:12	UNLV	Xzaviar Campbell 11–yard run (Nicolai Bornand kick)	BSU 34–27
4	09:48	BSU	Chaz Anderson 54–yard pass from Brett Rypien (Tyler Rausa kick)	BSU 41–27
4	05:53	BSU	Jeremy McNichols 40–yard run (Tyler Rausa kick)	BSU 48–27
4	02:37	BSU	Thomas Stuart 2–yard run (Tyler Rausa kick)	BSU 55–27

- Passing leaders: BSU – Brett Rypien, 35–52, 469 yards, 2 touchdowns and UNLV – Blake Decker, 29–50, 357 yards, 2 interceptions
- Rushing leaders: BSU – Jeremy McNichols, 22 carries, 122 yards, 1 touchdown and UNLV – Xzaviar Campbell, 9 carries, 29 yards, 1 touchdown
- Receiving leaders: BSU – Thomas Sperbeck, 10 receptions, 163 yards and UNLV – Devonte Boyd, 10 receptions, 116 yards
- Tackling leaders: BSU – Jonathan Moxey, 9 tackles and UNLV – Blake Richmond, 10 tackles

=== Hawaii ===
Hawaii at UNLV

Team	1	2	3	4	Total
Rainbow Warriors	0	7	7	7	21
• Rebels	7	7	10	17	41

- Date: November 7, 2015
- Location: Sam Boyd Stadium
  Whitney, NV
- Game start: 3:07 p.m. PST
- Elapsed time: 3 hours and 33 minutes
- Game attendance: 20,006
- Game weather: Temperature: 66 °F (19 °C) • Weather: Sunny and Clear • Wind: N 10 MPH
- Referee: Kevin Mar
- TV announcers (MWN/Oceanic PPV): Robert Kekaula and Rich Miano

Scoring summary
1	10:19	UNLV	Xzaviar Campbell 3–yard run (Nicolai Bornand kick)	UNLV 7–0
2	07:04	UH	Paul Harris 34–yard run (Rigoberto Sanchez kick)	TIE 7–7
2	02:31	UNLV	Aaron Criswell 85–yard pass from Blake Decker (Nicolai Bornand kick)	UNLV 14–7
3	07:54	UNLV	Nicolai Bornand 31–yard field goal	UNLV 17–7
3	05:56	UH	Melvin Davis 1–yard run (Rigoberto Sanchez kick)	UNLV 17–14
3	05:44	UNLV	Devonte Boyd 75–yard pass from Blake Decker (Nicolai Bournand kick)	UNLV 24–14
4	13:47	UNLV	Nicolai Bornand 31–yard field goal	UNLV 27–14
4	11:46	UH	Melvin Davis 3–yard run (Rigoberto Sanchez kick)	UNLV 27–21
4	07:09	UNLV	Lexington Thomas 3–yard run (Nicolai Bournand kick)	UNLV 34–21
4	02:10	UNLV	Keith Whitley 7–yard run (Nicolai Bournand kick)	UNLV 41–21

- Passing leaders: UH – Ikaika Woolsey, 16–33, 187 yards, 2 touchdowns, 1 interception and UNLV – Blake Decker, 15–24, 258 yards, 2 touchdowns, 1 interception
- Rushing leaders: UH – Paul Harris, 20 carries, 192 yards, 1 touchdown and UNLV – Keith Whitley, 21 carries, 124 yards, 1 touchdown
- Receiving leaders: UH – Devan Stubblefield, 5 receptions, 27 yards and UNLV – Devonte Boyd, 6 receptions, 120 yards, 1 touchdown
- Tackling leaders: UH – Julian Gener, 11 tackles and UNLV – Tau Lotulelei, 12 tackles

=== At Colorado State ===
UNLV at Colorado State

Team	1	2	3	4	Total
Rebels	14	7	7	7	35
• Rams	14	14	7	14	49

- Date: November 14, 2015
- Location: Hughes Stadium
  Fort Collins, CO
- Game start: 5:08 p.m. MST
- Elapsed time: 3 hours and 28 minutes
- Game attendance: 15,641
- Game weather: Temperature: 54 °F (12 °C) • Weather: Clear • Wind: SE 6 MPH
- Referee: Marvel July
- TV announcers (RTRM): Marc Stout, Sherdrick Bonner and Brad Thompson (sideline)

Scoring summary
1	12:34	CSU	Rashard Higgins 9–yard pass from Nick Stevens (Wyatt Bryan kick)	CSU 7–0
1	07:09	UNLV	Kendal Keys 9–yard pass from Blake Decker (Nicolai Bornand kick)	TIE 7–7
1	03:19	UNLV	Kendal Keys 8–yard pass from Blake Decker (Nicolai Bornand kick)	UNLV 14–7
1	00:16	CSU	Jasen Oden Jr. 17–yard run (Wyatt Bryan kick)	TIE 14–14
2	07:41	CSU	Dalyn Dawkins 3–yard pass from Nick Stevens (Wyatt Bryan kick)	CSU 21–14
2	03:56	UNLV	Kurt Palandech 14–yard run (Nicolai Bornand kick)	TIE 21–21
2	00:13	CSU	Nu'uvali Fa'apito 1–yard run (Wyatt Bryan kick)	CSU 28–21
3	11:13	CSU	Rashard Higgins 8–yard pass from Nick Stevens (Wyatt Bryan kick)	CSU 35–21
3	02:21	UNLV	Kendal Keys 20–yard pass from Kurt Palandech (Nicolai Bornand kick)	CSU 35–28
4	07:41	CSU	Rashard Higgins 4–yard pass from Nick Stevens (Wyatt Bryan kick)	CSU 42–28
4	01:45	CSU	Nu'uvali Fa'apito 1–yard run (Wyatt Bryan kick)	CSU 49–28
4	01:00	UNLV	Lexington Thomas 32–yard run (Nicolai Bornand kick)	CSU 49–35

- Passing leaders: CSU – Nick Stevens, 13–19, 209 yards, 4 touchdowns, 1 interception and UNLV – Blake Decker, 13–19, 176 yards, 2 touchdowns
- Rushing leaders: CSU – Dalyn Dawkins, 19 carries, 151 yards and UNLV – Lexington Thomas, 11 carries, 118 yards, 1 touchdown
- Receiving leaders: CSU – Rashard Higgins, 7 receptions, 102 yards, 3 touchdown and UNLV – Devonte Boyd, 8 receptions, 131 yards
- Tackling leaders: CSU – Deonte Clyburn, 12 tackles and UNLV – Blake Richmond, 10 tackles

=== San Diego State ===
San Diego State at UNLV

Team	1	2	3	4	Total
• Aztecs	14	17	14	7	52
Rebels	0	0	14	0	14

- Date: November 21, 2015
- Location: Sam Boyd Stadium
  Whitney, NV
- Game start: 7:34 p.m. PST
- Elapsed time: 3 hours and 30 minutes
- Game attendance: 14,738
- Game weather: Temperature: 54 °F (12 °C) • Weather: Clear and Cool • Wind: W 4 MPH
- Referee: Cooper Castleberry
- TV announcers (CBSSN): Carter Blackburn, Aaron Taylor and Jenny Dell (sideline)

Scoring summary
1	10:21	SDSU	Maxwell Smith 3–yard run (Donny Hageman kick)	SDSU 7–0
1	01:40	SDSU	Donnel Pumphrey 2–yard run (Donny Hageman kick)	SDSU 14–0
2	08:31	SDSU	Dakota Gordon 1–yard run (Donny Hageman kick)	SDSU 21–0
2	04:43	SDSU	Donnel Pumphrey 4–yard run (Donny Hageman kick)	SDSU 28–0
2	00:00	SDSU	Donny Hageman 29–yard field goal	SDSU 31–0
3	12:14	UNLV	Kendal Keys 14–yard pass from Kurt Palandech (Nicolai Bornand kick)	SDSU 31–7
3	07:57	SDSU	Chase Price 17–yard pass from Maxwell Smith (Donny Hageman kick)	SDSU 38–7
3	05:26	SDSU	Damontae Kazee 66–yard punt return (Donny Hageman kick)	SDSU 45–7
3	02:41	UNLV	Xzaviar Campbell 6–yard pass from Kurt Palandech (Nicolai Bornand kick)	SDSU 45–14
4	09:05	SDSU	Rashaad Penny 3–yard run (Donny Hageman kick)	SDSU 52–14

- Passing leaders: SDSU – Maxwell Smith, 11–17, 107 yards, 1 touchdown and UNLV – Kurt Palandech, 18–35, 190 yards, 2 touchdowns, 2 interceptions
- Rushing leaders: SDSU – Donnel Pumphrey, 14 carries, 139 yards, 2 touchdowns and UNLV – Lexington Thomas, 3 carries, 42 yards
- Receiving leaders: SDSU – Chase Price, 2 receptions, 30 yards, 1 touchdown and UNLV – Kendal Keys, 8 receptions, 76 yards, 1 touchdown
- Tackling leaders: SDSU – Calvin Munson, 9 tackles and UNLV – Kimble Jenson, 13 tackles

=== At Wyoming ===
UNLV at Wyoming

Team	1	2	3	4	Total
Rebels	7	0	7	14	28
• Cowboys	0	14	7	14	35

- Date: November 28, 2015
- Location: War Memorial Stadium
  Laramie, WY
- Game start: 12:07 p.m. MST
- Elapsed time: 3 hours and 8 minutes
- Game attendance: 11,149
- Game weather: Temperature: 18 °F (−8 °C) • Weather: Sunny • Wind: 0 MPH
- Referee: Brandon Cruse
- TV announcers (RTRM): Marc Stout, Sherdrick Bonner and Tori Holt (sideline)

Scoring summary
1	10:36	UNLV	Devonte Boyd 22–yard pass from Blake Decker (Nicolai Bornand kick)	UNLV 7–0
2	03:37	WYO	Brian Hill 72–yard run (Tristan Bailey kick)	TIE 7–7
2	00:06	WYO	James Price 35–yard pass from Cameron Coffman (Tristan Bailey kick)	WYO 14–7
3	06:37	WYO	Jake Maulhardt 19–yard pass from Cameron Coffman (Tristan Bailey kick)	WYO 21–7
3	02:15	UNLV	Kendal Keys 8–yard pass from Blake Decker (Nicolai Bornand kick)	WYO 21–14
4	11:29	UNLV	Brandon Presley 13–yard pass from Blake Decker (Nicolai Bornand kick)	TIE 21–21
4	06:04	WYO	Justin Berger 8–yard run (Tristan Bailey kick)	WYO 28–21
4	03:37	UNLV	Kurt Palandech 10–yard run (Nicolai Bornand kick)	TIE 28–28
4	02:20	WYO	Jacob Hollister 64–yard pass from Cameron Coffman (Tristan Bailey kick)	WYO 35–28

- Passing leaders: UNLV – Blake Decker, 18–33, 270 yards, 3 touchdowns, 1 interception and WYO – Cameron Coffman, 14–24, 248 yards, 3 touchdowns, 1 interception
- Rushing leaders: UNLV – Xzaviar Campbell, 9 carries, 87 yards and WYO – Brian Hill, 35 carries, 232 yards, 1 touchdown
- Receiving leaders: UNLV – Devonte Boyd, 6 receptions, 122 yards, 1 touchdown and WYO – Jacob Hollister, 5 receptions, 119 yards, 1 touchdown
- Tackling leaders: UNLV – Kimble Jensen, 14 tackles and WYO – Marcus Epps, 10 tackles
