= 2015 Mountain West Conference Football Championship Game =

2015 Sports Authority Mountain West Conference Football Championship Game
- Conference Championship
Air Force Falcons	San Diego State Aztecs
(8–4)	(9–3)
24	27
Head coach: Troy Calhoun	Head coach: Rocky Long
	1	2	3	4	Total
Air Force	7	3	7	7	24
San Diego State	0	10	7	10	27
- Date: December 5, 2015
- Season: 2015
- Stadium: Qualcomm Stadium
- Location: San Diego, California
- MVP: Offensive: Christian Chapman (QB, SDSU); Defensive: Na'im McGee (S, SDSU)
- Favorite: San Diego State by 4
- Attendance: 20,959

United States TV coverage
- Network: ESPN2
- Announcers: Mark Jones (play-by-play), Rod Gilmore (color) & Quint Kessenich (sideline)

2015 Mountain West Conference football standings
	Conf.			Overall
Team	W		L	W		L
Mountain Division
Air Force x	6	–	2	8	–	6
New Mexico	5	–	3	7	–	6
Utah State	5	–	3	6	–	7
Boise State	5	–	3	9	–	4
Colorado State	5	–	3	7	–	6
Wyoming	2	–	6	2	–	10
West Division
San Diego State x$	8	–	0	11	–	3
Nevada	4	–	4	7	–	6
San Jose State	4	–	4	6	–	7
Fresno State	2	–	6	3	–	9
UNLV	2	–	6	3	–	9
Hawaii	0	–	8	3	–	10
Championship: San Diego State 27, Air Force 24
$ – Conference champion; x – Division champion/co-champions; Rankings from AP Poll

The 2015 Sports Authority Mountain West Football Championship Game determined the 2015 football champion of the Mountain West Conference (MW).

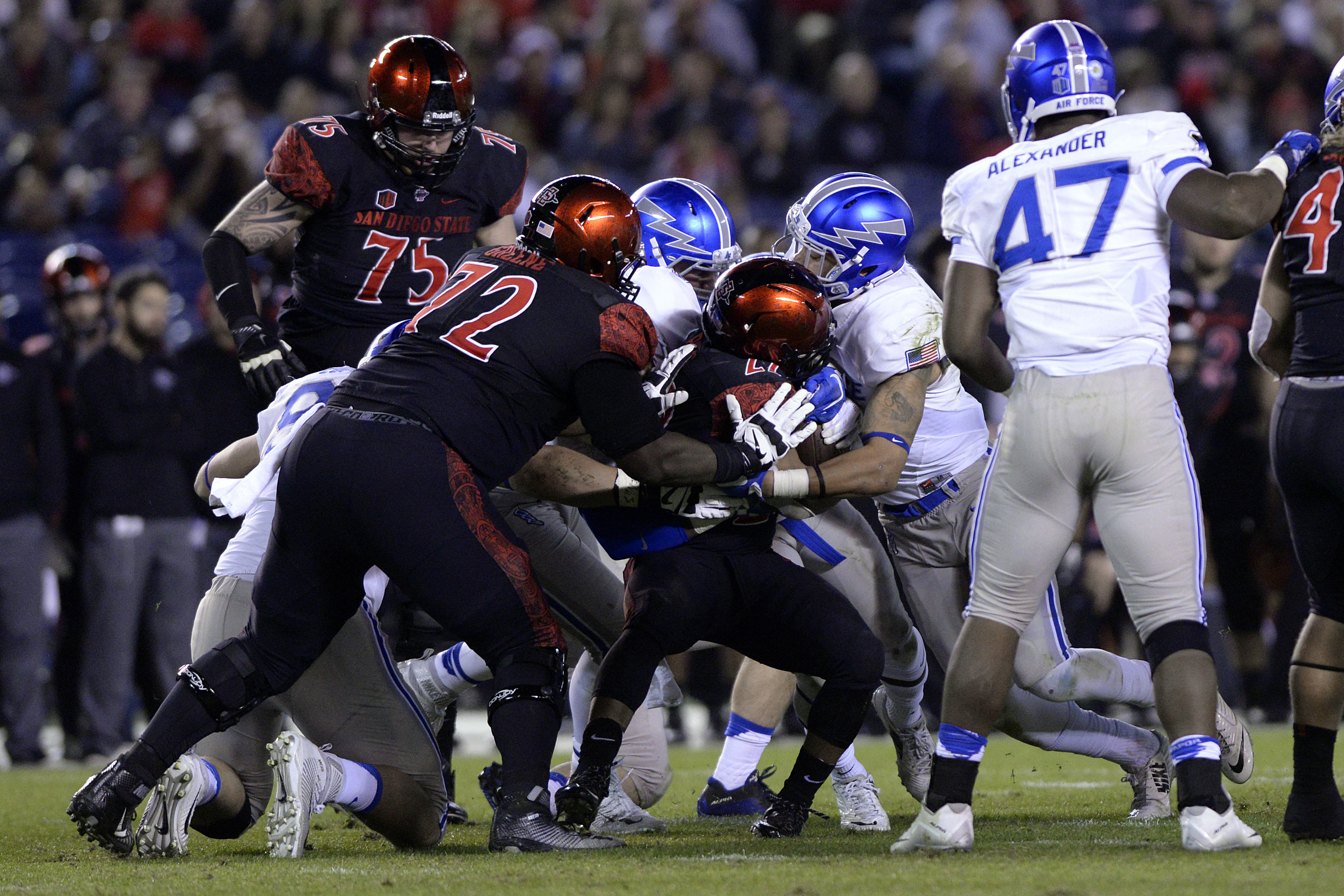
San Diego State running back Chase Price carries the ball during the game.

== History ==
After the 2013 phase of Mountain West Conference realignment, the league added two new members, San Jose State and Utah State for the 2013 season. By adding two new members for a total of 12 football members (11 all-sports members and football-only Hawaii), the MW was able to split into two divisions, the Mountain and the West, and to organize an annual conference championship game.

== Teams ==
=== Mountain Division Champions ===
This is Air Force's first appearance in the Championship

=== West Division Champions ===
This is San Diego State's first appearance in the Championship.

== Game Summary ==
=== Scoring Summary ===
Scoring summary

Quarter	Time	Drive			Team	Scoring information	Score	
Quarter	Time	Plays	Yards	TOP	Team	Scoring information	AF	SDSU
1	4:01	2	10	0:38	AF	Timothy McVey 8-yard touchdown run, Luke Strebel kick good	7	0
2	14:56	8	73	4:05	SDSU	Donnel Pumphrey 24-yard touchdown reception from Christian Chapman, Donny Hageman kick good	7	7
2	4:42	7	81	3:12	AF	21-yard field goal by Luke Strebel	10	7
2	1:44	7	58	2:58	SDSU	22-yard field goal by Donny Hageman	10	10
3	9:34	10	75	5:26	AF	Timothy McVey 3-yard touchdown run, Luke Strebel kick good	17	10
3	2:58	13	80	6:36	SDSU	Dakota Gordon 1-yard touchdown run, Donny Hageman kick good	17	17
4	14:22	4	74	1:42	SDSU	Rashaad Penny 28-yard touchdown run, Donny Hageman kick good	17	24
4	11:49	5	56	2:33	AF	Timothy McVey 2-yard touchdown run, Luke Strebel kick good	24	24
4	5:10	6	46	2:54	SDSU	46-yard field goal by Donny Hageman	24	27
"TOP" = time of possession. For other American football terms, see Glossary of American football.							24	27

=== Statistics ===
Statistics	AF	SDSU
First downs	14	17
Total offense, plays – yards	58–340	62–436
Rushes–yards (net)	46–305	46–233
Passing yards (net)	35	203
Passes, Comp–Att–Int	5–11–0	9–14–0
Time of Possession	28:44	31:16
