= 2015 Air Force Falcons football team =

American college football season

2015 Air Force Falcons football

MW Mountain Division champion

MW Championship Game, L 24–27 at San Diego State

Armed Forces Bowl, L 36–55 vs. California
- Conference: Mountain West Conference
- Mountain Division
- Record: 8–6 (6–2 MW)
- Head coach: Troy Calhoun (9th season)
- Offensive coordinator: Mike Thiessen (7th season)
- Offensive scheme: Triple option
- Defensive coordinator: Steve Russ (4th season)
- Base defense: 3–4
- Captains: Alex Hansen; A. J. Ruechel; Connor Healy
- Home stadium: Falcon Stadium

2015 Mountain West Conference football standings
	Conf.			Overall
Team	W		L	W		L
Mountain Division
Air Force x	6	–	2	8	–	6
New Mexico	5	–	3	7	–	6
Utah State	5	–	3	6	–	7
Boise State	5	–	3	9	–	4
Colorado State	5	–	3	7	–	6
Wyoming	2	–	6	2	–	10
West Division
San Diego State x$	8	–	0	11	–	3
Nevada	4	–	4	7	–	6
San Jose State	4	–	4	6	–	7
Fresno State	2	–	6	3	–	9
UNLV	2	–	6	3	–	9
Hawaii	0	–	8	3	–	10
Championship: San Diego State 27, Air Force 24
$ – Conference champion; x – Division champion/co-champions; Rankings from AP Poll

The 2015 Air Force Falcons football team represented the United States Air Force Academy as a member of the Mountain Division in the Mountain West Conference (MW) during the 2015 NCAA Division I FBS football season. Led by ninth-year head coach Troy Calhoun, the Falcons compiled an overall record of 8–6 with a mark of 6–2 in conference play, winning the MW's Mountain Division title. Air Force advanced to the Mountain West Championship Game, where the Falcons lost to San Diego State. They were then invited to the Armed Forces Bowl, losing there to California. The team played home games at Falcon Stadium in Colorado Springs, Colorado

== Schedule ==
Date	Time	Opponent	Site	TV	Result	Attendance
September 5	1:30 p.m.	Morgan State*	Falcon Stadium; Colorado Springs, CO	RTRM	W 63–7	33,734
September 12	8:15 p.m.	San Jose State	Falcon Stadium; Colorado Springs, CO	ESPNU	W 37–16	22,389
September 19	10:00 a.m.	at No. 4 Michigan State*	Spartan Stadium; East Lansing, MI	ABC	L 21–35	74,211
October 3	1:30 p.m.	at Navy*	Navy–Marine Corps Memorial Stadium; Annapolis, MD (Commander-in-Chief's Trophy)	CBSSN	L 11–33	32,705
October 10	8:15 p.m.	Wyoming	Falcon Stadium; Colorado Springs, CO	ESPN2	W 31–17	22,023
October 17	1:30 p.m.	at Colorado State	Hughes Stadium; Fort Collins, CO (rivalry)	CBSSN	L 23–38	32,546
October 24	12:00 p.m.	Fresno State	Falcon Stadium; Colorado Springs, CO	ESPN3	W 42–14	20,213
October 31	6:30 p.m.	at Hawaii	Aloha Stadium; Halawa, HI (rivalry)	CBSSN	W 58–7	22,430
November 7	1:30 p.m.	Army*	Falcon Stadium; Colorado Springs, CO (Commander-in-Chief's Trophy)	ESPNU	W 20–3	37,716
November 14	12:00 p.m.	Utah State	Falcon Stadium; Colorado Springs, CO	ESPN3	W 35–28	20,083
November 20	7:30 p.m.	at Boise State	Albertsons Stadium; Boise, ID	ESPN2	W 37–30	30,332
November 28	8:15 p.m.	at New Mexico	University Stadium; Albuquerque, NM	ESPNU	L 35–47	18,868
December 5	5:30 p.m.	at San Diego State	Qualcomm Stadium; San Diego, CA (MW Championship Game)	ESPN2	L 24–27	20,959
December 29	12:00 p.m.	vs. California*	Amon G. Carter Stadium; Fort Worth, TX (Armed Forces Bowl)	ESPN	L 36–55	38,915
*Non-conference game; Rankings from AP Poll released prior to the game; All times are in Mountain time

== Game summaries ==
=== Morgan State ===
	1	2	3	4	Total
Bears	0	7	0	0	7
Falcons	7	21	28	7	63

=== San Jose State ===
	1	2	3	4	Total
Spartans	7	0	9	0	16
Falcons	7	7	3	20	37

=== At Michigan State ===
	1	2	3	4	Total
Falcons	7	0	7	7	21
No.4 Spartans	14	14	7	0	35

=== At Navy ===
	1	2	3	4	Total
Falcons	0	0	3	8	11
Midshipmen	7	14	6	6	33

=== Wyoming ===
	1	2	3	4	Total
Cowboys	0	3	0	14	17
Falcons	0	7	7	17	31

=== At Colorado State ===
	1	2	3	4	Total
Falcons	6	7	0	10	23
Rams	14	7	14	3	38

=== Fresno State ===
	1	2	3	4	Total
Bulldogs	14	0	0	0	14
Falcons	7	14	14	7	42

=== At Hawaii ===
	1	2	3	4	Total
Falcons	14	20	3	21	58
Rainbow Warriors	0	0	0	7	7

=== Army ===
	1	2	3	4	Total
Black Knights	0	0	3	0	3
Falcons	0	10	0	10	20

=== Utah State ===
	1	2	3	4	Total
Aggies	14	0	14	0	28
Falcons	14	7	14	0	35

=== At Boise State ===
	1	2	3	4	Total
Falcons	3	21	10	3	37
Broncos	13	0	7	10	30

=== At New Mexico ===
	1	2	3	4	Total
Falcons	7	7	7	14	35
Lobos	14	17	3	13	47

=== Mountain West Championship Game–at San Diego State ===
	1	2	3	4	Total
Falcons	7	3	7	7	24
Aztecs	0	10	7	10	27

=== Armed Forces Bowl–California ===
	1	2	3	4	Total
Golden Bears	14	21	17	3	55
Falcons	7	14	8	7	36
