= ESPN College Football =

Television franchise series

- Current ESPN CFB logo, in use since 2025
- Also known as: ABC College Football
- Genre: American college football game telecasts
- Presented by: Various commentators
- Country of origin: United States
- Original language: English
- No. of seasons: 45 (through 2026 season)

Production
- Production locations: Various NCAA stadiums (game telecasts); ESPN Headquarters; Bristol, Connecticut, U.S. (pre-game, halftime and post-game shows); ABC and ESPN Studio; 7 Hudson Square, Manhattan, New York City (alternate pre-game, halftime and post-game shows)
- Camera setup: Multi-camera
- Running time: 210 minutes or until game ends (inc. adverts)
- Production companies: National Collegiate Athletic Association; ESPN

Original release
- Network: ESPN
- Release: December 11, 1982 – present
- Network: ABC
- Release: September 2, 2006 – present

Related
- College Football Countdown; College GameDay; Saturday Night Football

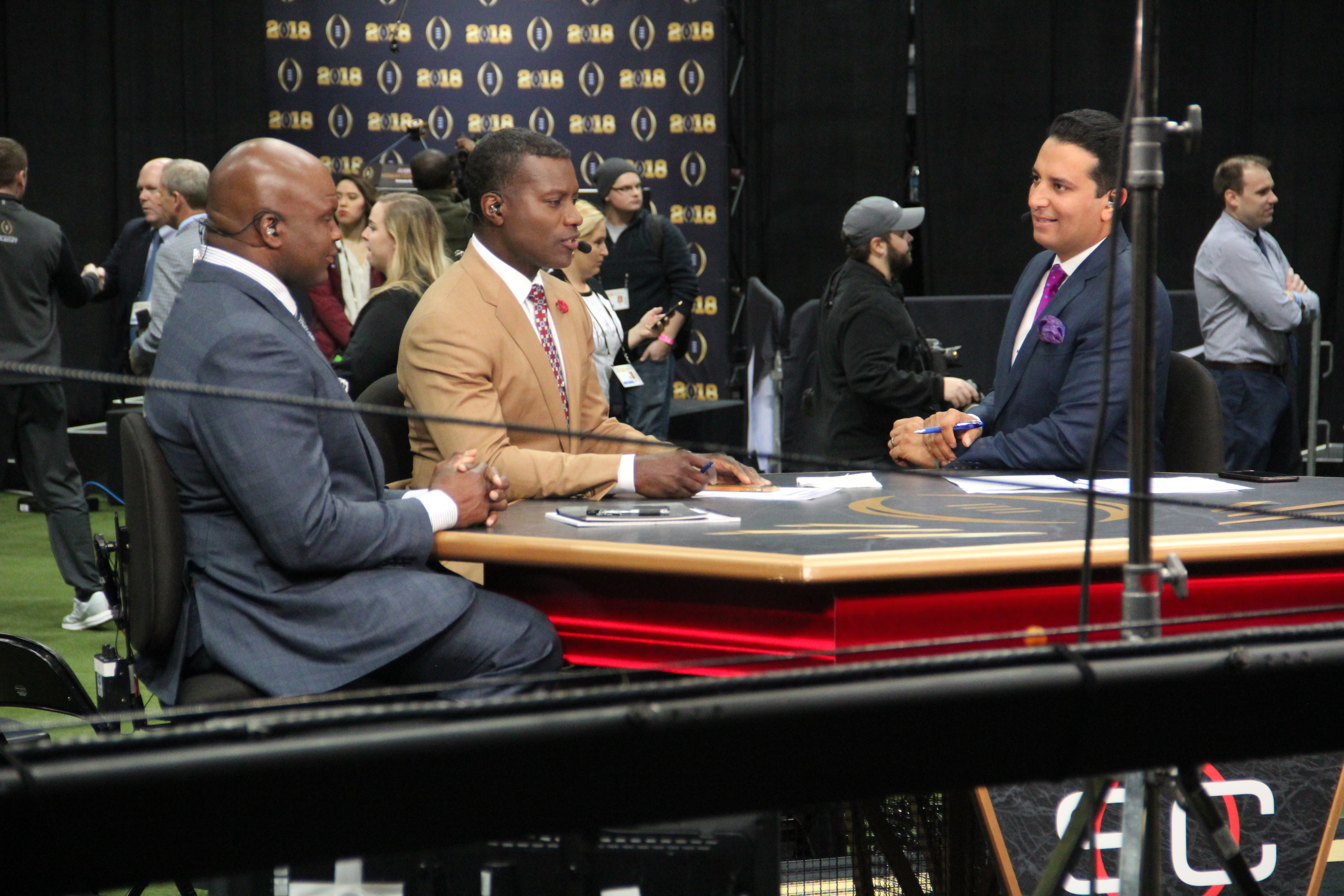
ESPN College Football at Philips Arena for the 2018 College Football Playoff National Championship media day

ESPN College Football is the presentation used for broadcasts of NCAA college football games across The Walt Disney Company properties including ABC, ESPN, ESPN DTC, ESPN+, ESPN2, ESPNews, ESPN Classic, ACC Network, SEC Network, ESPN Deportes and ESPN Radio. ESPN College Football debuted on December 11, 1982.

ESPN College Football consists of four to five games a week, with ESPN College Football Primetime, which airs at 7:30 on Thursdays. Saturday include 12:00 game, a 3:30 or 4:30 game that is not shown on a weekly basis, and ESPN College Football Primetime on Saturday. A Sunday game, Sunday Showdown, was added for the first half of 2006 to make up for the loss of Sunday Night Football to NBC.

ESPN also produces College Football on ABC and Saturday Night Football in separate broadcast packages.

The American, ACC, Big 12, Conference USA, MAC, SEC and Sun Belt are all covered by ESPN. Through its online arm ESPN3 and the ESPN+ streaming service, ESPN carries a wide variety of other athletic conferences and games at lower divisions, spanning the full breadth of college football.

== History ==
ESPN began airing taped college football games during the 1979 regular season, starting with a game between Colorado and Oregon. The network was limited to airing tape-delayed games because the NCAA controlled television rights through exclusive contracts. However, because bowl games operate outside the control of the NCAA, ESPN was able to air the 1982 Independence Bowl between Kansas State and Wisconsin live (through a simulcast with the Mizlou Television Network) – the first live football game televised on ESPN.

After the 1984 Supreme Court decision in NCAA v. Board of Regents of the University of Oklahoma allowed individual schools to negotiate television rights, ESPN began broadcasting live regular-season games during the 1984 season, beginning with a game between BYU and Pittsburgh on September 1, 1984. The first live broadcast of a regular-season night game followed that night, between the Florida Gators, who were ranked number 17, and the Miami Hurricanes, who were ranked number 10.

In recent years, ESPN and ESPN2 air games at noon, which usually includes a Big Ten game. Both networks also air primetime games, typically featuring teams from the ACC or SEC.

With the expansion of ESPN, including multiple networks and outlets, their coverage has likewise increased. In 2005, with the creation of ESPNU, over 300 games were aired on its networks.

In 2007, the ESPN family of networks aired over 450 games. Also, they aired a weekly game on ESPN Radio for the first time ever. ESPN started that season with 25 hours of college football programming.

Also, ESPNU has rapidly increased the coverage of spring intramural team scrimmages with entire programs dedicated to this phenomenon. In 2008, ESPN aired College GameDay from Florida Field prior to their spring scrimmage game.

Starting with the 2007 season, ESPN began sublicensing games from Fox Sports Net, with the Big 12 Conference (later extended until 2009) and with the Pacific-10 Conference. However, the games cannot air during the "reverse mirror" slot.

During the 2008 season, ESPN aired over 400 games.

Beginning in the 2010 season, ESPN acquired exclusive broadcast rights to the Bowl Championship Series in a four-year contract, where all games in the BCS would be aired on ESPN.

Also in 2010, the company launched ESPN Goal Line, a gametime-only channel that switches between games to show the most interesting plays, similar to NFL RedZone.

In 2012, ESPN reached long-term, 12-year agreements to retain rights to the Rose Bowl, Orange Bowl, and Sugar Bowl following the dissolution of the Bowl Championship Series. In November, ESPN reached a 12-year deal to broadcast the remainder of the new College Football Playoff system, valued at around $470 million per-year, giving it continued rights to the Peach Bowl and Fiesta Bowl, as well as the Cotton Bowl Classic and the College Football Playoff National Championship.

For the 2014–15 postseason, ESPN implemented a major overhaul of its on-air presentation and branding for college football, with flat design and a score box in the bottom-right of the screen. The graphics soft launched during the New Orleans Bowl, and formally debuted alongside new graphics and theme music during the inaugural College Football Playoff games.

In 2017, ESPN renewed its rights to the Big Ten, but lost its tier 1 rights to Big Ten football to Fox Sports, meaning that it no longer has the first choices of games each week.

In 2019, ESPN began a 12-year deal with the American Athletic Conference, with at least 40 football games on ESPN linear networks and ABC per-season, and all other content on ESPN+. ESPN+ also acquired the third-tier media rights to most Big 12 teams, besides the Texas Longhorns (who had a partnership with ESPN and Learfield on Longhorn Network) and Oklahoma Sooners (which had a partnership with Fox Sports Oklahoma). ESPN+ eventually acquired the Sooners' rights in 2022, in an agreement that would last through its exit to the SEC in 2024.

ESPN revamped its on-air presentation for college football again for the 2020 season, with new logos and graphics carrying a "test facility" theme, and a scoreboard along the bottom of the screen reminiscent of Monday Night Football. In December 2020, ESPN announced a 10-year, $3 billion contract to hold the top media rights for the SEC beginning in 2024, ending its long-standing agreement with CBS, and seeing its flagship package of games move to ABC.

In August 2022, it was reported that ESPN had backed out of negotiations to renew its rights to Big Ten athletics after the 2022 season, ending a relationship dating back to 1982. The Big Ten ultimately signed with Fox, CBS (where its Big Ten package effectively replaced its SEC package in 2024), and NBC, with all three networks holding shares of its college football and basketball rights. In October 2022, ESPN and Fox renewed their rights to the Big 12 under a six-year deal through the 2030–31 season.

In 2024, ESPN began to soft launch a revamp of its college football on-air presentation and branding, beginning with new graphics specific to SEC games, a related design for College Football Playoff broadcasts, followed by a new full-time package for all other games and studio shows beginning in 2025. All three packages switched to centered scoreboards (with the CFP housing it within a banner, and the SEC and other games using a standalone "pod"), and heavily incorporating sidebars (known internally as "blitz towers", and also adopted by Monday Night Football) for statistics graphics to take advantage of the 16:9 aspect ratio. The new ESPN College Football branding shifted from the more "cinematic" look of the 2020 package to a more vibrant, stadium-themed design intended to "encapsulate the college football atmosphere from fans to game to just fandom as a whole".

== Programs ==
- College Football Live - Daily program during the season and weekly show in the offseason
- College GameDay - Weekly show (in-season) from the site of the biggest game of the day or significance
- College Football Final - Saturday show reviewing the highlights of the days and the biggest stories
- College Football Scoreboard - show providing scores, highlights, pre-game and post-game interviews, and check-ins of games of interest
- College Football Countdown - show counting viewers down to kickoff of the Thursday primetime games, sometimes Friday primetime games, and special events not covered on College GameDay

ESPNU programs

- ESPNU Inside The Polls
- ESPNU Coaches Spotlight
- ESPNU Recruiting Insider

=== Former programs ===
- Thursday GameNight (formerly the Weekend Kickoff Show)

== Coverage ==
ESPN airs Spring Football games and coverage. Coverage includes College Football Final which wraps the annual Spring Games.

During the regular season, ESPN airs pre-selected Thursday night marquee matchups. ESPN2 airs pre-selected Friday night contests from lesser known Division I schools. In late October and November, games almost exclusively from the Mid-American Conference air on Tuesdays or Wednesdays, usually on ESPN2.

The weekend games with the exception of the regular season are typically selected a week or two weeks out. ABC gets the first pick of games for all the major conferences, which, since 2024, has primarily been the top three games from the SEC, which the network took over broadcast rights from CBS.

ESPN/ESPN2 formerly aired coverage of ABC games in a "reverse mirror" format. Both networks will also air other selected midweek games and Sunday games, typically teams from more “minor” conferences (Sunday games are exceptionally rare because of conflicts with ESPN Sunday Night Baseball and the network's professional football coverage, both NFL and Canadian football).

ESPN Radio airs a weekly game as well as selected College Football Playoff bowl games including all bowl and national championship games.

ESPNU usually airs 5 games per week.

Before its closure in December 2021, ESPN Classic aired selected games throughout the year.

=== Typical games ===
ESPN's Saturdays during the regular season begin at 9:00 AM ET with College GameDay, a three-hour live show that previews the day's games. This counts down to the first set of games for the day, which begin at noon ET on ABC, ESPN, and ESPN2. Another set of games will begin across those three networks around 3:30 PM, including an SEC game on ABC. At the conclusion of the second game, Saturday Night Football on ABC games are presented each Saturday evening starting at 7:30 p.m. during the college football regular season, which has been the case since 2017. College Football Saturday Primetime starts around 7:00, as does another game on ESPN2. Late-night games begin on ESPN and ESPN2 around 10:30 ET, in prime time on the west coast.

Modelo Kickoff Week is the first weekend of the college football season. Games include the Aflac Kickoff Game, Duke's Mayo Classic, and other non-conference action. One game will air on ABC on Sunday night, and a second game will air on ESPN on Labor Day night. After the first week of the college football season, the NFL season begins, and so these windows are filled with NBC's Sunday Night Football and ESPN's Monday Night Football, respectively.

During the season, ESPN will designate one of its games as the Dr. Pepper Championship Drive Game of the Week. Typically featuring matchups of ranked opponents or compelling games (conference or non-conference), these are typically featured for games on ABC or ESPN.

Dr. Pepper Championship Week always features the MAC Championship Game and Sun Belt Conference Football Championship Game on ESPN, while the ACC Championship Game, SEC Championship Game, Big 12 Championship Game, and American Conference Football Championship Game are shown on ABC. Previously it has featured the WAC Championship Game, the C-USA Championship Game, and the Pac-12 Championship game every other year from 2013 to 2017 on ESPN, and from 2019 to 2023 on ABC.

The ESPN family of networks air the Division I FCS conference playoffs as well as the Division II and III championship games.

ESPN and ABC air the bulk of the bowl games, branded as ‘‘Capital One Bowl Mania’’ (formerly "Capital One Bowl Week", which contrary to its name extended to well over two calendar weeks because of the huge number of bowls, many created by ESPN's own event division, the networks air).

Through the network's online arms and ESPN+, the ESPN networks cover the breadth of almost all levels of college football.

== Nielsen ratings ==
=== Conference Championship Games since 2015 ===
Year	Conference	Matchup				Network	Viewers (millions)	TV Ratings
2015	Pac-12	#20 USC	22	#7 Stanford	41	ESPN	2.6	1.6
2015	AAC	#22 Temple	13	#19 Houston	24	ABC	2.5	1.8
2015	MAC	Bowling Green	34	Northern Illinois	14	ESPN2	1.0	0.7
2015	C-USA	Southern Miss	28	Western Kentucky	45	ESPN2	0.49	N/A
2015	MWC	Air Force	24	San Diego State	27	ESPN2	0.36	N/A
2016	ACC	#3 Clemson	42	#23 Virginia Tech	35	ABC	5.34	3.2
2016	AAC	#19 Navy	10	Temple	34	ABC	2.05	1.4
2016	MAC	#17 Western Michigan	29	Ohio	23	ESPN2	1.36	0.3
2016	C-USA	Western Kentucky	58	Louisiana Tech	44	ESPN	0.93	0.6
2016	MW	San Diego State	27	Wyoming	24	ESPN	0.71	0.4
2017	ACC	#7 Miami	3	No. 1 Clemson	38	ABC	5.43	3.2
2017	Pac-12	#12 Stanford	28	#10 USC	31	ESPN	3.66	2.3
2017	AAC	#20 Memphis	55	#14 UCF	62	ABC	3.39	2.3
2017	MAC	Akron	28	Toledo	45	ESPN	0.65	0.5
2017	MW	#25 Fresno State	14	Boise State	17	ESPN	0.62	0.4
2017	C-USA	North Texas	17	Florida Atlantic	41	ESPN2	0.26	n.a.
2018	Big 12	#14 Texas	27	#5 Oklahoma	39	ABC	10.2	6.2
2018	ACC	#2 Clemson	42	Pittsburgh	10	ABC	4.2	2.5
2018	AAC	Memphis	41	#8 UCF	56	ABC	3.3	2.1
2018	MW	#25 Fresno State	19	#22 Boise State	16	ESPN	1.0	0.6
2018	Sun Belt	Louisiana	19	Appalachian State	30	ESPN	0.90	0.6
2018	MAC	Northern Illinois	30	Buffalo	29	ESPN2	0.59	0.4
2019	Big 12	#7 Baylor	23	#6 Oklahoma	30	ABC	8.70	5.5
2019	Pac-12	#5 Utah	15	#13 Oregon	37	ABC	5.86	3.5
2019	ACC	#23 Virginia	17	#3 Clemson	62	ABC	3.97	2.4
2019	AAC	#20 Cincinnati	24	#17 Memphis	29	ABC	2.88	1.9
2019	Sun Belt	Louisiana	38	#21 Appalachian State	45	ESPN	0.73	0.5
2019	MW	Hawaii	10	#19 Boise State	31	ESPN	0.55	0.4
2019	MAC	Miami (OH)	26	Central Michigan	21	ESPN2	0.36	0.2
2020	ACC	#3 Clemson	34	#2 Notre Dame	10	ABC	9.92	5.5
2020	Big 12	#10 Oklahoma	27	#6 Iowa State	21	ABC	2.99	1.8
2020	AAC	#23 Tulsa	24	#9 Cincinnati	27	ABC	1.88	1.1
2020	MAC	Ball State	38	#23 Buffalo	28	ESPN	0.88	0.4
2020	Sun Belt	Canceled due to COVID-19						
2021	Big 12	#9 Baylor	21	#5 Oklahoma State	16	ABC	8.02	4.8
2021	Pac-12	#10 Oregon	10	#17 Utah	38	ABC	4.25	2.5
2021	AAC	#21 Houston	20	#4 Cincinnati	35	ABC	3.42	2.0
2021	ACC	#15 Pittsburgh	45	#16 Wake Forest	21	ABC	2.66	1.5
2021	MAC	Kent State	23	Northern Illinois	41	ESPN	0.88	0.6
2021	Sun Belt	Appalachian State	16	#24 Louisiana	24	ESPN	0.44	0.3

== Non-game action ==
=== College GameDay ===
ESPN airs College GameDay. Since 1993 and almost exclusively in recent years, it has aired from the top game of the week or one of significance. For the 2010 season, the show was expanded to three hours, with the first hour airing on ESPNU.

=== Home Depot College Football Awards ===
Since 1990, ESPN has aired the show live from the Boardwalk in Orlando, Florida. The show airs several awards.

=== Heisman Trophy Presentation ===
Since 1994, ESPN has aired the Heisman Trophy from New York City. It is typically an hour-long program featuring interviews with past winners and nominees (with their families or coaches).

== See also ==
- ESPNU College Football
- ESPN College Football on ABC
  - Saturday Night Football
- ESPN Plus
