= 2015 Minnesota Golden Gophers football team =

American college football season

2015 Minnesota Golden Gophers football

Quick Lane Bowl champion

Quick Lane Bowl, W 21–14 vs. Central Michigan
- Conference: Big Ten Conference
- West Division
- Record: 6–7 (2–6 Big Ten)
- Head coach: Jerry Kill (5th season; first 7 games); Tracy Claeys (remainder of season)
- Offensive coordinator: Matt Limegrover (5th season)
- Offensive scheme: Spread
- Defensive coordinator: Tracy Claeys (5th season)
- Base defense: 4–3
- Captains: K. J. Maye; Mitch Leidner; Briean Boddy-Calhoun; Eric Murray
- Home stadium: TCF Bank Stadium

2015 Big Ten Conference football standings
	Conf.			Overall
Team	W		L	W		L
East Division
No. 6 Michigan State xy$^	7	–	1	12	–	2
No. 4 Ohio State x	7	–	1	12	–	1
No. 12 Michigan	6	–	2	10	–	3
Penn State	4	–	4	7	–	6
Indiana	2	–	6	6	–	7
Rutgers	1	–	7	4	–	8
Maryland	1	–	7	3	–	9
West Division
No. 9 Iowa xy	8	–	0	12	–	2
No. 23 Northwestern	6	–	2	10	–	3
No. 21 Wisconsin	6	–	2	10	–	3
Nebraska	3	–	5	6	–	7
Minnesota	2	–	6	6	–	7
Illinois	2	–	6	5	–	7
Purdue	1	–	7	2	–	10
Championship: Michigan State 16, Iowa 13
^ – College Football Playoff participant; $ – Conference champion; x – Division champion/co-champions; y – Championship game participant; Rankings from AP Poll

The 2015 Minnesota Golden Gophers football team represented the University of Minnesota in the 2015 NCAA Division I FBS football season. The Gophers played their home games at TCF Bank Stadium. They were a member of the West Division of the Big Ten Conference. Minnesota finished the regular season with a record of 5–7, 2–6 in Big Ten play to finish in a tie for fifth place in the West Division. Despite finishing below .500, the Gophers were invited to the Quick Lane Bowl versus Central Michigan due to there not being enough bowl eligible teams and Minnesota's high Academic Performance Rating. Minnesota defeated Central Michigan 21–14 to finish the season 6–7.

They were led by fifth-year head coach Jerry Kill, who resigned on October 28 for health reasons. Defensive coordinator Tracy Claeys replaced Kill on an interim basis and was named head coach two weeks later on November 11.

== Recruiting ==
College recruiting information
Name	Hometown	School	Height	Weight	40^{‡}	Commit date
Beebe, Colton; FB	Kansas City, KS	Piper HS	6 ft 3 in (1.91 m)	248 lb (112 kg)	4.75	Dec 17, 2014
Beebe, Colton; FB	Recruit ratings: Scout: Rivals: 247Sports: (71)					
Brooks, Shannon; RB	Jasper, GA	Pickens County HS	5 ft 11 in (1.80 m)	201 lb (91 kg)	4.56	Sep 11, 2014
Brooks, Shannon; RB	Recruit ratings: Scout: Rivals: 247Sports: (73)					
Buford, Ray; ATH	Southfield, MI	Southfield HS	6 ft 1 in (1.85 m)	193 lb (88 kg)	4.65	Jul 19, 2014
Buford, Ray; ATH	Recruit ratings: Scout: Rivals: 247Sports: (75)					
Connelly, Nick; OL	Red Wing, MN	Red Wing HS	6 ft 7 in (2.01 m)	269 lb (122 kg)	5.04	Jun 24, 2014
Connelly, Nick; OL	Recruit ratings: Scout: Rivals: 247Sports: (72)					
Craighton, Alonzo; DB	Geismar, LA	Dutchtown HS	6 ft 1 in (1.85 m)	184 lb (83 kg)	4.60	Oct 13, 2014
Craighton, Alonzo; DB	Recruit ratings: Scout: Rivals: 247Sports: (77)					
Croft, Demry; QB	Rockford, IL	Boylan Catholic HS	6 ft 5 in (1.96 m)	192 lb (87 kg)	4.66	Jun 30, 2014
Croft, Demry; QB	Recruit ratings: Scout: Rivals: 247Sports: (73)					
DeLattiboudere, Winston; DL	Ellicott City, MD	Howard HS	6 ft 3 in (1.91 m)	217 lb (98 kg)	4.78	Feb 1, 2015
DeLattiboudere, Winston; DL	Recruit ratings: Scout: Rivals: 247Sports: (NR)					
Dovich, Bronson; OL	Chaska, MN	Chaska HS	6 ft 5 in (1.96 m)	290 lb (130 kg)	N/A	May 30, 2014
Dovich, Bronson; OL	Recruit ratings: Scout: Rivals: 247Sports: (74)					
Femi-Cole, Jonathan; RB	Aurora, ON, CN	St. Andrew's College	6 ft 0 in (1.83 m)	218 lb (99 kg)	4.59	Jul 19, 2014
Femi-Cole, Jonathan; RB	Recruit ratings: Scout: Rivals: 247Sports: (74)					
Hall, Mose; DL	Mobile, AL	Murphy HS	6 ft 4 in (1.93 m)	253 lb (115 kg)	5.03	Jan 27, 2015
Hall, Mose; DL	Recruit ratings: Scout: Rivals: 247Sports: (72)					
Hardin, Kiante; ATH	Webb City, MO	Webb City HS	5 ft 10 in (1.78 m)	160 lb (73 kg)	4.55	Oct 14, 2014
Hardin, Kiante; ATH	Recruit ratings: Scout: Rivals: 247Sports: (72)					
Huff, Jacob; DB	Bolingbrook, IL	Bolingbrook HS	5 ft 10 in (1.78 m)	201 lb (91 kg)	4.65	Jun 5, 2014
Huff, Jacob; DB	Recruit ratings: Scout: Rivals: 247Sports: (76)					
Huff, Julian; LB	Bolingbrook, IL	Bolingbrook HS	5 ft 11 in (1.80 m)	215 lb (98 kg)	4.70	Jun 5, 2014
Huff, Julian; LB	Recruit ratings: Scout: Rivals: 247Sports: (75)					
Johannesson, James; RB	Fargo, ND	Fargo South HS	6 ft 1 in (1.85 m)	216 lb (98 kg)	4.55	Aug 22, 2014
Johannesson, James; RB	Recruit ratings: Scout: Rivals: 247Sports: (73)					
Johnson, Dior; DB	Southfield, MI	Southfield HS	6 ft 2 in (1.88 m)	195 lb (88 kg)	N/A	Jan 28, 2015
Johnson, Dior; DB	Recruit ratings: Scout: Rivals: 247Sports: (75)					
Moore, Tyler; OL	Houston, TX	North Shore HS	6 ft 5 in (1.96 m)	317 lb (144 kg)	N/A	Dec 16, 2014
Moore, Tyler; OL	Recruit ratings: Scout: Rivals: 247Sports: (77)					
Oseland, Quinn; OL	Springfield, IL	Sacred Heart Griffin HS	6 ft 6 in (1.98 m)	303 lb (137 kg)	5.53	Aug 13, 2014
Oseland, Quinn; OL	Recruit ratings: Scout: Rivals: 247Sports: (76)					
Register, Hunter; WR	Lafayette, LA	Ovey Comeaux HS	6 ft 4 in (1.93 m)	191 lb (87 kg)	4.58	Jan 21, 2015
Register, Hunter; WR	Recruit ratings: Scout: Rivals: 247Sports: (74)					
Rogers, Charlie; DB	Iowa City, IA	Iowa Western CC (JC)	6 ft 1 in (1.85 m)	208 lb (94 kg)	4.47	Dec 3, 2014
Rogers, Charlie; DB	Recruit ratings: Scout: Rivals: 247Sports: (78)					
Shenault, Antonio; DB	Roselle, IL	Lake Park HS	5 ft 11 in (1.80 m)	180 lb (82 kg)	4.61	Oct 9, 2014
Shenault, Antonio; DB	Recruit ratings: Scout: Rivals: 247Sports: (72)					
Stieber, Ted; OL	Akron, OH	Archbishop Hoban HS	6 ft 6 in (1.98 m)	298 lb (135 kg)	5.86	Jun 18, 2014
Stieber, Ted; OL	Recruit ratings: Scout: Rivals: 247Sports: (74)					
Still, Rashad; WR	El Paso, TX	Andress HS	6 ft 5 in (1.96 m)	200 lb (91 kg)	4.50	Jan 24, 2015
Still, Rashad; WR	Recruit ratings: Scout: Rivals: 247Sports: (79)					
Waters, Jaylen; LB	Copperas Cove, TX	Copperas Cove HS	6 ft 2 in (1.88 m)	230 lb (100 kg)	4.63	Jul 21, 2014
Waters, Jaylen; LB	Recruit ratings: Scout: Rivals: 247Sports: (77)					
Witham, Bryce; TE	Grand Rapids, MI	West Catholic HS	6 ft 4 in (1.93 m)	240 lb (110 kg)	4.68	Jan 26, 2015
Witham, Bryce; TE	Recruit ratings: Scout: Rivals: 247Sports: (73)					
Overall recruit ranking: Scout: 56 Rivals: 52 247Sports: 63 ESPN: 62
‡ Refers to 40-yard dash; Note: In many cases, Scout, Rivals, 247Sports, On3, and ESPN may conflict in their listings of height, weight and 40 time.; In these cases, the average was taken. ESPN grades are on a 100-point scale.; Sources: "Yahoo Sports: Rivals.com 2015 Minnesota Commitments". Rivals.; "Scout.com 2015 Minnesota Commitments". Scout.; "ESPN 2015 Minnesota Commitments". ESPN.; "Scout.com Team Recruiting Rankings". Scout.; "2015 Team Ranking". Rivals.com.

== Schedule ==
Minnesota faced all six Big Ten West Division opponents: Illinois, Iowa, Nebraska, Northwestern, Purdue, and Wisconsin. The Gophers also faced Big Ten East Division opponents Michigan and Ohio State. Minnesota played four non-conference games: TCU of the Big 12 Conference, Colorado State of the Mountain West Conference, and Kent State and Ohio of the Mid-American Conference. Minnesota had one bye week during the season between their games against Nebraska and Michigan.

Date	Time	Opponent	Site	TV	Result	Attendance	Source
September 3	8:00 pm	No. 2 TCU*	TCF Bank Stadium; Minneapolis, MN	ESPN	L 17–23	54,147	
September 12	2:30 pm	at Colorado State*	Hughes Stadium; Fort Collins, CO	CBSSN	W 23–20 ^{OT}	32,500	
September 19	11:00 am	Kent State*	TCF Bank Stadium; Minneapolis, MN	BTN	W 10–7	52,823	
September 26	2:30 pm	Ohio*^{†}	TCF Bank Stadium; Minneapolis, MN	BTN	W 27–24	53,917	
October 3	11:00 am	at No. 16 Northwestern	Ryan Field; Evanston, IL	BTN	L 0–27	30,044	
October 10	2:30 pm	at Purdue	Ross–Ade Stadium; West Lafayette, IN	ESPNU	W 41–13	33,780	
October 17	2:30 pm	Nebraska	TCF Bank Stadium; Minneapolis, MN (rivalry)	ESPN2	L 25–48	54,062	
October 31	6:00 pm	No. 15 Michigan	TCF Bank Stadium; Minneapolis, MN (Little Brown Jug)	ESPN	L 26–29	50,789	
November 7	7:00 pm	at No. 1 Ohio State	Ohio Stadium; Columbus, OH	ABC	L 14–28	108,075	
November 14	7:00 pm	at No. 8 Iowa	Kinnick Stadium; Iowa City, IA (rivalry)	BTN	L 35–40	70,585	
November 21	11:00 am	Illinois	TCF Bank Stadium; Minneapolis, MN	ESPNews	W 32–23	47,976	
November 28	2:30 pm	Wisconsin	TCF Bank Stadium; Minneapolis, MN (rivalry)	BTN	L 21–31	52,850	
December 28	4:00 pm	vs. Central Michigan*	Ford Field; Detroit, MI (Quick Lane Bowl)	ESPN2	W 21–14	34,217	
*Non-conference game; ^{†}Homecoming; Rankings from AP Poll released prior to the game; All times are in Central time

== Roster ==
2015 Minnesota Golden Gophers football team roster
Players
Coaches
Offense

Pos.	#	Name	Class
WR	1	K. J. Maye (C)	Sr
WR	2	Isaiah Gentry	Fr
QB	7	Mitch Leidner (C)	Jr
WR	9	Eric Carter	So
QB	11	Demry Croft	Fr
WR	12	Hunter Register	Fr
WR	14	Chris Streveler	So
WR	15	Desmond Gant	Fr
QB	15	Conor Rhoda	So
WR	16	Jeff Jones	Fr
QB	18	Jacques Perra	Fr
WR	19	Michael Conway	So
WR	20	Adam Mayer	Fr
WR	21	Melvin Holland	Sr
WR	22	Jeff Borchardt	So
WR	23	E.J. Sardinha	Jr
RB	24	Rodney Smith	Fr
RB	27	Shannon Brooks	Fr
RB	27	James Johannesson	Fr
RB	28	Jonathan Femi-Cole	Fr
RB	28	Jerry Gibson	Fr
WR	29	Louis Tuszynski	Jr
RB	32	Berkley Edwards	So
RB	35	Rodrick Williams	Sr
WR	37	Charlie Greif	Fr
FB	41	Miles Thomas	Sr
FB	43	Tyler Hartmann	Jr
TE	44	Gabe Mezzenga	Jr
RB	44	Jacob Kirsch	Jr
TE	44	Colton Beebe	Fr
TE	45	Nick Hart	So
TE	49	Bryce Witham	Fr
OL	53	Luke Rasmussen	Fr
OL	55	Connor Mayes	So
OL	58	Quinn Oseland	Fr
OL	60	Matt Leidner	So
OL	61	Bronson Dovich	Fr
OL	62	Jared Weyler	Fr
OL	63	Jon Christenson	Sr
OL	64	Matt Oldenkamp	Fr
OL	65	Josh Campion	Sr
OL	66	Ted Stieber	Fr
OL	67	Brian Bobek	Sr
OL	68	Issac Hayes	Jr
OL	70	Chad Fahning	So
OL	71	Tyler Moore	Fr
OL	73	Joe Bjorklund	Sr
OL	74	Nick Connelly	Fr
OL	75	Noah Kuehn	Fr
OL	76	Alex Mayes	So
OL	77	Foster Bush	Sr
OT	78	Ben Lauer	Jr
OT	79	Jonah Pirsig	Jr
TE	80	Nate Wozniak	So
TE	81	Duke Anyanwu	So
WR	82	Drew Wolitarsky	Jr
TE	83	Noah Scarver	So
WR	84	Will Reger	Fr
TE	85	Lincoln Plsek	Sr
TE	86	Brandon Lingen	So
WR	88	Rashad Still	Fr
WR	89	Matt Morse	Fr

Defense

Pos.	#	Name	Class
DB	2	Dior Johnson	Fr
DB	3	KiAnte Hardin	Fr
DB	4	Adekunle Ayinde	So
DB	5	Jalen Myrick	Jr
DB	6	Ace Rogers	Jr
DB	7	Damarius Travis	Sr
DB	8	Daletavious McGhee	So
DL	9	Alex Keith	Sr
DB	11	Antonio Johnson	Sr
LB	12	Cody Poock	So
LB	13	Jonathan Celestin	So
DB	14	Zo Craighton	Fr
LB	15	Everett Williams	So
DB	17	Jacob Huff	Fr
LB	18	Peter Westerhaus	Sr
LB	19	Cedric Dicke	Jr
DB	20	Julian Huff	Fr
DB	20	Christopher Gray	Fr
DB	22	Craig James	So
DB	25	Ray Buford	Fr
LB	26	De'Vondre Campbell	Sr
DB	29	Briean Boddy-Calhoun (C)	Sr
LB	30	Chris Wipson	So
DB	31	Eric Murray (C)	Sr
DB	33	John McKelvey	Jr
DB	34	Antonio Shenault	Fr
LB	35	Jaylen Waters	Fr
DB	36	Blake Cashman	Fr
DB	40	Alexander Starks	So
DL	46	Winston DeLattiboudere	Fr
LB	48	Blake Weber	So
LB	50	Jack Lynn	Jr
DL	52	Yoshoub Timms	Jr
DE	55	Thieren Cockran	Sr
LB	56	Nick Rallis	Jr
LB	57	Joey Mydra	Fr
LB	59	Ray Dixon	So
DL	69	Justin Carr	Jr
DB	87	Cavonte Johnson	Jr
DL	87	Gaelin Elmore	So
DL	90	Sam Renner	Fr
DE	91	Julien Kafo	Fr
DL	92	Robert Ndondo-Lay	Sr
DT	94	Mose Hall	Fr
DL	95	Hendrick Ekpe	Jr
DT	96	Steven Richardson	So
DL	97	Scott Ekpe	Jr
DL	98	Kevin Lapham	Fr
DE	99	Andrew Stelter	So

Special teams

Pos.	#	Name	Class
K	18	Ryan Santoso	So
LS	25	Payton Jordahl	Fr
K	33	Andrew Harte	So
P	34	Logan McElfresh	Fr
P	37	Peter Mortell	Sr
K	38	Emmit Carpenter	Fr
LS	39	Trey Hansen	Fr
LS	40	Chase Samuels	Fr
K	42	Justin Juenemann	So
P	47	Jacob Herbers	Fr

Head coach

- Jerry Kill (resigned)
- Tracy Claeys (defensive coordinator / interim head coach / head coach)

Coordinators/assistant coaches

- Brian Anderson (wide receivers)
- Matt Limegrover (offensive coordinator)
- Dan O'Brien (asst. defensive backs / co-special teams coordinator / asst. to the head coach)
- Jeff Phelps (defensive line)
- Pat Poore (running backs / co-special teams coordinator)
- Rob Reeves (H-backs / tight ends)
- Jay Sawvel (defensive backs)
- Mike Sherels (linebackers)
- Jim Zebrowski (quarterbacks)

Legend

- (C) Team captain
- (S) Suspended
- (I) Ineligible
- Injured
- Redshirt

Roster
Last update: December 31, 2015

== Players into the NFL ==
Round	Pick	Player	Position	NFL club
4	106	Eric Murray	CB	Kansas City Chiefs
4	115	De'Vondre Campbell	LB	Atlanta Falcons
Undrafted	–	Briean Boddy-Calhoun	CB	Jacksonville Jaguars
