= Minnesota Golden Gophers football annual team awards =

These are the Minnesota Golden Gophers annual team award recipients.

== Season awards ==
	Bronko Nagurski	Bruce Smith	Carl Eller	Bobby Bell	Butch Nash	Paul Giel	Neil Fredenburg	Practice Squad		Tony Dungy	Gary Tinsley	Trench Award		Bob McNamara	R.T.B.
Year	Team MVP	Outstanding Offense	Outstanding Defense	Outstanding Special Teams	Competitive on Classroom/Field	Unselfishness	Love of the Game	Offensive	Defensive	Character and Community Service	Embracing Underdog	Offensive	Defensive	Gopher Elite Award	Trust Award
1930	Clarence Munn														
1931	Clarence Munn														
1932	Roy Oen														
1933	Francis "Pug" Lund														
1934	Francis "Pug" Lund														
1935	Vernal "Babe" LeVoir														
1936	Ed Widseth														
1937	Rudy Gmitro														
1938	Larry Buhler														
1939	Harold Van Every														
1940	Bob Paffrath														
1941	Bob Sweiger														
1942	Dick Wildung														
1943	Paul Mitchell														
1944	John Lundquist														
1945	Bob Fitch														
1946	Billy Bye														
1947	Larry Olsonoski														
1948	Everette Faunce														
1949	Bud Grant														
1950	Wayne Robinson														
1951	Ron Engel														
1952	Paul Giel														
1953	Paul Giel														
1954	Bob McNamara														
1955	Don Swanson														
1956	Bobby Cox														
1957	Dick Larson														
1958	Everette Gerths														
1959	Tom Moe														
1960	Tom Brown														
1961	Sandy Stephens														
1962	Bobby Bell														
1963	Carl Eller														
1964	Joe Pung														
1965	John Hankinson														
1966	Tim Wheeler														
1967	Tom Sakal														
1968	Wayne King														
1969	Ray Parson														
1970	Jeff Wright														
1971	Tom Chandler														
1972	John King														
1973	Matt Herkenhoff; Steve Neils														
1974	Ollie Bakken														
1975	Tony Dungy														
1976	Tony Dungy														
1977	Steve Midboe														
1978	Marion Barber Jr.														
1979	Mark Carlson	Elmer Bailey	Keith Edwards												
1980	Marion Barber Jr.	Garry White	Jeff Schuh												
1981	Mike Hohensee	Chester Cooper	Randy Rasmussen												
1982	Mike Horensee	Jim Fahnhorst	Karl Mecklenburg												
1983	Randy Rasmussen	Jay Carroll	Peter Najarian												
1984	Rickey Foggie	Mark Vondehaar	Peter Najarian	Larry Joyner	John Kelly	Dwayne McMullen									
1985	Rickey Foggie	Ray Hitchcock	Peter Najarian	Chip Lohmiller	Andy Hare	David Puk									
1986	Darrell Thompson	Darrell Thompson	Mark Dusbabek	Chip Lohmiller	Anthony Burke	Norries Wilson									
1987	Rickey Foggie	Darrell Thompson	Jon Leverenz	Chip Lohmiller	Brian Bonner	Dan Rechtin									
1988	Chris Gaiters	Chris Gaiters	Joel Brown	Brent Herbel	Ross Ukkelberg	Pat Hart									
1989	Darrell Thompson	Darrell Thompson	Eddie Miles	Brent Berglund	Dan Liimatta	Jon Melander									
1990	Mike Sunvold	Marquel Fleetwood	Mike Sunvold	Kenneth Sebree	Frank Jackson	Jim King									
1991	Sean Lumpkin	Patt Evans	Sean Lumpkin	Ken McClintock	Joel Staats	Scott Schaffner									
1992	Keith Ballard	Antonio Carter	Dennis Cappella	Jon Lewis	Russ Heath	Ken McClintock									
1993	Omar Douglas	Omar Douglas	Andrew Veit	Scott Williams	Omar Douglas	Antonio Carter									
1994	Chris Darkins	Chris Darkins	Craig Sauer	Rishon Early	Justin Conzemius	Ed Hawthorne									
1995	Craig Sauer	Cory Sauter	Craig Sauer	Mike Chalberg	Justin Conzemius	Chris Darkins									
1996	Ryan Thelwell; Gann Brooks	Tutu Atwell	Parc Williams	Rishon Early	Cory Sauter	Jerome Davis									
1997	Lamanzer Williams	Tutu Atwell	Lamanzer Williams	Tutu Atwell	Parc Williams	Cory Sauter		Michael Mullen	Curtese Poole						
1998	Tyrone Carter	Luke Leverson	Tyrone Carter	Adam Bailey	Parc Williams	Troy Duerr		Scooter Baugus	Karon Riley						
1999	Tyrone Carter	Thomas Hamner	Tyrone Carter	Dan Nystrom	Ben Mezera	Ben Hamilton	Sean Hoffman	Ben Utecht	DaVonta Bell						
2000	Ben Hamilton; Ron Johnson	Ron Johnson	Karon Riley	Preston Gruening	Ben Hamilton	Justin Hall	Sean Hoffman	Clarence Woods	Darrell Reid						
2001	Ron Johnson	Ron Johnson; Tellis Redmon	Jack Brewer	Marion Barber III	Derek Burns	Jack Brewer	Steve Murray	Jerry Macken	Charlton Keith						
2002	Jermaine Mays	Terry Jackson II	Eli Ward	Jermaine Mays	Dan Kwapinski	Jeremiah Carter	Jeremiah Carter	Zack Kartak	Eric Clark; Pat McCarthy; Eric Washington						
2003	Asad Abdul-Khaliq	Asad Abdul-Khaliq	Eli Ward	Rhys Lloyd	Greg Eslinger	Joe Quinn	Dan Kwapinski	Kevin Salmen	John Shevlin						
2004	Marion Barber III; Laurence Maroney	Marion Barber III	Darrell Reid	John Shevlin	Mark Setterstrom	Dominique Sims	Jakari Wallace	Tommy Jacobs	Seth Thompson						
2005	Greg Eslinger; Laurence Maroney	Greg Eslinger	John Pawielski	Jakari Wallace	Greg Eslinger	Mark Setterstrom	Matt Spaeth	Joe Swanson	Brody Grandas						
2006	Matt Spaeth	Logan Payne	Mike Sherels	Tom Hennessey	Dominic Jones	Dom Barber	Mike Sherels	Matt Krueger	Mike Hart						
2007	Dom Barber	Eric Decker	Dom Barber	Justin Kucek; Nathan Triplett	John Shevlin; Steve Shidell	Todd Meisel; Tony Brinkhaus	Mike Sherels; Justin Valentine	Kyle Moore	Andre Tate’	Amir Pinnix					
2008	Willie VanDeSteeg	Adam Weber; Eric Decker	Lee Campbell; Garret Brown	Nathan Triplett	Jeff Tow-Arnett; Marcus Sherels	Tony Mortensen; Eric Small	Jack Simmons; Kyle Theret	Matt Carufel	Kim Royston	Deon Hightower					
2009	Eric Decker	Eric Decker	Lee Campbell	Jon Hoese	Jon Hoese; Garrett Brown	Adam Weber; Ryan Collado	Eric Small; Lee Campbell; Nick Tow-Arnett	Ed Olson	Aaron Hill	Eric Decker					
2010	Adam Weber	Da'Jon Mcknight; MarQueis Gray	Gary Tinsley	Troy Stoudermire	D.J. Burris; Ryan Collado	Duane Bennett	Jon Hoese; Anthony Jacobs	Lamonte Edwards	Cameron Botticelli	R.J. Buckner					
2011	MarQueis Gray	MarQueis Gray	Kim Royston	Jordan Wettstein	Aaron Hill	Adam Lueck	Duane Bennett	Cole Banham	Jephte Matilus	Brandon Kirksey					
2012	MarQueis Gray	Donnell Kirkwood	Michael Carter	Christian Eldred	Aaron Hill	MarQueis Gray	Mike Rallis	Cole Banham; Mitch Leidner	Matt Garin; Jack Lynn	Connor Cosgrove					
2013	Ra'Shede Hageman	David Cobb	Ra'Shede Hageman	Peter Mortell	Jon Christenson	Brock Vereen; Aaron Hill	Aaron Hill	Jephte Matilus	Chris Wipson	Chris Hawthorne	David Cobb				
2014	David Cobb	David Cobb	Damien Wilson	Peter Mortell	Jon Christenson	Donnell Kirkwood	Mitch Leidner	Matt Leidner	Cody Poock	Luke McAvoy	Briean Boddy-Calhoun				
2015	Mitch Leidner	Mitch Leidner	Eric Murray	Peter Mortell	Jon Christenson	Jon Christenson	Mitch Leidner	Conor Rhoda	Gary Moore; Winston DeLattiboudere	Jon Christenson	Adekunle Ayinde				
2016	Rodney Smith	Rodney Smith	Damarius Travis	Emmit Carpenter	Scott Ekpe	Mitch Leidner	Mitch Leidner; Jack Lynn; Nick Rallis	Seth Green	Gary Moore	Damarius Travis	Blake Cashman				
2017	Rodney Smith	Nate Wozniak	Jonathan Celestin	Ryan Santoso	Brandon Lingen; Andrew Stelter	Adekunle Ayinde; Eric Carter	Thomas Barber; Conor Rhoda	Mohamed Ibrahim	Esezi Otomewo; Jack Leius	Emmit Carpenter; Ryan Santoso	Blake Cashman; Kobe McCrary	Garrison Wright	Steven Richardson	Nate Wozniak	Payton Jordahl
2018	Tyler Johnson	Mohamed Ibrahim	Carter Coughlin	Payton Jordahl	Payton Jordahl; Gary Moore; Sam Renner	Emmit Carpenter	Thomas Barber	Brevyn Spann-Ford; Preston Jelen	Mayan Ahanotu	Seth Green	Jacob Huff	Jared Weyler	Carter Coughlin	Curtis Dunlap Jr.	Blaise Andries; Sam Renner
2019	Rashod Bateman	Tyler Johnson; Rodney Smith	Antoine Winfield Jr.	Jacob Herbers	Sam Renner	Mohamed Ibrahim	Tanner Morgan	Johnny Santaga	DeAngelo Carter	Winston DeLattiboudere; Seth Green	Kamal Martin	Sam Schlueter	Carter Coughlin	Sam Renner	John Michael Schmitz; Thomas Barber
