= 2015 Ohio State Buckeyes football team =

American college football season

2015 Ohio State Buckeyes football

Big Ten East Division co-champion Fiesta Bowl champion

Fiesta Bowl, W 44–28 vs. Notre Dame
- Conference: Big Ten Conference
- East Division

Ranking
- Coaches: No. 4
- AP: No. 4
- Record: 12–1 (7–1 Big Ten)
- Head coach: Urban Meyer (4th season)
- Offensive coordinator: Ed Warinner (4th season)
- Co-offensive coordinator: Tim Beck (1st season)
- Offensive scheme: Spread
- Defensive coordinator: Luke Fickell (10th season)
- Co-defensive coordinator: Chris Ash (2nd season)
- Base defense: Multiple
- Captains: J. T. Barrett; Jacoby Boren; Joshua Perry; Tyvis Powell
- Home stadium: Ohio Stadium

2015 Big Ten Conference football standings
	Conf.			Overall
Team	W		L	W		L
East Division
No. 6 Michigan State xy$^	7	–	1	12	–	2
No. 4 Ohio State x	7	–	1	12	–	1
No. 12 Michigan	6	–	2	10	–	3
Penn State	4	–	4	7	–	6
Indiana	2	–	6	6	–	7
Rutgers	1	–	7	4	–	8
Maryland	1	–	7	3	–	9
West Division
No. 9 Iowa xy	8	–	0	12	–	2
No. 23 Northwestern	6	–	2	10	–	3
No. 21 Wisconsin	6	–	2	10	–	3
Nebraska	3	–	5	6	–	7
Minnesota	2	–	6	6	–	7
Illinois	2	–	6	5	–	7
Purdue	1	–	7	2	–	10
Championship: Michigan State 16, Iowa 13
^ – College Football Playoff participant; $ – Conference champion; x – Division champion/co-champions; y – Championship game participant; Rankings from AP Poll

The 2015 Ohio State Buckeyes football team represented Ohio State University in the 2015 NCAA Division I FBS football season. It was the Buckeyes' 126th season overall, the 103rd as a member of the Big Ten Conference, and second as a member of the Eastern Division. The team was led by Urban Meyer, in his fourth year as head coach, and played its home games at Ohio Stadium in Columbus, Ohio. They finished the season 12–1, 7–1 in Big Ten play, to finish in a tie for the East Division championship with Michigan State. Due to their head-to-head loss to Michigan State, they did not represent the East Division in the Big Ten Championship Game. They were invited to the Fiesta Bowl where they defeated Notre Dame.

== Schedule ==
The Big Ten Conference released the schedule for the 2015 season on June 3, 2013. Ohio State would face all six Eastern Division opponents Indiana, Maryland, Michigan, Michigan State, Penn State and Rutgers. Ohio State would also face two Western Division opponents: rival Illinois and Minnesota. Ohio State played four non-conference games: Virginia Tech of the Atlantic Coast Conference, Hawaii of the Mountain West Conference, and Northern Illinois and Western Michigan of the Mid-American Conference. Ohio State had one bye week during the season between their games against Rutgers and Minnesota.

Date	Time	Opponent	Rank	Site	TV	Result	Attendance
September 7	8:00 p.m.	at Virginia Tech*	No. 1	Lane Stadium; Blacksburg, VA	ESPN	W 42–24	65,632
September 12	3:30 p.m.	Hawaii*	No. 1	Ohio Stadium; Columbus, OH	BTN	W 38–0	107,145
September 19	3:30 p.m.	Northern Illinois*	No. 1	Ohio Stadium; Columbus, OH	ABC/ESPN2	W 20–13	104,095
September 26	3:30 p.m.	Western Michigan*	No. 1	Ohio Stadium; Columbus, OH	ABC/ESPN2	W 38–12	106,123
October 3	3:30 p.m.	at Indiana	No. 1	Memorial Stadium; Bloomington, IN	ABC/ESPN2	W 34–27	52,929
October 10	12:00 p.m.	Maryland^{†}	No. 1	Ohio Stadium; Columbus, OH	BTN	W 49–28	107,869
October 17	8:00 p.m.	Penn State	No. 1	Ohio Stadium; Columbus, OH (rivalry)	ABC	W 38–10	108,423
October 24	8:00 p.m.	at Rutgers	No. 1	High Point Solutions Stadium; Piscataway, NJ	ABC	W 49–7	53,111
November 7	8:00 p.m.	Minnesota	No. 3	Ohio Stadium; Columbus, OH	ABC	W 28–14	108,075
November 14	12:00 p.m.	at Illinois	No. 3	Memorial Stadium; Champaign, IL (Illibuck Trophy)	ABC	W 28–3	51,515
November 21	3:30 p.m.	No. 9 Michigan State	No. 3	Ohio Stadium; Columbus, OH (College GameDay)	ABC	L 14–17	108,975‡
November 28	12:00 p.m.	at No. 10 Michigan	No. 8	Michigan Stadium; Ann Arbor, MI (The Game)	ABC	W 42–13	111,829
January 1, 2016	1:00 p.m.	vs. No. 8 Notre Dame*	No. 7	University of Phoenix Stadium; Glendale, AZ (Fiesta Bowl)	ESPN	W 44–28	71,123
*Non-conference game; ^{†}Homecoming; Rankings from AP Poll and CFP Rankings (after November 3) released prior to game; All times are in Eastern time

- ‡ New Ohio Stadium attendance record

== Personnel ==
Ohio State head coach Urban Meyer was his fourth year as the Buckeye's head coach during the 2015 season. In his previous three seasons with Ohio State, he led the Buckeyes to an overall record of 38 wins and 3 losses (38–3) and the 2014 national championship. On December 16, 2014, offensive coordinator Tom Herman accepted the head coaching position at Houston. On January 11, 2015, Ohio State announced the hiring of former Nebraska coach Tim Beck to replace Herman as co-offensive coordinator. On February 2, 2015, Stan Drayton accepted the running backs coach position with the Chicago Bears, and was replaced by former Notre Dame coach Tony Alford.

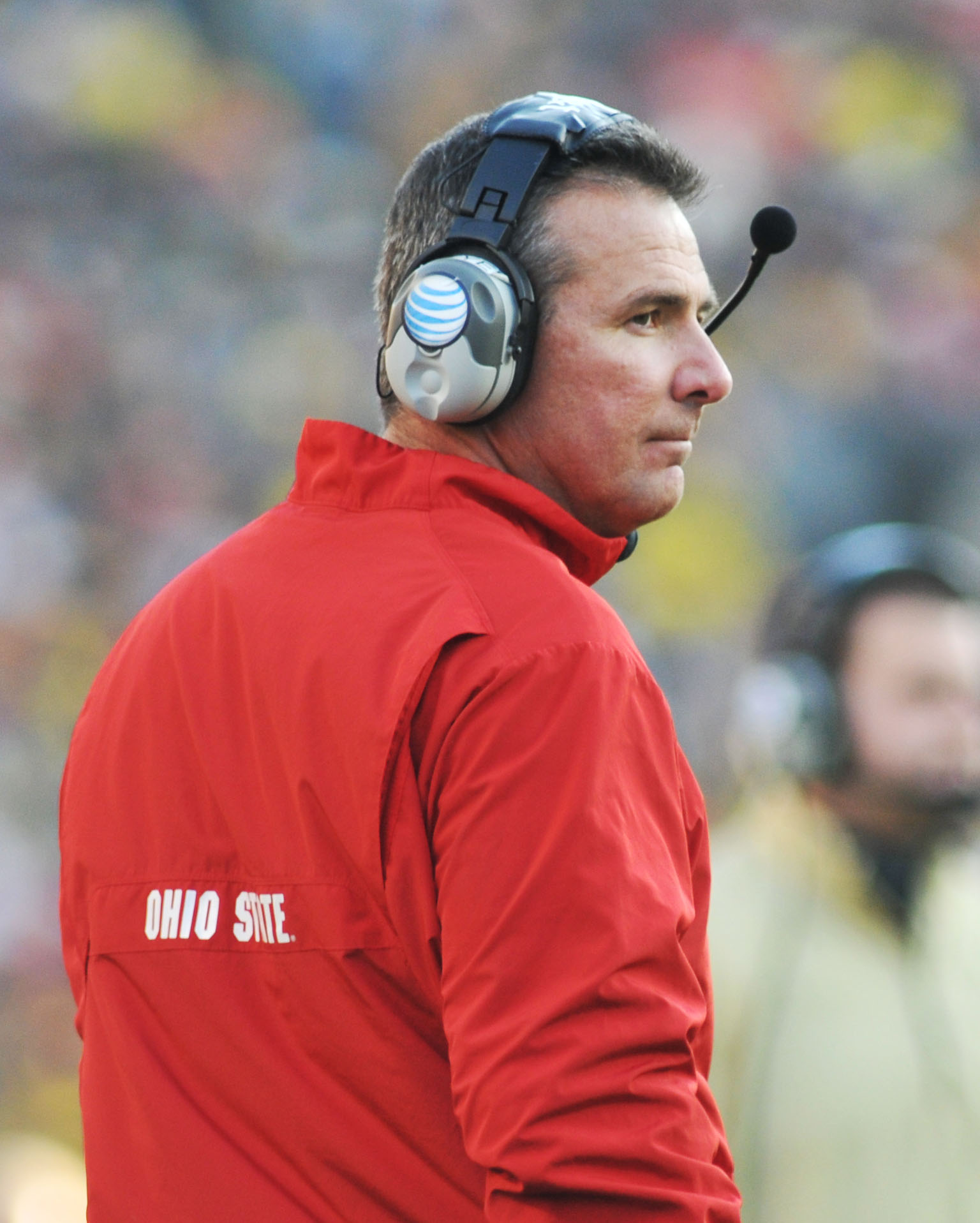
Head coach Urban Meyer

=== Coaching staff ===
Name	Position	Seasons at Ohio State	Alma mater
Urban Meyer	Head coach	4th	Cincinnati (1986)
Luke Fickell	Co-Defensive coordinator/linebackers	14th	Ohio State (1997)
Chris Ash	Co-defensive coordinator/safeties	2nd	Drake (1995)
Larry Johnson	Assistant head coach/defensive line	2nd	Elizabeth City State (1973)
Kerry Coombs	Special teams coordinator/cornerbacks	4th	Dayton (1983)
Tim Beck	Co-Offensive coordinator/quarterbacks	1st	Central Florida (1988)
Ed Warinner	Co-offensive coordinator/offensive line	4th	Mount Union (1984)
Tony Alford	Assistant head coach/running backs	1st	Colorado State (1992)
Zach Smith	Wide receivers	4th	Florida (2007)
Tim Hinton	Tight ends, fullbacks	4th	Wilmington (1982)
Quinn Tempel	Offensive graduate assistant	1st	Ohio State (2013)
Mickey Marotti	Assistant athletic director for football sports performance	4th	West Liberty (1987)

=== Roster ===
2015 Ohio State Buckeyes football team roster
Players
Coaches
Offense

Pos.	#	Name	Class
WR, QB	1	Braxton Miller	Sr
HB	2	Dontre Wilson	Jr
WR	3	Michael Thomas	Jr
RB	4	Curtis Samuel	So
WR	5	Johnnie Dixon	Fr
QB, WR	6	Torrance Gibson	Fr
WR	7	Jalin Marshall	So
QB	10	Joe Burrow	Fr
QB	11	Justin Cook	So
QB	12	Cardale Jones	Jr
QB	13	Stephen Collier	Fr
WR	14	K. J. Hill	Fr
RB	15	Ezekiel Elliott	Jr
QB	16	J. T. Barrett	So
WR	18	Kato Mitchell	Sr
WR	19	Joe Ramstetter	So
RB	20	Mike Weber	Fr
WR	21	Parris Campbell	Fr
WR	23	Devlin McDaniel	Jr
TE	24	Rashod Berry	Fr
RB	25	Bri'onte Dunn	Jr
RB	26	Patrick Wise	So
RB	28	Warren Ball	Jr
WR	33	Austin Clutter	Fr
RB	35	Jeffie Johnson	Sr
TE	44	Guy Ferrelli	Jr
C	50	Jacoby Boren	Sr
OL	51	Joel Hale	Sr
OL	54	Billy Price	So
OL	56	Matthew Burrell	Fr
OL	57	Chase Farris	Sr
OL	59	Isaiah Prince	Fr
OL	60	Blake Pfenning	Fr
OL	62	Aaron Parry	Jr
OL	63	Kevin Woidke	Fr
OL	65	Pat Elflein	Jr
OL	68	Taylor Decker	Sr
OL	69	Brandon Pahl	Fr
OL	71	Kyle Trout	Fr
OL	74	Jamarco Jones	So
OL	75	Evan Lisle	So
OL	76	Branden Bowen	Fr
OL	77	Kevin Feder	Fr
OL	78	Demetrius Knox	Fr
OL	79	Brady Taylor	Fr
WR	80	Noah Brown	So
TE	81	Nick Vannett	Sr
WR	82	James Clark	So
WR	83	Terry McLaurin	Fr
WR	84	Corey Smith	Sr
TE	85	Marcus Baugh	So
WR	87	Alex Stump	Fr
TE	88	A. J. Alexander	Fr
WR	89	Jeff Greene	Sr

Defense

Pos.	#	Name	Class
S	1	Erick Smith	So
CB	2	Marshon Lattimore	Fr
CB	3	Damon Webb	So
LB	5	Raekwon McMillan	So
DE	6	Sam Hubbard	Fr
CB	8	Gareon Conley	So
DL	9	Jashon Cornell	Fr
DL	10	Jalyn Holmes	So
S	11	Vonn Bell	Jr
CB	12	Denzel Ward	Fr
CB	13	Eli Apple	So
CB	14	Joshua Norwood	Fr
DB	15	Cameron Howard	Sr
S	16	Cam Burrows	Jr
LB	17	Jerome Baker	Fr
S	18	Michael Lawless	Jr
CB	19	Eric Glover-Williams	Fr
S	20	Khaleed Franklin	Jr
CB	21	Trevon Forte	So
S	23	Tyvis Powell	Jr
S	24	Malik Hooker	Fr
CB	25	Logan Kelleher	So
S	26	Jarrod Barnes	Jr
S	28	Michael Cibene	Jr
S	29	Mike Maduko	So
LB	30	Jared Drake	Fr
CB	32	Elijaah Goins	Jr
LB	33	Dante Booker	So
LB	34	Nick Conner	Fr
LB	35	Chris Worley	So
LB	36	Zach Turnure	Jr
LB	37	Joshua Perry	Sr
LB	38	Craig Fada	Jr
LB	39	Kyle Berger	Fr
LB	43	Darron Lee	So
S	46	Cin'Quan Haney	Jr
LB	47	Justin Hilliard	Fr
LB	48	Joe Burger	Jr
DL	52	Donovan Munger	So
DT	53	DaVon Hamilton	Fr
LB	55	Cam Willams	Sr
DT	57	Robert Landers	Fr
DL	59	Tyquan Lewis	So
DE	70	Chris Fong	Sr
DL	77	Michael Hill	So
DL	86	Dre'Mont Jones	Fr
DL	90	Tommy Schutt	Sr
DL	92	Adolphus Washington	Sr
DL	93	Tracy Sprinkle	So
DL	94	Dylan Thompson	Fr
DL	97	Joey Bosa	Jr

Special teams

Pos.	#	Name	Class
K	30	Tyler Durbin	Jr
LS	41	Bryce Haynes	Sr
LS	44	Aaron Mawhirter	Jr
LS	49	Liam McCullough	Fr
P	95	Cameron Johnston	Jr
K	96	Sean Nuernberger	So
K	98	Jack Willoughby	Sr

Head coach

- Urban Meyer

Coordinators/assistant coaches

- Ed Warinner (Offensive coordinator / offensive line)
- Tim Beck (Co-offensive coordinator / quarterbacks)
- Tony Alford (Assistant head coach / running backs)
- Tim Hinton (Tight ends / Fullbacks)
- Zack Smith (Wide receivers)
- Luke Fickell (Co-defensive coordinator / linebackers)
- Chris Ash (Co-defensive coordinator / safeties)
- Larry Johnson (Assistant head coach / defensive line)
- Kerry Coombs (Special teams coordinator / cornerbacks)
- Mickey Marotti (Assistant athletic director for football sports performance)
- Vince Okruch (Quality control coach – kicking game / defense)
- Matt Thurin (Quality control coach – Defense)
- Bill Busch (Quality control coach – Defense)
- Jim Cordle (Graduate assistant – offense)
- Brian Mason (Graduate assistant – defense)
- Matt Merritt (Graduate assistant – offense)
- Vince Oghobaase (Graduate assistant – defense)

Legend

- (C) Team captain
- (S) Suspended
- (I) Ineligible
- Injured
- Redshirt

Roster
Last update: January 5, 2016

=== Depth chart ===
Defense

FS
11 Vonn Bell
1 Erick Smith

WLB	MLB	SLB
37 Joshua Perry	5 Raekwon McMillan	43 Darron Lee
33 Dante Booker	55 Cam Williams	35 Chris Worley

SS
23 Tyvis Powell
24 Malik Hooker

CB
13 Eli Apple
3 Damon Webb

DE	DT	DT	DE
97 Joey Bosa	92 Adolphus Washington	90 Tommy Schutt	59 Tyquan Lewis
6 Sam Hubbard	77 Michael Hill	51 Joel Hale	10 Jalyn Holmes

CB
19 Gareon Conley
2 Marshon Lattimore

Offense

WR
3 Michael Thomas
84 Corey Smith

H-Back
1 Braxton Miller
4 Curtis Samuel

LT	LG	C	RG	RT
68 Taylor Decker	54 Billy Price	50 Jacoby Boren	65 Pat Elflein	57 Chase Farris
74 Jamarco Jones	78 Demetris Knox	79 Brady Taylor	75 Evan Lisle	59 Isaiah Prince

TE
81 Nick Vannett
85 Marcus Baugh

WR
17 Jalin Marshall
2 Dontre Wilson

QB
16 J. T. Barrett
12 Cardale Jones

Special teams

RB
15 Ezekiel Elliott
4 Bri'onten Dunn

== Rankings ==
Ranking movements Legend: ██ Increase in ranking ██ Decrease in ranking ( ) = First-place votes
	Week															
Poll	Pre	1	2	3	4	5	6	7	8	9	10	11	12	13	14	Final
AP	1 (61)	1 (61)	1 (61)	1 (59)	1 (42)	1 (45)	1 (38)	1 (27)	1 (28)	1 (39)	2 (26)	3 (23)	8	6	7	4
Coaches	1 (62)	1 (62)	1 (63)	1 (62)	1 (61)	1 (61)	1 (50)	1 (47)	1 (48)	1 (49)	1 (34)	2 (32)	8	6	5	4
CFP	Not released									3	3	3	8	6	7	Not released

== Game summaries ==
=== Virginia Tech ===
Team	1	2	3	4	Total
• #1 Ohio State	14	0	14	14	42
Virginia Tech	0	17	0	7	24

- Location: Blacksburg, Virginia
- Game start: 8:00 p.m.
- Elapsed time: 3:30
- Game attendance: 65,632
- TV announcers (ESPN): Chris Fowler and Kirk Herbstreit

Scoring summary
1	9:44	Ohio State	Curtis Samuel 24 yd pass from Cardale Jones (Jack Willoughby kick)	Ohio State 7–0
1	6:39	Ohio State	Ezekiel Elliott 80 yd run (Jack Willoughby kick)	Ohio State 14–0
2	13:13	Virginia Tech	Sam Rogers 51 yd pass from Michael Brewer (Joey Slye kick)	Ohio State 14–7
2	7:05	Virginia Tech	Joey Slye 46 yd field goal	Ohio State 14–10
2	0:16	Virginia Tech	Ryan Malleck 1 yd pass from Michael Brewer (Joey Slye kick)	Virginia Tech 17–14
3	13:53	Ohio State	Braxton Miller 54 yd pass from Cardale Jones (Jack Willoughby kick)	Ohio State 21–17
3	2:05	Ohio State	Braxton Miller 53 yd run (Jack Willoughby kick)	Ohio State 28–17
4	12:26	Ohio State	Cardale Jones 10 yd run (Jack Willoughby kick)	Ohio State 35–17
4	8:14	Ohio State	Michael Thomas 26 yd pass from J.T. Barrett (Jack Willoughby kick)	Ohio State 42–17
4	1:55	Virginia Tech	Isaiah Ford 9 yd pass from Brenden Motley (Joey Slye kick)	Ohio State 42–24

=== Hawaii ===
Team	1	2	3	4	Total
Hawaii	0	0	0	0	0
• #1 Ohio State	7	7	3	21	38

- Location: Columbus, Ohio
- Game start: 3:30 p.m.
- Elapsed time: 3:28
- Game attendance: 107,145
- Game weather: Sunny
- TV announcers (BTN): Kevin Kugler, Matt Millen, and Lisa Byington

Scoring summary
1	3:25	Ohio State	Ezekiel Elliott 1 yd run (Jack Willoughby kick)	Ohio State 7–0
2	4:03	Ohio State	Ezekiel Elliott 3 yd run (Jack Willoughby kick)	Ohio State 14–0
3	8:34	Ohio State	Jack Willoughby 20 yd field goal	Ohio State 17–0
4	9:07	Ohio State	Ezekiel Elliott 1 yd run (Jack Willoughby kick)	Ohio State 24–0
4	7:48	Ohio State	Vonn Bell 14 yd fumble return (Jack Willoughby kick)	Ohio State 31–0
4	3:51	Ohio State	Bri'onte Dunn 5 yd run (Jack Willoughby kick)	Ohio State 38–0

=== Northern Illinois ===
Team	1	2	3	4	Total
Northern Illinois	7	3	0	3	13
• #1 Ohio State	3	7	10	0	20

- Location: Columbus, Ohio
- Game start: 3:30 p.m.
- Elapsed time: 3:28
- Game attendance: 104,095
- Game weather: Cloudy, Light Rain
- TV announcers (ABC/ESPN2): Mike Patrick and Ed Cunningham

Scoring summary
1	12:43	Northern Illinois	Aregeros Turner 5 yd run (Christian Hagan kick)	Northern Illinois 7–0
1	6:21	Ohio State	Jack Willoughby 31 yd field goal	Northern Illinois 7–3
2	12:20	Northern Illinois	Christian Hagan 38 yd field goal	Northern Illinois 10–3
2	8:21	Ohio State	Michael Thomas 23 yd pass from J.T. Barrett (Jack Willoughby kick)	10–10
3	8:27	Ohio State	Jack Willoughby 24 yd field goal	Ohio State 13–10
3	1:44	Ohio State	Darren Lee 41 yd interception return (Jack Willoughby kick)	Ohio State 20–10
4	7:46	Northern Illinois	Christian Hagan 31 yd field goal	Ohio State 20–13

=== Western Michigan ===
Team	1	2	3	4	Total
Western Michigan	0	6	6	0	12
• #1 Ohio State	7	17	7	7	38

- Location: Columbus, Ohio
- Game start: 3:30 p.m.
- Elapsed time: 3:25
- Game attendance: 106,123
- Game weather: Cloudy
- TV announcers (ABC/ESPN2): Adam Amin and Kelly Stouffer

Scoring summary
1	13:26	Ohio State	Michael Thomas 38 yd pass from Cardale Jones (Jack Willoughby kick)	Ohio State 7–0
2	10:35	Ohio State	Jalin Marshall 37 yd pass from Cardale Jones (Jack Willoughby kick)	Ohio State 14–0
2	8:19	Western Michigan	Daniel Braverman 55 yd pass from Zach Terrell (PAT missed)	Ohio State 14–6
2	4:09	Ohio State	Jack Willoughby 30 yd field goal	Ohio State 17–6
2	4:02	Ohio State	Adolphus Washington 20 yd interception return (Jack Willoughby kick)	Ohio State 24–6
3	10:50	Ohio State	Ezekiel Elliott 6 yd run (Jack Willoughby kick)	Ohio State 31–6
3	4:26	Western Michigan	Jeremiah Mullinax 1 yd pass from Zach Terrell (2 pt conversion failed)	Ohio State 31–12
4	8:24	Ohio State	Curtis Samuel 40 yd run (Jack Willoughby kick)	Ohio State 38–12

=== Indiana ===
Team	1	2	3	4	Total
• #1 Ohio State	0	6	14	14	34
Indiana	3	7	7	10	27

- Location: Bloomington, Indiana
- Game start: 3:30 p.m.
- Elapsed time: 4:10
- Game attendance: 52,929
- Game weather: Cloudy, Light Rain
- TV announcers (ABC/ESPN2): Mike Patrick and Ed Cunningham

Scoring summary
1	7:26	Indiana	Griffin Oakes 34 yd field goal	Indiana 3–0
2	13:38	Indiana	Devine Redding 1 yd run (Griffin Oakes kick)	Indiana 10–0
2	10:21	Ohio State	Jack Willoughby 23 yd field goal	Indiana 10–3
2	6:50	Ohio State	Jack Willoughby 26 yd field goal	Indiana 10–6
3	8:57	Ohio State	Ezekiel Elliott 55 yd run (Jack Willoughby kick)	Ohio State 13–10
3	2:23	Indiana	Devine Redding 1 yd run (Griffin Oakes kick)	Indiana 17–13
3	1:02	Ohio State	Ezekiel Elliott 65 yd run (Jack Willoughby kick)	Ohio State 20–17
4	14:54	Ohio State	Michael Thomas 23 yd pass from Cardale Jones (Jack Willoughby kick)	Ohio State 27–17
4	10:37	Indiana	Griffin Oakes 34 yd field goal	Ohio State 27–20
4	10:24	Ohio State	Ezekiel Elliott 75 yd run (Jack Wiloughby kick)	Ohio State 34–20
4	10:03	Indiana	Zander Diamont 79 yd run (Griffin Oakes kick)	Ohio State 34–27

=== Maryland ===
Team	1	2	3	4	Total
Maryland	7	7	7	7	28
• #1 Ohio State	7	14	14	14	49

- Location: Columbus, Ohio
- Game start: 12:00 p.m.
- Elapsed time: 3:30
- Game attendance: 107,869
- Game weather: Sunny
- TV announcers (BTN): Eric Collins, Glen Mason

Scoring summary
1	10:52	Maryland	D.J. Moore 52 yd pass from Perry Hills (Brad Craddock kick)	Maryland 7–0
1	4:23	Ohio State	J.T. Barrett 3 yd run (Jack Willoughby kick)	7–7
2	14:32	Ohio State	Ezekiel Elliott 2 yd run (Jack Willoughby kick)	Ohio State 14–7
2	6:41	Ohio State	Braxton Miller 19 yd pass from Cardale Jones (Jack Willoughby kick)	Ohio State 21–7
2	0:43	Maryland	Perry Hills 3 yd run (Brad Craddock kick)	Ohio State 21–14
3	11:17	Maryland	Perry Hills 4 yd run (Brad Craddock kick)	21–21
3	6:58	Ohio State	Jalin Marshall 48 yd pass from Cardale Jones (Jack Willoughby kick)	Ohio State 28–21
3	0:15	Ohio State	J.T. Barrett 1 yd run (Jack Willoughby kick)	Ohio State 35–21
4	6:38	Ohio State	Ezekiel Elliott 16 yd run (Jack Willoughby kick)	Ohio State 42–21
4	5:46	Ohio State	J.T. Barrett 18 yd run (Jack Willoughby kick)	Ohio State 49–21
4	0:55	Maryland	Wes Brown 1 yd run (Brad Craddock kick)	Ohio State 49–28

=== Penn State ===
Team	1	2	3	4	Total
Penn State	3	0	7	0	10
• #1 Ohio State	0	21	0	17	38

- Location: Columbus, Ohio
- Game start: 8:00 p.m.
- Elapsed time: 3:45
- Game attendance: 108,423
- Game weather: Partly Cloudy
- TV announcers (ABC): Chris Fowler, Kirk Herbstreit, Heather Cox

Scoring summary
1	11:32	Penn State	Joey Julius 33 yd field goal	Penn State 3–0
2	13:43	Ohio State	J.T. Barrett 5 yd run (Jack Willoughby kick)	Ohio State 7–3
2	9:26	Ohio State	Ezekiel Elliott 10 yd run (Jack Willoughby kick)	Ohio State 14–3
2	3:17	Ohio State	J.T. Barrett 13 yd run (Jack Willoughby kick)	Ohio State 21–3
3	13:59	Penn State	DaeSean Hamilton 8 yd pass from Christian Hackenberg (Joey Julius kick)	Ohio State 21–10
4	12:54	Ohio State	Jack Willoughby 39 yd field goal	Ohio State 24–10
4	6:25	Ohio State	Braxton Miller 5 yd pass from J.T. Barrett (Jack Willoughby kick)	Ohio State 31–10
4	4:14	Ohio State	Michael Thomas 6 yd pass from J.T. Barrett (Jack Willoughby kick)	Ohio State 38–10

"Dark Night at the Shoe" – Ohio State wears all-black uniforms for the first time in school history.

=== Rutgers ===
Team	1	2	3	4	Total
• #1 Ohio State	7	14	21	7	49
Rutgers	0	0	0	7	7

- Location: Piscataway, New Jersey
- Game start: 8:00 p.m.
- Elapsed time: 3:30
- Game attendance: 53,111
- Game weather: Clear
- TV announcers (ABC): Chris Fowler, Kirk Herbstreit, Heather Cox

Scoring summary
1	0:10	Ohio State	Ezekiel Elliott 2 yd run (Jack Willoughby kick)	Ohio State 7–0
2	6:48	Ohio State	Michael Thomas 50 yd pass from J.T. Barrett (Jack Willoughby kick)	Ohio State 14–0
2	3:02	Ohio State	J.T. Barrett 2 yd run (Jack Willoughby kick)	Ohio State 21–0
3	13:13	Ohio State	Curtis Samuel 30 yd pass from J.T. Barrett (Jack Willoughby kick)	Ohio State 28–0
3	8:24	Ohio State	J.T. Barrett 10 yd run (Jack Willoughby kick)	Ohio State 35–0
3	4:34	Ohio State	Jalin Marshall 1 yd pass from J.T. Barrett	Ohio State 42–0
4	13:42	Ohio State	Ezekiel Elliott 55 yd run (Jack Willoughby kick)	Ohio State 49–0
4	0:13	Rutgers	Andre Patton 4 yd pass from Hayden Rettig (Kyle Federico kick)	Ohio State 49–7

=== Minnesota ===
Team	1	2	3	4	Total
Minnesota	0	0	0	14	14
• #1 Ohio State	0	14	7	7	28

- Location: Columbus, Ohio
- Game start: 8:00 p.m.
- Elapsed time: 3:35
- Game weather: Clear
- TV announcers (ABC): Brad Nessler, Todd Blackledge, Holly Rowe

Scoring summary
2	4:53	Ohio State	Vonn Bell 16 yd interception return (Jack Willoughby kick)	Ohio State 7–0
2	0:54	Ohio State	Ezekiel Elliott 15 yd run (Jack Willoughby kick)	Ohio State 14–0
3	6:43	Ohio State	Michael Thomas 6 yd pass from Cardale Jones (Jack Willoughby kick)	Ohio State 21–0
4	10:25	Minnesota	KJ Maye 4 yd pass from Mitch Leidner (Ryan Santoso kick)	Ohio State 21–7
4	2:10	Minnesota	Rashad Still 10 yd pass from Mitch Leidner (Ryan Santoso kick)	Ohio State 21–14
4	1:53	Ohio State	Cardale Jones 38 yd run (Jack Willoughby kick)	Ohio State 28–14

=== Illinois ===
Illibuck

Team	1	2	3	4	Total
• #2 Ohio State	7	7	7	7	28
Illinois	0	3	0	0	3

- Location: Champaign, Illinois
- Game start: 12:00 p.m.
- Elapsed time: 3:35
- Game attendance: 51,515
- Game weather: Sunny
- TV announcers (ABC): Sean McDonough, Chris Spielman, Todd McShay

Scoring summary
1	3:43	Ohio State	Michael Thomas 24 yd pass from J.T. Barrett (Sean Nuernberger kick)	Ohio State 7–0
2	10:12	Illinois	Taylor Zalewski 46 yd field goal	Ohio State 7–3
2	0:50	Ohio State	J.T. Barrett 6 yd run (Sean Nuernberger kick)	Ohio State 14–3
3	6:57	Ohio State	Ezekiel Elliott 1 yd run (Sean Nuernberger kick)	Ohio State 21–3
4	9:47	Ohio State	Ezekiel Elliott 10 yd run (Sean Nuernberger kick)	Ohio State 28–3

=== Michigan State ===
Team	1	2	3	4	Total
• #9 Michigan State	0	7	0	10	17
#2 Ohio State	0	7	7	0	14

- Location: Columbus, Ohio
- Game start: 3:30 p.m.
- TV announcers (ABC): Chris Fowler, Kirk Herbstreit, and Heather Cox

=== Michigan ===
The Game

Team	1	2	3	4	Total
• #8 Ohio State	7	7	14	14	42
#12 Michigan	0	10	0	3	13

- Location: Ann Arbor, Michigan
- Game start: 12:00 p.m.
- Game attendance: 111,829
- Game weather: Mostly cloudy
- Referee: Jerry McGinn
- TV announcers (ABC): Brad Nessler, Todd Blackledge, and Holly Rowe

=== Notre Dame–Fiesta Bowl ===
BattleFrog Fiesta Bowl

Team	1	2	3	4	Total
#8 Notre Dame	0	14	7	7	28
• #7 Ohio State	14	14	7	9	44

- Location: Glendale, AZ
- Game start: 1:07 p.m. EST
- Elapsed time: 3:31
- Game attendance: 71,123
- Game weather: None (Indoor Stadium)
- Referee: Hubert Owens (SEC)
- TV announcers (ESPN): Sean McDonough, Chris Spielman, & Todd McShay (ESPN) Adam Amin, Kelly Stouffer, & Olivia Harlan (ESPN Radio)

== 2016 NFL draft ==
The Buckeyes had 12 players (5 in the first round) in the 2016 NFL draft.

Round	Pick Number	NFL team	Player	Position
1	3	San Diego Chargers	Joey Bosa	DE
1	4	Dallas Cowboys	Ezekiel Elliott	RB
1	10	New York Giants	Eli Apple	CB
1	16	Detroit Lions	Taylor Decker	OT
1	20	New York Jets	Darron Lee	OLB
2	47	New Orleans Saints	Michael Thomas	WR
2	61	New Orleans Saints	Vonn Bell	S
3	80	Buffalo Bills	Adolphus Washington	DT
3	85	Houston Texans	Braxton Miller	WR
3	94	Seattle Seahawks	Nick Vannett	TE
4	102	San Diego Chargers	Joshua Perry	OLB
4	139	Buffalo Bills	Cardale Jones	QB

In addition, 3 players were signed as undrafted free agents

Position	Player	NFL team
OL	Chase Farris	Detroit Lions
WR	Jalin Marshall	New York Jets
S	Tyvis Powell	Seattle Seahawks
