= 2015 Quick Lane Bowl =

- 2nd Quick Lane Bowl
| Central Michigan Chippewas | Minnesota Golden Gophers |
| (7–5) | (5–7) |
| MAC | Big Ten |
| 14 | 21 |
| Head coach: John Bonamego | Head coach: Tracy Claeys (interim) |
| | 1 | 2 | 3 | 4 | Total |
|---|---|---|---|---|---|
| Central Michigan | 0 | 7 | 0 | 7 | 14 |
| Minnesota | 3 | 7 | 3 | 8 | 21 |
- Date: December 28, 2015
- Season: 2015
- Stadium: Ford Field
- Location: Detroit, Michigan
- MVP: Minnesota QB Mitch Leidner
- Favorite: Minnesota by 5½
- Referee: Dan Romeo (Big XII)
- Attendance: 34,217

United States TV coverage
- Network: ESPN2; Quick Lane Radio
- Announcers: Dave Neal, Matt Stinchcomb, & Kayce Smith (ESPN2); Don Chiodo, Brock Gutierrez, & Jim Costa (Quick Lane Radio)

The 2015 Quick Lane Bowl was a post-season college football bowl game between Central Michigan of the Mid-American Conference (MAC) and Minnesota of the Big Ten Conference played on December 28, 2015, at Ford Field in Detroit, Michigan. It was the second edition of the Quick Lane Bowl. The game began at 5:00 p.m. EST and aired on ESPN2.

== Teams ==
Although Minnesota finished with a below .500 record, they were allowed to participate in a bowl game after only 77 teams qualified for 80 available bowl spots. Minnesota was selected as one of three 5–7 teams to fill the final bowl spots due to their Academic Progress Rate (APR) scores.

== Game summary ==
=== Scoring summary ===
Scoring summary

| Quarter | Time | Drive | | | Team | Scoring information | Score | |
| Quarter | Time | Plays | Yards | TOP | Team | Scoring information | CMU | MINN |
|---|---|---|---|---|---|---|---|---|
| 1 | 10:11 | 9 | 70 | 4:49 | MINN | 22-yard field goal by Ryan Santoso | 0 | 3 |
| 2 | 14:55 | 15 | 82 | 6:29 | CMU | Cooper Rush 1-yard touchdown run, Brian Eavey kick good | 7 | 3 |
| 2 | 12:43 | 6 | 75 | 2:12 | MINN | K. J. Maye 11-yard touchdown reception from Mitch Leidner, Ryan Santoso kick good | 7 | 10 |
| 3 | 8:30 | 9 | 64 | 4:58 | MINN | 42-yard field goal by Ryan Santoso | 7 | 13 |
| 4 | 11:08 | 4 | 56 | 1:50 | CMU | Romello Ross 13-yard touchdown run, Brian Eavey kick good | 14 | 13 |
| 4 | 4:26 | 13 | 74 | 6:36 | MINN | Mitch Leidner 13-yard touchdown run, 2-point pass from Mitch Leidner to K. J. Maye good | 14 | 21 |
| "TOP" = time of possession. For other American football terms, see Glossary of American football. | | | | | | | 14 | 21 |

=== Statistics ===
| Statistics | CMU | MINN |
|---|---|---|
| First downs | 17 | 21 |
| Total offense, plays – yards | 58–249 | 69–381 |
| Rushes-yards (net) | 28–104 | 39–158 |
| Passing yards (net) | 145 | 223 |
| Passes, Comp-Att-Int | 15–30–1 | 24–30–1 |
| Time of Possession | 24:31 | 35:29 |
