= Max Shortell =

American football player (born 1992)

Profile
- Position: Quarterback

Personal information
- Born: August 22, 1992 (age 34); Kansas City, Missouri, U.S.
- Listed height: 6 ft 6 in (1.98 m)
- Listed weight: 241 lb (109 kg)

Career information
- High school: Bishop Miege (Roeland Park, Kansas)
- College: Minnesota (2011–2012); Jacksonville State (2013–2014)
- NFL draft: 2015: undrafted

Career history
- Birmingham Iron (2019)*
- * Offseason or practice squad member only

Max Garrett Shortell (born August 22, 1992) is an American football quarterback. He played college football for Jacksonville State Gamecocks. Shortell transferred to Jacksonville State after spending two seasons playing for the Minnesota Golden Gophers.

== Early life ==
Shortell went to Bishop Miege High School in Roeland Park, Kansas. A three-sport athlete, participating in football, basketball and baseball for two years, he dropped basketball and baseball his junior year to focus on football. For football, he was coached by former NFL Pro Bowler Tim Grunhard, and led his squad to 6–4 record, while completing 147-of-277 passes (53.1 percent), for 2,643 yards, 21 touchdowns and just seven interceptions in 2010 as a senior. As a junior, he led the Stags to a 12–2 mark and a 2009 Kansas Class 4A State Championship. He completed 144-of-250 passes (57.6 percent) for 2,524 yards, 29 touchdowns and 11 interceptions that season. He was a two-time Honorable Mention All-Eastern Kansas League selection.

College recruiting
Name	Hometown	School	Height	Weight	40^{‡}	Commit date
Max Shortell; QB	Mission, Kansas	Bishop Miege High School	6 ft 6 in (1.98 m)	214 lb (97 kg)	4.82	Jan 5, 2008
Max Shortell; QB	Recruit ratings: Scout: Rivals: (74)					
Overall recruit ranking: Scout: 58 (QB) Rivals: 22 (QB), 5 (KS) ESPN: 73 (QB), 281 (Midlands Region)
Note: In many cases, Scout, Rivals, 247Sports, On3, and ESPN may conflict in their listings of height and weight.; In these cases, the average was taken. ESPN grades are on a 100-point scale.; Sources: "Minnesota Football Commitment List (26)". Rivals.; "Minnesota College Football Recruiting Commits". Scout.; "ESPN". ESPN.; "Scout.com Team Recruiting Rankings". Scout.; "2011 Team Ranking". Rivals.com.

Shortell committed to the University of Minnesota on June 11, 2010. Shortell wasn't heavily recruited by Football Bowl Subdivision schools, as Minnesota was his only football scholarship offer.

== College career ==
=== Minnesota ===
==== 2011 season ====
During the 2011 pre-season, Shortell was in competition with MarQueis Gray for the starting quarterback job. To start the 2011 season, Shortell was named the backup quarterback to MarQueis Gray. In the opening game against USC, Gray left the game with cramps, making way for Shortell to get on the field. Shortell would lead a rally for the Gophers, but they came up short, as he threw an interception to end their drive and the game. For the game he completed 7 of 13 passes for 98 yard to go along with a touchdown and interception. In the Gophers' second game against New Mexico State, he saw limited action, as he came in relief of Gray, as Gray once again had cramps from the heat. For the game he completed 2 of 7 passes for 27 yards. He got his first career start against Michigan on October 2, 2011, due to Gray not being able to play with a toe injury. The Golden Gophers would lose the game 58–0, with Shortell completing 11 of 22 for 104 yards. He made his second career start the following week against Purdue, where he completed 2 passes for 9 yards, only seeing 2 series as the quarterback, before being pulled in favor of Gray.

==== 2012 season ====
Gray was once again named the starting quarterback for the Golden Gophers for the 2012 season. Shortell was listed as the backup following spring camp, and served that role for the first three games of the season. During the week 3 game against Western Michigan, Gray left the game with an injury, and Shortell led the Gophers back from an early deficit to defeat the Broncos throwing three touchdowns. Shortell would start the next three weeks, leading the Gophers to a 1–2 record during that time. A surprise came during the Gopher's week 7 game at Wisconsin, when true freshman, Philip Nelson was named the starting quarterback. Gray moved to wide receiver, and Nelson started every game for the rest of the season. Shortell was limited to the backup role for the rest of the season. Following the end of the Minnesota semester, Shortell announced his intentions to transfer.

=== Jacksonville State ===
==== 2013 season ====
On May 9, 2013, Shortell announced via Twitter, that he was transferring to Jacksonville State.

=== Statistics ===
Through the end of the 2012 season, Shortell's statistics are as follows:

		Passing								Rushing
Season	Team	GP	Rating	Att	Comp	Pct	Yds	TD	INT	Att	Yds	TD
2011	Minnesota	6	101.0	54	26	48.1	309	2	2	11	14	0
2012	Minnesota	7	126.3	116	65	56.0	853	6	5	34	48	0
	Totals	13	–	170	91	53.5	1,162	8	7	45	62	0

Shortell has a 1–3 win–loss ratio for his career as the starting quarterback at Minnesota.

== Professional career ==
In 2018, Shortell signed for the Birmingham Iron of the Alliance of American Football (AAF). However, he was not selected in the 2019 AAF QB Draft.
