= 2011 Minnesota Golden Gophers football team =

American college football season

2011 Minnesota Golden Gophers football
- Conference: Big Ten Conference
- Legends Division
- Record: 3–9 (2–6 Big Ten)
- Head coach: Jerry Kill (1st season)
- Offensive coordinator: Matt Limegrover (1st season)
- Offensive scheme: Spread
- Defensive coordinator: Tracy Claeys (1st season)
- Base defense: 4–3
- Captain: Game captains
- Home stadium: TCF Bank Stadium

2011 Big Ten Conference football standings
| | Conf. | | | Overall |
| Team | W | | L | W | | L |
|---|---|---|---|---|---|---|
Legends Division
| No. 11 Michigan State x | 7 | – | 1 | 11 | – | 3 |
| No. 12 Michigan % | 6 | – | 2 | 11 | – | 2 |
| No. 24 Nebraska | 5 | – | 3 | 9 | – | 4 |
| Iowa | 4 | – | 4 | 7 | – | 6 |
| Northwestern | 3 | – | 5 | 6 | – | 7 |
| Minnesota | 2 | – | 6 | 3 | – | 9 |
Leaders Division
| No. 10 Wisconsin xy$ | 6 | – | 2 | 11 | – | 3 |
| Penn State x | 6 | – | 2 | 9 | – | 4 |
| Purdue | 4 | – | 4 | 7 | – | 6 |
| Ohio State | 3 | – | 5 | 6 | – | 7 |
| Illinois | 2 | – | 6 | 7 | – | 6 |
| Indiana | 0 | – | 8 | 1 | – | 11 |
Championship: Wisconsin 42, Michigan State 39
$ – BCS representative as conference champion; % – BCS at-large representative; x – Division champion/co-champions; y – Championship game participant; Rankings from AP Poll

The 2011 Minnesota Golden Gophers football team represented the University of Minnesota for the 2011 college football season. The Golden Gophers are members of the Big Ten Conference and played their home games at TCF Bank Stadium. They were led by head coach Jerry Kill for his first season as head coach at Minnesota. They finished with 3–9 overall record, 2–6 in Big Ten Legends play.

== Schedule ==
| Date | Time | Opponent | Site | TV | Result | Attendance | Source |
|---|---|---|---|---|---|---|---|
| September 3 | 2:30 pm | at No. 25 USC* | Los Angeles Memorial Coliseum; Los Angeles | ABC/ESPN2 | L 17–19 | 68,273 | |
| September 10 | 2:30 pm | New Mexico State* | TCF Bank Stadium; Minneapolis | BTN | L 21–28 | 48,807 | |
| September 17 | 2:30 pm | Miami (OH)* | TCF Bank Stadium; Minneapolis | BTN | W 29–23 | 49,950 | |
| September 24 | 6:00 pm | No. 12 (FCS) North Dakota State* | TCF Bank Stadium; Minneapolis | BTN | L 24–37 | 48,802 | |
| October 1 | 11:00 am | at No. 19 Michigan | Michigan Stadium; Ann Arbor, Michigan (Little Brown Jug) | BTN | L 0–58 | 111,106 | |
| October 8 | 11:00 am | at Purdue | Ross–Ade Stadium; West Lafayette, Indiana | ESPN | L 17–45 | 38,207 | |
| October 22 | 2:30 pm | No. 13 Nebraska^{†} | TCF Bank Stadium; Minneapolis | ABC/ESPN2 | L 14–41 | 49,187 | |
| October 29 | 2:30 pm | Iowa | TCF Bank Stadium; Minneapolis (Battle for Floyd of Rosedale) | BTN | W 22–21 | 46,543 | |
| November 5 | 11:00 am | at No. 15 Michigan State | Spartan Stadium; East Lansing, Michigan | BTN | L 24–31 | 72,219 | |
| November 12 | 2:30 pm | No. 16 Wisconsin | TCF Bank Stadium; Minneapolis (Battle for Paul Bunyan's Axe) | BTN | L 13–42 | 49,158 | |
| November 19 | 11:00 am | at Northwestern | Ryan Field; Evanston, Illinois | BTN | L 13–28 | 27,050 | |
| November 26 | 2:30 pm | Illinois | TCF Bank Stadium; Minneapolis | BTN | W 27–7 | 41,549 | |
*Non-conference game; ^{†}Homecoming; Rankings from Coaches' Poll released prior to the game; All times are in Central time

== Game summaries ==
=== @ USC ===
Matt Barkley threw three touchdowns to Robert Woods as the Trojans won their 14th straight season opener. Barkley went 34-of-45 with 304 yards while Woods caught 17 passes, a USC single-game record, for 177 yards in the win. D.J. Morgan added 18 carries for 70 yards in the win for USC.

Duane Bennett ran for a touchdown while Max Shortell threw for a touchdown but was intercepted on the final drive for the Golden Gophers, who failed to win in the debut of new head coach Jerry Kill.

Bennett finished with 53 yards on 15 carries while MarQueis Gray went 7-of-12 with 94 yards and added 48 yards on 16 carries for Minnesota, which went just 3–9 last season.

The Gophers never led in the game, but made it a one-score possession with 8:03 to play when Shortell hit Brandon Green on a short pass to the left and the receiver curled around his defender and into the end zone from 12 yards out to make it 19–17.

Minnesota got the ball back at its own nine-yard line with just over two minutes to play. However, the drive only made it to the Minnesota 28 and on 3rd-and-1 Shortell was picked off by Torin Harris and the Trojans killed off the rest of the clock.

=== Vs. New Mexico State ===
Aside from losing the game 28–21, this game represented a scare for Minnesota outside of the game itself as head coach Jerry Kill had a seizure with 20 seconds left in the game and was taken away by ambulance.

Kill was stabilized, and Minnesota's team physician said the coach's condition was not life-threatening. Kill has had similar episodes three times before in his career, but never missed a game, and his assistants said they weren't worried.

Regarding the game, the Aggies set the tone from the start with a six-play, 60-yard drive. Manley hit Rogers for a 26-yard score, with cornerback Brock Vereen and safety Shady Salamon failing to reach Rogers in time. Manley had help from Robert Clay, who rushed 20 times for 97 yards and a touchdown. Taveon Rogers had 88 yards receiving and two scores.

MarQueis Gray had another uneven performance at quarterback for the Gophers, who hadn't lost their first two games to start a season since 1992. Da'Jon McKnight made a handful of acrobatic catches, finishing with 146 yards and one touchdown, and tight end Colin McGarry dived to haul in a 10-yard score in the corner of the end zone and pull the Gophers within 21–14 right before the half.

Gray, who was relieved in the third quarter by freshman Max Shortell because he had cramps on a hot day, finished with 110 yards rushing on 17 attempts. He went 16 for 32 through the air for 211 yards, two touchdowns and two interceptions. Gray threaded a perfect pass to McKnight on a quick post route for a 4-yard touchdown with 11:47 left, pulling the Gophers within 28–21.

He nearly tied the game later on a rollout with a head-first dive at the pylon with 7:51 left, and the initial ruling on the field was a touchdown. But a replay review determined his foot was out of bounds.

On fourth and 1, Edwards was stopped and NMSU took over.

Clay and Victor Johnson ground down the clock for the Aggies, and the Gophers didn't get the ball back until 2:09 remained, starting at their own 11-yard line with no timeouts. This proved to be too much for the Gophers to overcome.

=== Iowa ===
| Team | 1 | 2 | 3 | 4 | Total |
|---|---|---|---|---|---|
| Iowa | 0 | 7 | 7 | 7 | 21 |
| • Minnesota | 0 | 7 | 3 | 12 | 22 |

- Date: October 29
- Location: TCF Bank Stadium, Minneapolis
- Game start: 2:30 p.m. CDT
- Television network: BTN

Scoring summary
| 2 | 5:06 | IOWA | Marvin McNutt 12-yard pass from James Vandenberg (Mike Meyer kick) | IOWA 7-0 |
| 2 | 1:13 | MINN | Collin McGarry 3-yard pass from MarQueis Gray (Jordan Wettstein kick) | Tied 7-7 |
| 3 | 8:44 | IOWA | Marcus Coker 1-yard run (Mike Meyer kick) | IOWA 14-7 |
| 3 | 2:03 | MINN | Jordan Wettstein 28-yard field goal | IOWA 14-10 |
| 4 | 13:51 | IOWA | Marcus Coker 1-yard run (Mike Meyer kick) | IOWA 21-10 |
| 4 | 8:22 | MINN | Duane Bennett 1-yard run (pass failed) | IOWA 21-16 |
| 4 | 2:48 | MINN | MarQueis Gray 3-yard run (run failed) | MINN 22-21 |

== Roster ==
2011 Minnesota Golden Gophers football team roster
Players
Coaches
Offense

| Pos. | # | Name | Class |
|---|---|---|---|
| FB | 30 | Mike Henry | So |
| OL | 52 | Zac Epping | Fr |
| OL | 53 | Tommy Olson | Fr |
| OL | 58 | Ed Olson | So |
| OL | 60 | Ryan Wynn | Sr |
| OL | 62 | Zach Mottla | So |
| OL | 63 | Jon Christenson | Fr |
| OL | 64 | Caleb Bak | Fr |
| OL | 65 | Josh Campion | Fr |
| OL | 66 | Luke McAvoy | Fr |
| OL | 68 | Chris Bunders | Sr |
| OL | 69 | Jacob Glickstein | Jr |
| OL | 70 | Sean Ferguson | Fr |
| OL | 71 | Kyle McAvoy | Fr |
| OL | 73 | Joe Bjorklund | Fr |
| OL | 74 | Marek Lenkiewicz | Fr |
| OL | 75 | Brooks Michel | So |
| OL | 76 | Jimmy Gjere | Fr |
| OL | 77 | Foster Bush | Fr |
| OL | 78 | Ryan Orton | Sr |
| QB | 3 | Dexter Foreman | Fr |
| QB | 5 | MarQueis Gray | Jr |
| QB | 11 | Max Shortell | Fr |
| QB | 12 | Moses Alipate | So |
| QB | 16 | Tom Parish | Fr |
| QB | 19 | Adam Lueck | Jr |
| RB | 20 | Donnell Kirkwood | Fr |
| RB | 22 | Duane Bennett | Sr |
| RB | 25 | Devon Wright | Fr |
| RB | 27 | David Cobb | Fr |
| RB | 31 | Cole Banham | Fr |
| RB | 32 | Lamonte Edwards | Fr |
| RB | 33 | Cameron Gatling | Jr |
| TE | 42 | Ernie Heifort | Fr |
| TE | 45 | Gavin Bronson | Fr |
| TE | 47 | Alex Bisch | Fr |
| TE | 81 | John Rabe | Jr |
| TE | 83 | Drew Goodger | Fr |
| TE | 85 | Eric Lair | Sr |
| TE | 87 | Sahr Ngekia | So |
| TE | 88 | Collin McGarry | Sr |
| WR | 1 | Brandon Green | Jr |
| WR | 2 | Ge'Shun Harris | Jr |
| WR | 6 | Da'Jon McKnight | Sr |
| WR | 8 | Cameron Wilson | Fr |
| WR | 13 | J.D. Pride | Fr |
| WR | 14 | Connor Cosgrove | Fr |
| TE | 85 | Bryce Witham | Jr |
| WR | 14 | Matt Kloss | Jr |
| WR | 15 | Marcus Jones | Fr |
| WR | 17 | C.J. Cesario | Fr |
| WR | 18 | Derrick Engel | Jr |
| WR | 23 | Luke Trucilla | Fr |
| WR | 80 | Devin Crawford-Tufts | So |
| WR | 82 | A.J. Barker | So |
| WR | 84 | Victor Keise | So |
| WR | 86 | Malcolm Moulton | So |
| WR | 89 | Logan Hutton | Fr |

Defense

| Pos. | # | Name | Class |
|---|---|---|---|
| CB | 11 | Troy Stoudermire | Sr |
| CB | 27 | Cedric Thompson | Fr |
| DB | 3 | Kim Royston | Sr |
| DB | 5 | Johnny Johnson | Sr |
| DB | 6 | Michael Carter | Jr |
| DB | 7 | Tyrone Bouie | Fr |
| DB | 9 | Christyn Lewis | Sr |
| DB | 13 | Derrick Wells | Fr |
| DB | 14 | Kyle Henderson | Sr |
| DB | 16 | Steven Montgomery | Fr |
| DB | 21 | Brock Vereen | So |
| DB | 23 | Grayson Levine | Fr |
| DB | 24 | James Manuel | So |
| DB | 28 | Kenny Watkins | So |
| DB | 29 | Shady Salamon | Sr |
| DL | 36 | Chase Haviland | So |
| DB | 40 | Nathan Tow-Arnett | Jr |
| DB | 45 | Bryan Klitzke | Sr |
| DE | 49 | Matt Garin | So |
| DE | 55 | Thieren Cockran | Fr |
| DE | 91 | Kendall Gregory-McGhee | So |
| DB | 92 | Leston Simpson | Jr |
| DE | 93 | Ben Perry | Fr |
| DE | 95 | D.L. Wilhite | Jr |
| DE | 98 | Michael Amaefula | Fr |
| DE | 99 | Ra'Shede Hageman | So |
| DL | 46 | Cameron Botticelli | Fr |
| DL | 62 | Eric Jacques | So |
| DL | 67 | David Stommes | So |
| DL | 89 | Curran Delaney | Jr |
| DL | 90 | Austin Hahn | Jr |
| DL | 94 | Harold Legania | Fr |
| DL | 97 | Anthony Jacobs | Sr |
| DT | 96 | Brandon Kirksey | Sr |
| LB | 1 | Drendan Beal | So |
| LB | 4 | Keanon Cooper | Jr |
| LB | 8 | Spencer Reeves | Jr |
| LB | 17 | Peter Westerhaus | Fr |
| LB | 26 | Mike Rallis | Jr |
| LB | 34 | Jephte Matilus | Fr |
| LB | 35 | Dominic Schultz | Fr |
| LB | 39 | Gabe Mezzenga | Fr |
| LB | 43 | Ryan Grant | Jr |
| LB | 44 | Brent Singleton | So |
| LB | 47 | Quinn Baudcco | Fr |
| LB | 48 | Judd Paffrath | Jr |
| LB | 50 | Patrick Sveum | Sr |
| LB | 51 | Gary Tinsley | Sr |
| LB | 57 | Aaron Hill | So |
| LB | 59 | Joey Balthazor | So |

Special teams

| Pos. | # | Name | Class |
|---|---|---|---|
| K | 7 | Chris Hawthorne | So |
| K | 31 | David Platner | Fr |
| K | 38 | David Schwerman | Sr |
| K | 39 | Jordan Wettstein | Jr |
| LS | 40 | Jared Hartman | Fr |
| LS | 48 | Jake Filkins | So |
| LS | 96 | Dave Ramlet | Fr |
| P | 37 | Peter Mortell | Fr |
| P | 41 | Dan Orseske | So |
