= Willie Germany =

American football player (born 1948)

No. 31, 48, 29
- Position: Defensive back

Personal information
- Born: May 9, 1948 (age 78); Columbus, Georgia, U.S.
- Listed height: 6 ft 0 in (1.83 m)
- Listed weight: 192 lb (87 kg)

Career information
- High school: Howard (MD)
- College: Morgan State
- NFL draft: 1971: 7th round, 166th overall pick

Career history
- Atlanta Falcons (1972); Detroit Lions (1973); Houston Oilers (1975); New England Patriots (1976)

Career NFL statistics
- Interceptions: 2
- Fumble recoveries: 3
- TDs: 1
- Stats at Pro Football Reference

Willie James Germany Jr. (born May 9, 1948) is an American former professional football player who was a defensive back for four years in the National Football League (NFL). He played college football for the Morgan State Bears.

== Background ==
Germany was born in Columbus, Georgia, he went to Howard High School (Ellicott City, Maryland) and he attended college at Morgan State University in Baltimore, Maryland.

== Career ==
Drafted by the Washington Redskins in the seventh round (166th overall) of the 1971 NFL draft, Germany played in 42 games during his four-year NFL career. A journeyman defensive back, Germany played for the Atlanta Falcons, the Detroit Lions, the Houston Oilers and the New England Patriots.
