= Tyvis Powell =

American gridiron football player (born 1994)

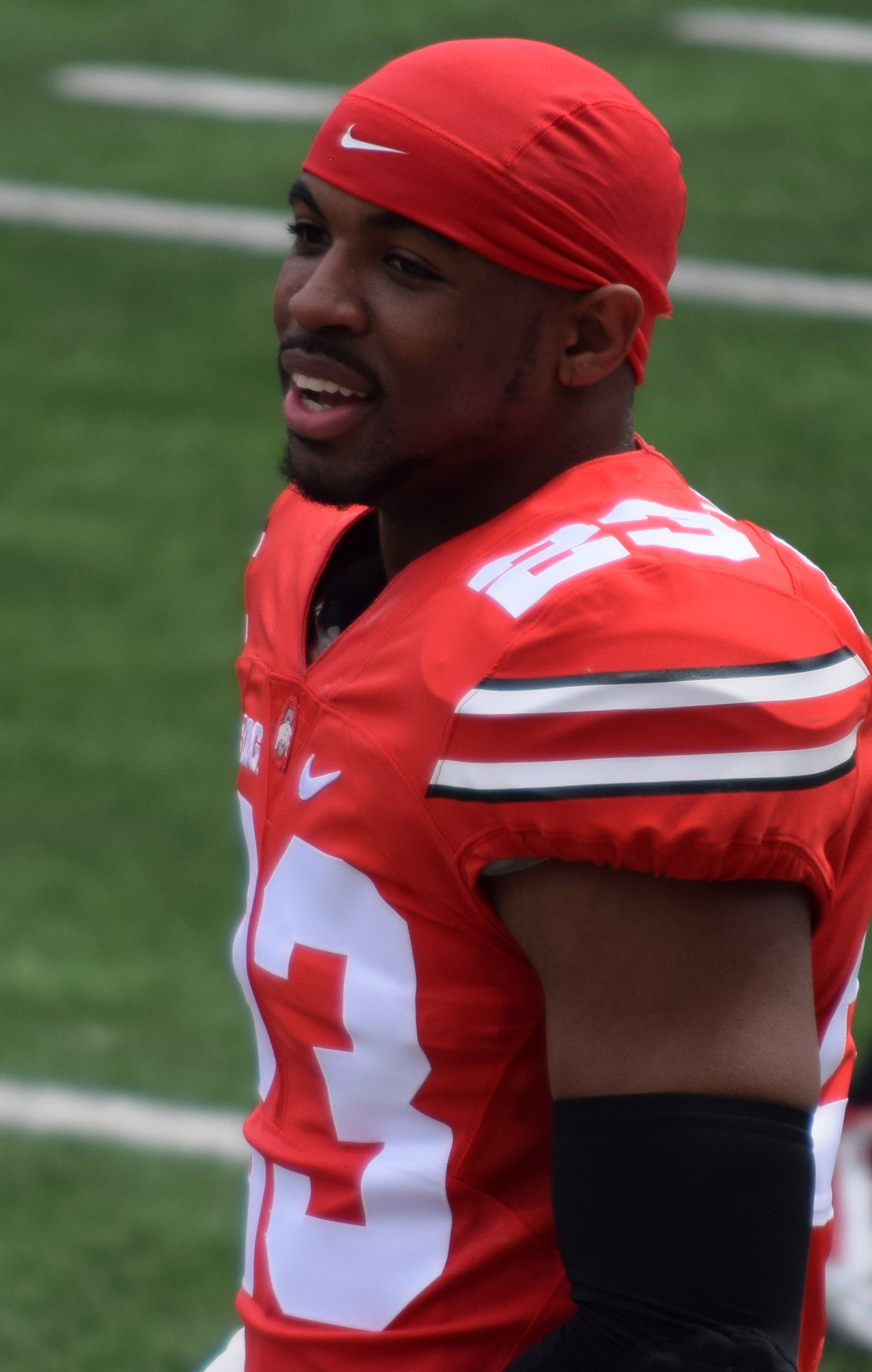
- Powell with Ohio State in 2015

No. 40, 45, 30
- Position: Safety

Personal information
- Born: February 16, 1994 (age 32); Bedford, Ohio, U.S.
- Listed height: 6 ft 3 in (1.91 m)
- Listed weight: 210 lb (95 kg)

Career information
- High school: Bedford
- College: Ohio State (2012–2015)
- NFL draft: 2016: undrafted

Career history
- Seattle Seahawks (2016); Cleveland Browns (2017)*; Indianapolis Colts (2017); Seattle Seahawks (2017)*; San Francisco 49ers (2017–2018); New York Jets (2018)*; San Francisco 49ers (2018); Houston Texans (2019)*; Dallas Cowboys (2019)*; Denver Broncos (2019–2020)*; BC Lions (2021)*
- * Offseason or practice squad member only

Awards and highlights
- CFP national champion (2014); CFP National Championship Game Defensive MVP (2015)

Career NFL statistics
- Total tackles: 14
- Forced fumbles: 1
- Stats at Pro Football Reference

Tyvis Chansey Powell (born February 16, 1994) is an American former professional football player who was a safety in the National Football League (NFL). He played college football for the Ohio State Buckeyes.

== Early life ==
Powell attended Bedford High School in Bedford, Ohio. He was rated by Rivals.com as a three-star recruit and was scouted by several large NCAA Division I universities including, but not limited to: Michigan State, Minnesota, West Virginia and Ohio State. Immediately following the resignation of then-Ohio State head coach Jim Tressel, Powell committed to Ohio State on June 1, 2011.

== College career ==
Following his verbal commitment to Ohio State in June 2011, Powell accepted an athletic scholarship to play for coach Urban Meyer's Buckeyes in the fall of 2012. Powell was redshirted in 2012 and did not play during the season. This would save his eligibility to begin play the following year.

In 2013, Powell began his collegiate career as a backup safety to Corey Brown. Powell would appear in all 14 games with five starts as a redshirt freshman in 2013, including a starting appearance at safety in the Orange Bowl. He would conclude the season with 48 tackles and one interception. His one interception would come against Michigan as he would intercept Devin Gardner's late two-point conversion attempt to seal Ohio State's 42–41 win.

As a sophomore in 2014, he started all 15 games, recording 76 tackles and four interceptions. He was named the Defensive MVP of the 2015 College Football Playoff National Championship victory over Oregon Ducks after he had a game-high nine tackles.

As a junior in 2015, Powell started all 13 games and had 71 tackles and three interceptions. After the season, he entered the 2016 NFL draft.

=== College statistics ===
Season	Team	GP	Defense				
Season	Team	GP	Cmb	TfL	PD	Int	FF
2013	Ohio State	13	48	1.0	2	1	0
2014	Ohio State	15	76	2.0	4	4	1
2015	Ohio State	13	71	0.5	3	3	0
Career		41	195	3.5	9	8	1

== Professional career ==
=== Pre-draft ===
Powell was rated the 9th best free safety in the 2016 NFL draft by NFLDraftScout.com.

Pre-draft measurables
Height	Weight	Arm length	Hand span	40-yard dash	10-yard split	20-yard split	20-yard shuttle	Three-cone drill	Vertical jump	Broad jump	Bench press
6 ft 2 3/4 in (1.90 m)	211 lb (96 kg)	32 in (0.81 m)	9 1/2 in (0.24 m)	4.46 s	1.60 s	2.62 s	4.25 s	7.03 s	34.5 in (0.88 m)	10 ft 0 in (3.05 m)	15 reps
All values from NFL Combine

=== Seattle Seahawks (first stint) ===
Powell signed with the Seattle Seahawks as an undrafted free agent following the 2016 NFL draft. He was released by the Seahawks on January 4, 2017.

=== Cleveland Browns ===
On February 6, 2017, Powell was claimed off waivers by the Cleveland Browns. He was waived by the Browns on June 9, 2017.

=== Indianapolis Colts ===
On June 12, 2017, Powell was claimed off waivers by the Indianapolis Colts. He was waived/injured on September 2, 2017, and was placed on injured reserve. He was released on September 12, 2017.

=== Seattle Seahawks (second stint) ===
On September 19, 2017, Powell was signed to the Seahawks' practice squad. He was released on September 26, 2017, but re-signed a few days later. He was released on October 24, 2017.

=== San Francisco 49ers (first stint) ===
On November 1, 2017, Powell was signed to the San Francisco 49ers' practice squad. He was promoted to the active roster on December 16, 2017.

On September 1, 2018, Powell was waived by the 49ers and was signed to the practice squad the next day. He was promoted to the active roster on September 22, 2018. He was waived on October 6, 2018, and was re-signed to the practice squad. He was promoted to the active roster on October 20, 2018. On November 1, 2018, he started at Free Safety in the 49ers' Week 9 game against the Oakland Raiders. Powell recorded three tackles in San Francisco's 34–3 win. He was waived on November 12, 2018.

=== New York Jets ===
On December 4, 2018, Powell was signed to the New York Jets practice squad, but was released a week later.

=== San Francisco 49ers (second stint) ===
Powell with the San Francisco 49ersin 2018

On December 18, 2018, Powell signed with the 49ers.

=== Houston Texans ===
On July 27, 2019, Powell signed with the Houston Texans. He was waived on August 3, 2019.

=== Dallas Cowboys ===
On August 5, 2019, Powell was signed by the Dallas Cowboys. He was waived/injured during final roster cuts on August 31, and reverted to the team's injured reserve list the next day. He was waived from injured reserve with an injury settlement on September 6.

=== Denver Broncos ===
On November 12, 2019, Powell was signed to the Denver Broncos practice squad. He signed a reserve/future contract with the Broncos on December 31, 2019. He was waived on April 27, 2020.

=== BC Lions ===
Powell signed with the BC Lions of the CFL on June 16, 2021. On July 28, 2021, he was released.
