= Peter Westerhaus =

American football player (born 1992)

No. 18
- Position: Linebacker

Personal information
- Born: December 4, 1992 (age 33); Chanhassen, Minnesota, U.S.
- Listed height: 6 ft 3 in (1.91 m)
- Listed weight: 230 lb (104 kg)

Career information
- High school: Victoria (MN) Holy Family Catholic
- College: Minnesota (2011–2015)

Peter Westerhaus (born December 4, 1992) is an American football player who played for the Minnesota Golden Gophers.

Peter attended Holy Family Catholic in Victoria, Minnesota, where he won the Minnesota Mr. Football Award in 2010 while leading the Fire to the Class 3A state championship game, where they lost to Lourdes High School. He was named second-team All-American as a tight end by Rivals.com. Westerhaus was forced to retire from football because of ulcerative colitis. On May 4, 2014, he received the Courage Award from The Minnesota Chapter of the National Football Foundation for his strength in overcoming adversity.

College recruiting
Name	Hometown	School	Height	Weight	40^{‡}	Commit date
Peter Westerhaus; LB	Chanhassen, MN	Holy Family Catholic	6 ft 3 in (1.91 m)	230 lb (100 kg)	--	Jul 25, 2010
Peter Westerhaus; LB	Recruit ratings: Scout: Rivals: (76)					
Overall recruit ranking: Scout: 46 (LB) Rivals: 72 (LB), 3 (MN) ESPN: 100 (LB), 139 (Regional), 3 (MN)
Note: In many cases, Scout, Rivals, 247Sports, On3, and ESPN may conflict in their listings of height and weight.; In these cases, the average was taken. ESPN grades are on a 100-point scale.; Sources: "Minnesota Football Commitment List". Rivals.; "Minnesota College Football Recruiting Commits". Scout.; "ESPN". ESPN.; "Scout.com Team Recruiting Rankings". Scout.; "2012 Team Ranking". Rivals.com.
