= K. J. Maye =

American gridiron football player (born 1994)

North Dakota Fighting Hawks
- Title: Wide receivers coach

Personal information
- Born: February 25, 1994 (age 32); Mobile, Alabama, U.S.
- Listed height: 5 ft 8 in (1.73 m)
- Listed weight: 191 lb (87 kg)

Career information
- High school: Murphy (Mobile)
- College: Minnesota (2012–2015)
- NFL draft: 2016: undrafted

Career history

Playing
- New York Giants (2016)*; Tennessee Titans (2016–2017)*; Edmonton Eskimos (2017)*; New England Patriots (2017–2018)*; YCF Grit (2019); Tampa Bay Vipers (2020)*
- * Offseason or practice squad member only

Coaching
- Vigor HS (AL) (2023–2024) Offensive coordinator; North Alabama (2025) Wide receivers coach; North Dakota (2026–present) Wide receivers coach
- Stats at Pro Football Reference

K. J. Maye (born February 25, 1994) is an American former football wide receiver. He is currently the wide receivers coach at the University of North Dakota, a position he has held since 2026. He played college football at Minnesota, and was originally signed by the New York Giants of the National Football League (NFL) as an undrafted free agent in 2016. He has also been a member of the Tennessee Titans, Edmonton Eskimos, New England Patriots, and Tampa Bay Vipers.

== College statistics ==
Minnesota Golden Gophers
Season	Receiving					Rushing		
Season	Rec	Yards	Avg	TD	Att	Yards	Avg	TD
2012	11	49	4.5	0	17	57	3.4	0
2013	7	70	10.0	0	2	19	9.5	0
2014	16	298	18.6	1	23	144	6.3	1
2015	73	773	10.6	5	9	46	5.1	1
Career	107	1,190	11.1	6	51	266	5.2	2

== Professional career ==
Pre-draft measurables
Height	Weight	Arm length	Hand span	40-yard dash	10-yard split	20-yard split	20-yard shuttle	Three-cone drill	Vertical jump	Broad jump
5 ft 8 1/8 in (1.73 m)	191 lb (87 kg)	30 1/2 in (0.77 m)	8 1/4 in (0.21 m)	4.61 s	1.62 s	2.68 s	4.35 s	7.18 s	33.0 in (0.84 m)	9 ft 5 in (2.87 m)

=== New York Giants ===
Maye went undrafted in the 2016 NFL draft. On April 30, 2016, he signed with the New York Giants as an undrafted free agent. On August 30, 2016, he was waived by the Giants.

=== Tennessee Titans ===
On December 28, 2016, Maye was signed to the Titans' practice squad. He signed a reserve/future contract with the Titans on January 2, 2017.

On May 19, 2017, Maye was waived by the Titans.

=== New England Patriots ===
On July 30, 2017, Maye signed with the New England Patriots. He was waived by the Patriots on September 2, 2017.

On August 27, 2018, Maye was re-signed by the Patriots. On September 1, Maye was released as part of the roster cutdown.

=== Tampa Bay Vipers ===
Maye was selected by the Tampa Bay Vipers of the XFL during the final stage of the league's inaugural draft on October 16, 2019. He signed a contract with the team on December 22, 2019. He was waived during final roster cuts on January 22, 2020.
