= Howard High School (Maryland) =

Public high school in Columbia, Maryland, U.S.

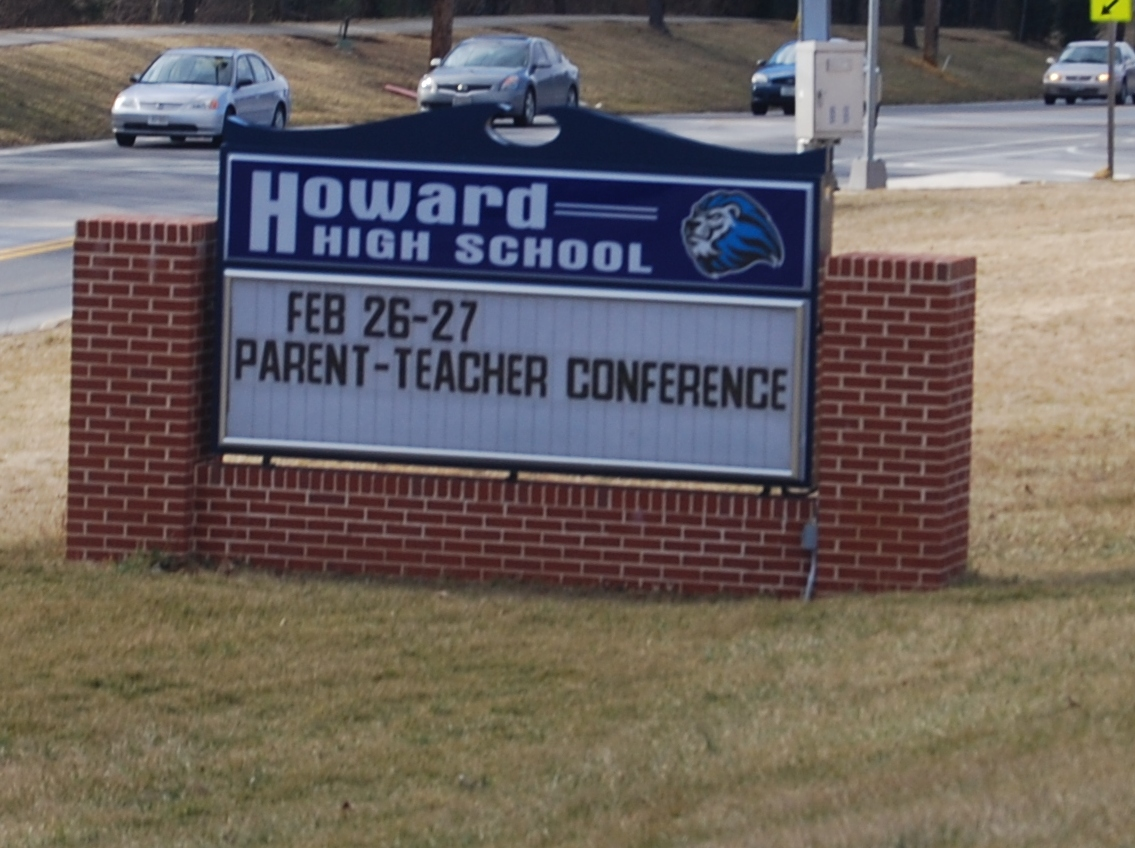

Location
- 8700 Old Annapolis Road; Ellicott City, Maryland 21043; United States; 39°13′35″N 76°48′45″W

Information
- Type: Public high school
- Motto: Excellence in Teaching and Learning
- Established: 1952
- School district: Howard County Public School System
- Superintendent: William Barnes
- CEEB code: 210510
- Principal: Allen Cosentino
- Enrollment: 1,741 (2022-2023 school year)
- Colors: Navy, Gray, White, and Light Gray
- Mascot: Lion
- Rival: Long Reach High School
- Website: School website
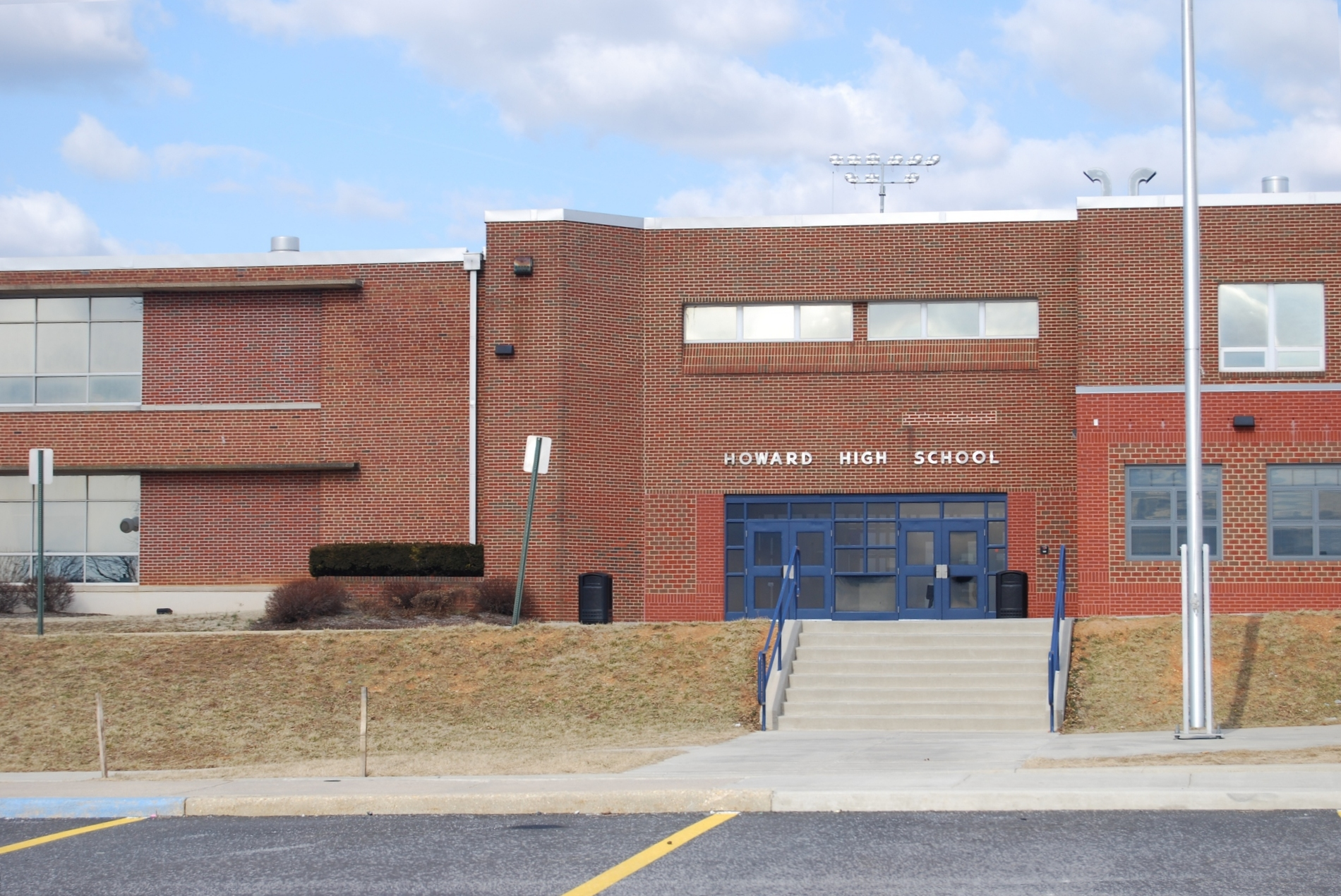
- Howard High School was opened in 1952.

Howard High School is a public high school located in Columbia, Maryland, United States. It is part of the Howard County Public School System, and serves families from Ellicott City, Elkridge, Hanover and Columbia.

== History ==
Towards the end of the Great Depression of 1929-1940, the then small Howard County government, with its Board of County Commissioners and with the advice of the equally small administration of the Howard County Public Schools system, decided in 1938 to use available designated Federal funds from the newly organized agency to fight the continuing bad economic conditions and recurring high unemployment now nine years into the downturn from the Works Progress Administration (W.P.A.) programs of the "New Deal" policies of the Presidency of Franklin Roosevelt. Several of the policies begun in earnest was directing money and bus contracts to use fose close and consolidate many of the older rural one-room wood-frame construction schoolhouses and to begin consolidation / mergers using now more easily readily available gasoline powered motorized buses to transport pupils into several central modern schools of several rooms or floors of modern brick and concrete construction. Most of the county saw little school construction before because of the poor economy and earlier First World War. After the subsequent World War II, the economy roared back more prosperous and conditions improved dramatically as the millions of soldiers and sailors returned home.

The Howard County School Board recommended a single central high school for all white students in the county although there has been an earlier small Ellicott City High School in the county seat town. By 1949, a bill to authorize issuing state bonds in a bank loan seemed imminent to be passed by the General Assembly of Maryland (state legislature) and put on the coming election ballot for approval by the voters. So plans were refined for a future requested central high school serving the first, second and sixth county districts of the eastern side.

A site was picked at the family farm of retired General and former Baltimore City Police Commissioner Charles D. Gaither (1860-1947), whose grandfather, George R. Gaither, had once raised Southern cavalry troops there for the famous General J. E. B. Stuart of the Confederate States Army and its Army of Northern Virginia in the American Civil War (1861-1865) on that site. Bids were opened on 26 April 1951 with prices ranging for architect drawings and construction from $838,000 to $683,000. Four additional rooms for the new central high school were ordered the next year in 1952 for an additional $30,000 in expenses. 12 additional acres were also purchased from the Gaither family for $5,000, with board member Charles E. Miller contributing $2,500 for the construction of the land, construction and demolition of the "colored house and corn crib" on the property.

Five names were considered in a poll for the new high school:
John Eager Howard High School,
Charles Carroll of Carrollton High School,
General Gaither High School,
Edwin Warfield High School, and
Howard County High School.

The school opened under the chosen name “Howard County Senior High School" in 1952. Two years later in 1954, Marie T. Gaither of the family offered 42 acres of adjoining land for $15,000 to expand the school grounds and campus which was for unexplained reasons declined by the School Board.

A highlight of the Howard High commencement ceremonies at its 50th anniversary was the one once attended by United States Supreme Court Justice Tom C. Clark, who arrived by helicopter from Washington, D.C., 30 miles southwest. The population is both culturally and economically diverse with over three quarters of the graduates enrolling in post-secondary institutions.

== Student population ==
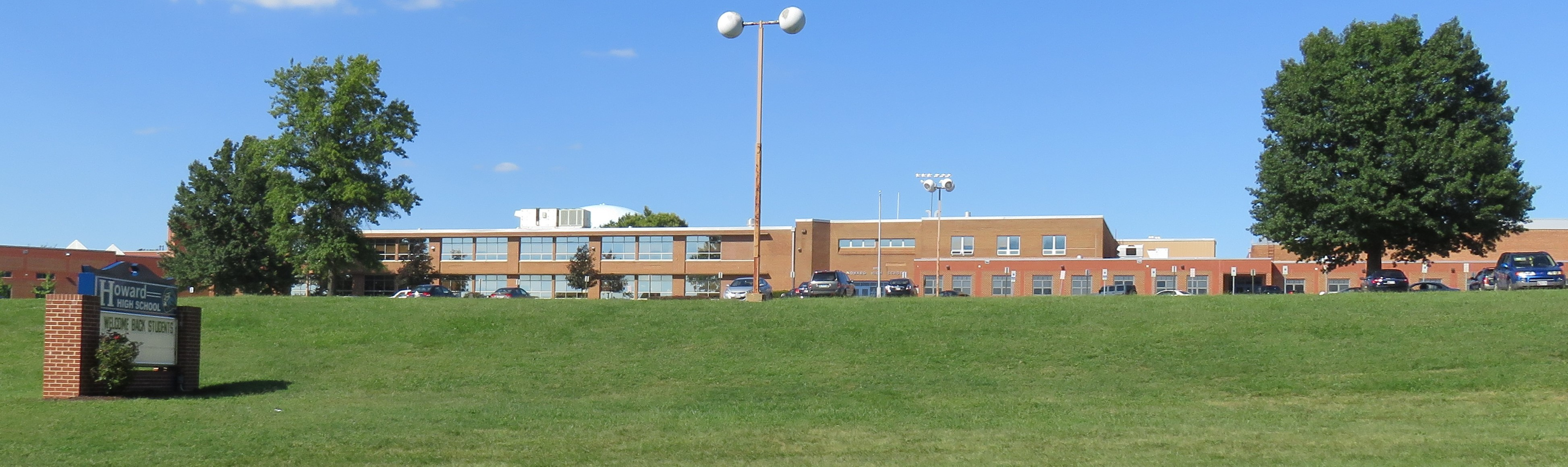
Howard High School - (2015)

Student population
2022	1,783
2021	1,818
2020	1,828
2018	1,890
2015	1,725
2014	1,750
2010	2,023
2009	1,604
2008	1,500
2007	1,362
2006	1,332
2005	1,241
2004	1,270
2003	1,199
2002	1,174
2001	1,257
2000	1,249
1999	1,242
1998	1,142
1997	1,202
1996	1,682
1995	1,484
1994	1,335
1993	1,261

== Renovation ==
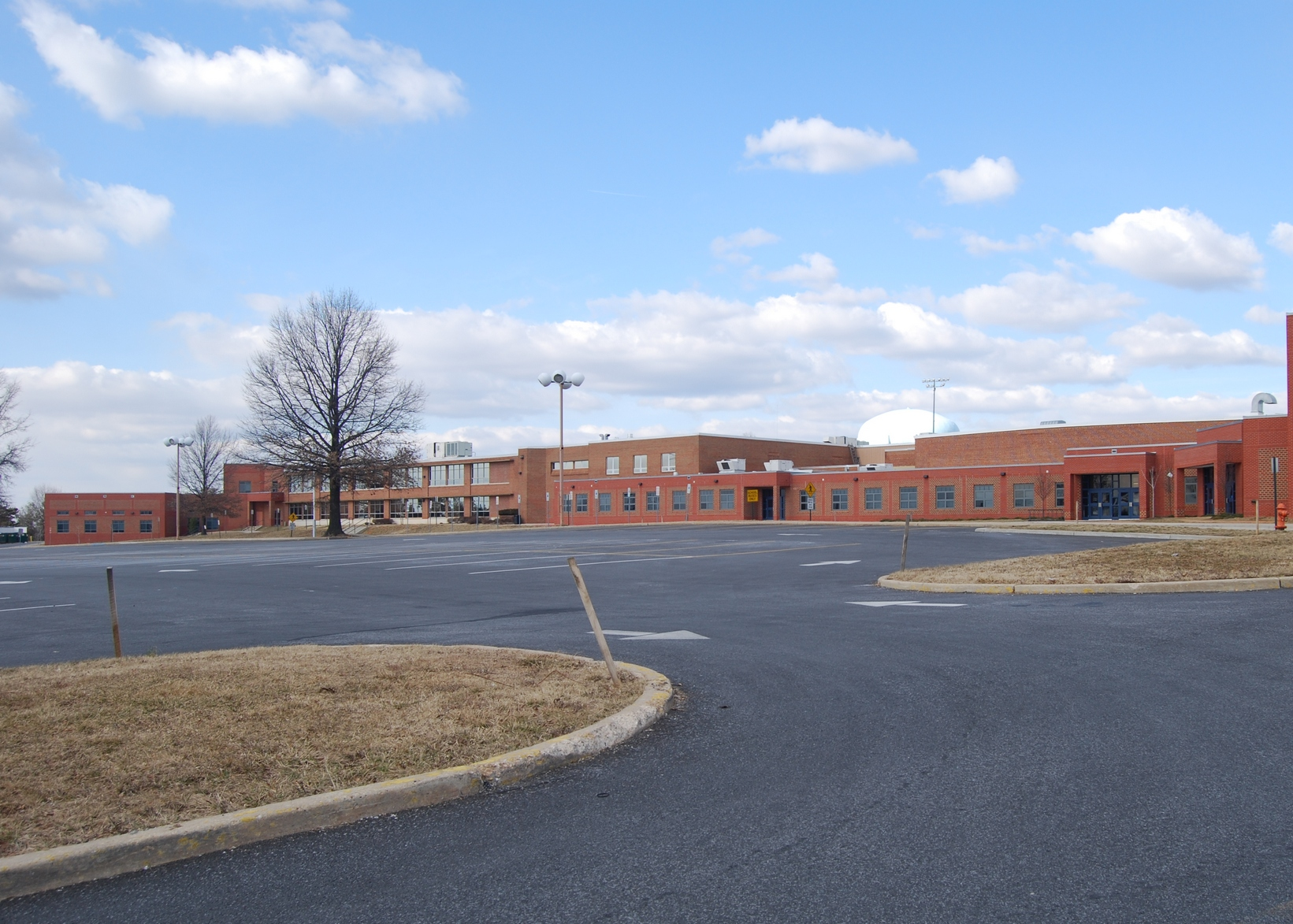
The school underwent extensive renovations in 2006.

At the opening of the 2006-2007 school year, Howard completed its renovations, which included a brand new cafeteria attached to an atrium, two new wings on opposite ends on the school, an auxiliary gym (in which the previous cafeteria was positioned), and a new track around the football field. The renovation also provided the Art and Science Department with a darkroom and several laboratories. At the end of the same school year, Howard placed a copper statue of a lion overlooking the Stadium Field.

== Athletics ==
Howard High School has won the following state championships & athletic accomplishments:

- 2021 - Girls' Track and Field
- 2021 - Girls' Cross Country County Championships
- 2019 - Girls' Cross Country
- 2015 - Boys' Lacrosse
- 2007 - Girls' Cross Country
- 2007 - Boys' Track & Field
- 2006 - Boys' Track & Field
- 2006 - Girls' Cross County
- 1995 - Girls' Track & Field
- 1994 - Girls' Basketball
- 1992 - Girls' Track & Field
- 1989 - Boys' Soccer
- 1989 - Boys' Indoor Track 2A-1A
- 1985 - Boys' Indoor Track BC
- 1985 - Boys' Track & Field
- 1984 - Boys' Indoor Track BC
- 1980 - Girls' Volleyball
- 1974 - Football

== Notable alumni ==
- Michael Chabon, Pulitzer Prize-winning author
- Winston DeLattiboudere III, NFL coach
- Bryce Hall, American social media personality
- Benny Mardones, singer-songwriter
- Alexis Ohanian, co-founder of Reddit
