= Winston DeLattiboudere III =

American football coach and former player (born 1997)

Michigan State Spartans
- Title: Defensive line coach

Personal information
- Born: January 21, 1998 (age 28); Baltimore, Maryland, U.S.
- Listed height: 6 ft 4 in (1.93 m)
- Listed weight: 275 lb (125 kg)

Career information
- Position: Defensive lineman
- High school: Howard (MD)
- College: Minnesota (2015–2019)

Career history
- Charlotte (2020) Graduate assistant; Oregon (2021) Graduate assistant; Akron (2022) Defensive line coach; Minnesota (2023) Defensive line coach; Minnesota (2024) Assistant head coach & defensive line coach; Arizona Cardinals (2025) Defensive line coach; Michigan State (2026–present) Defensive line coach

Winston DeLattiboudere III (dee-LA-tih-boo-dare; born January 21, 1998) is an American football coach who is the defensive line coach at Michigan State University. He previously served as the Arizona Cardinals of the National Football League (NFL) in 2025. He played college football at Minnesota and previously served as an assistant coach at Minnesota, Akron, Oregon and Charlotte.

== Early life and playing career ==
DeLattiboudere played five seasons as a defensive lineman for the Minnesota Golden Gophers from 2015 to 2019. He appeared in 51 games, starting 36 of them, finishing his career with 83 tackles (43 solo), 13.5 tackles for loss, and 5.0 sacks. He earned academic All-Big Ten honors in 2019, as well as the Big Ten Sportsmanship Award and his team's Tony Dungy Award for character and community service. He also won the Golden Gophers Defensive Scout Team Award as a true freshman.

== Coaching career ==
=== Early career ===
DeLattiboudere began his coaching career as a graduate assistant at University of Charlotte in 2020, where he worked with the defensive line. The following year, he joined the University of Oregon coaching staff as a graduate assistant, where he worked with future first-round NFL draft pick Kayvon Thibodeaux and other top defensive linemen.

=== Akron ===
In 2022, DeLattiboudere became the defensive line coach at Akron. There, he helped improve the defensive line's performance, especially in sacks and tackles for loss.

=== Green Bay Packers ===
In 2023, DeLattiboudere joined the Green Bay Packers under the Bill Walsh NFL diversity coaching fellowship.

=== Minnesota ===
DeLattiboudere returned to his alma mater, University of Minnesota, in 2023 as the defensive line coach, later adding the title of assistant head coach on February 2, 2024. He played a major role in Minnesota's defensive success, including increasing the team’s sack total from 19 in 2022 to 28 in 2024. Under his guidance, Minnesota's defense ranked fifth nationally in total defense in 2023.

In 2024, DeLattiboudere was selected for the American Football Coaches Association, which is aimed at identifying and developing future leaders in football coaching.

=== Arizona Cardinals ===
On February 12, 2025, DeLattiboudere joined the Arizona Cardinals as their defensive line coach under head coach Jonathan Gannon.

=== Michigan State ===
In January 2026, DeLattiboudere was hired as the defensive line coach at Michigan State University under head coach Pat Fitzgerald.

== Personal life ==
DeLattiboudere is married to his wife, Shelby.
