= Mitch Leidner =

American football player (born 1994)

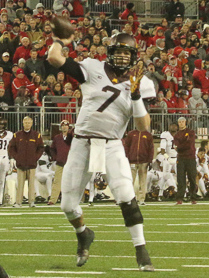
- Leidner in 2015

No. 7
- Position: Quarterback

Personal information
- Born: January 17, 1994 (age 32); Lakeville, Minnesota, U.S.
- Listed height: 6 ft 3 in (1.91 m)
- Listed weight: 226 lb (103 kg)

Career information
- High school: Lakeville South
- College: Minnesota (2012–2016)
- NFL draft: 2017: undrafted

Career history
- Minnesota Vikings (2017)*
- * Offseason or practice squad member only

Awards and highlights
- 2015 Quick Lane Bowl MVP
- Stats at Pro Football Reference

Mitchell Leidner (born January 17, 1994) is an American former college football player who was a quarterback for the Minnesota Golden Gophers. He was signed by the Minnesota Vikings of the National Football League (NFL) as an undrafted free agent.

== Early life ==
Leidner attended Lakeville South High School in Lakeville, Minnesota. He committed to the University of Minnesota to play college football.

== College career ==
Leidner played for the Golden Gophers from 2013 to 2016. He tied a school record for quarterbacks when he ran for four touchdowns in one game in 2013 against San Jose State as a redshirt freshman. After starting four games as a freshman, he took over as the full-time starter in 2014. Leidner was named the MVP of the 2015 Quick Lane Bowl. During his career, he started 41 of 47 games and passed for 7,287 yards, 34 touchdowns and 32 interceptions.

=== Statistics ===
Year	Team	Games			Passing							Rushing			
Year	Team	GP	GS	Record	Comp	Att	Yards	Pct.	TD	Int	QB rating	Att	Yards	Avg	TD
2012	Minnesota	Redshirt (redshirt)													
2013	Minnesota	10	4	3–1	43	78	619	55.1	3	1	131.9	102	407	4.0	7
2014	Minnesota	12	12	7–5	122	237	1,798	51.5	11	8	123.8	126	452	3.6	10
2015	Minnesota	13	13	6–7	242	407	2,701	59.5	14	11	121.2	107	270	2.5	6
2016	Minnesota	12	12	8–4	173	307	2,169	56.4	8	12	116.5	111	366	3.3	10
Career		47	41	24–17	580	1,029	7,287	56.4	36	32	121.2	448	1,495	3.4	33

== Professional career ==
Pre-draft measurables
Height	Weight	Arm length	Hand span	40-yard dash	10-yard split	20-yard split	20-yard shuttle	Three-cone drill	Vertical jump	Broad jump
6 ft 3 1/2 in (1.92 m)	226 lb (103 kg)	33 3/4 in (0.86 m)	10 in (0.25 m)	4.93 s	1.63 s	2.80 s	4.25 s	6.96 s	34.5 in (0.88 m)	10 ft 3 in (3.12 m)
All values from NFL Combine

Leidner signed with the Minnesota Vikings as an undrafted free agent on August 20, 2017. He was waived on September 2, 2017.
