= MarQueis Gray =

American football player (born 1989)

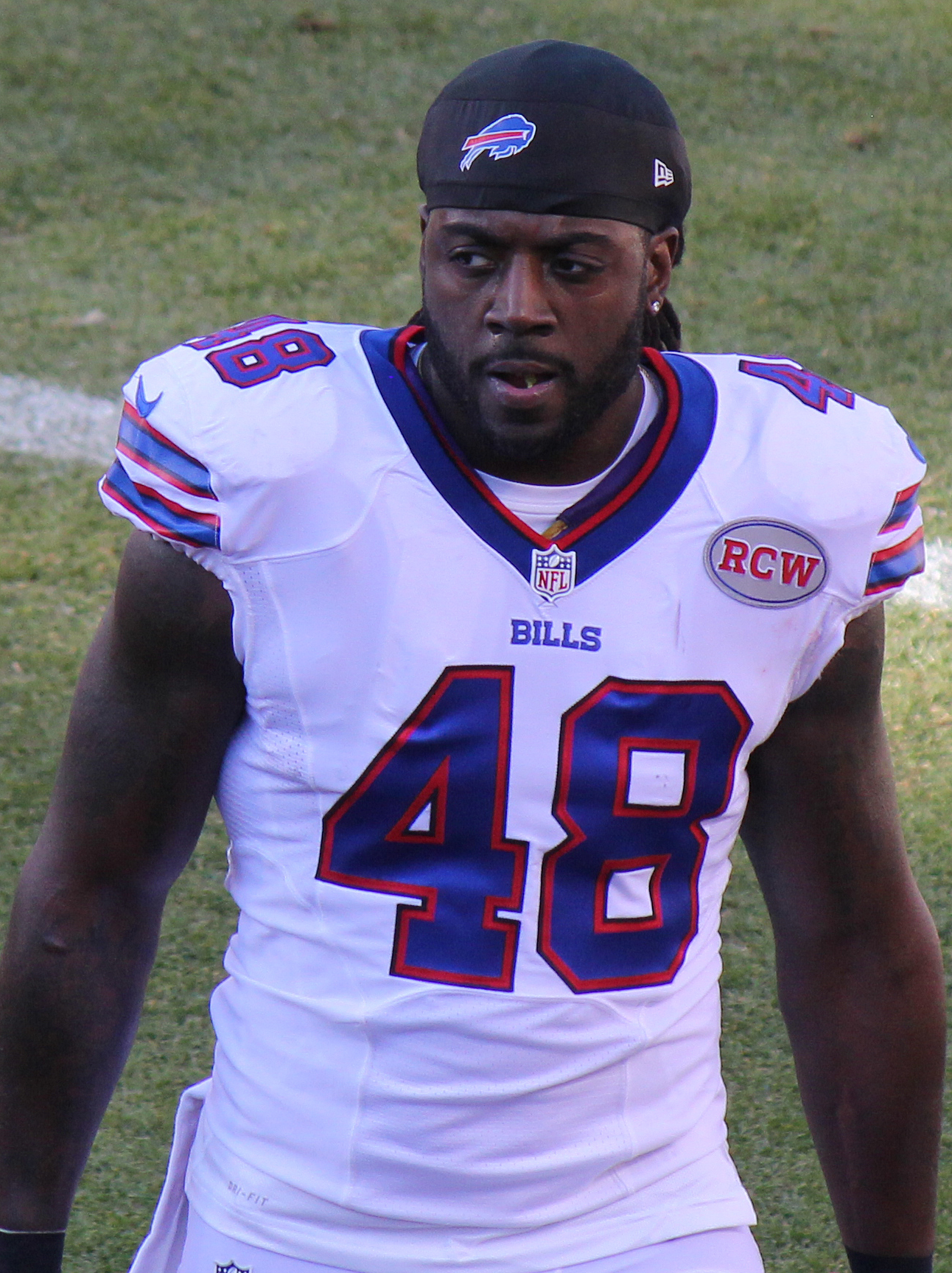
- Gray with the Buffalo Bills in 2014

No. 47, 87, 48
- Position: Tight end

Personal information
- Born: November 7, 1989 (age 37); Indianapolis, Indiana, U.S.
- Listed height: 6 ft 4 in (1.93 m)
- Listed weight: 260 lb (118 kg)

Career information
- High school: Ben Davis (Indianapolis)
- College: Minnesota (2008–2012)
- NFL draft: 2013: undrafted

Career history
- San Francisco 49ers (2013)*; Cleveland Browns (2013); Minnesota Vikings (2014); Buffalo Bills (2014–2015); Miami Dolphins (2016–2018); San Francisco 49ers (2020)*
- * Offseason or practice squad member only

Career NFL statistics
- Receptions: 27
- Receiving yards: 328
- Rushing attempts: 11
- Rushing yards: 57
- Stats at Pro Football Reference

MarQueis Gray (born November 7, 1989) is an American former professional football player who was a tight end in the National Football League (NFL). He played college football for the Minnesota Golden Gophers, and was originally signed by the San Francisco 49ers as an undrafted free agent in 2013. He was also a member of the Cleveland Browns, Minnesota Vikings, Buffalo Bills, Miami Dolphins, and San Francisco 49ers.

== Early life ==
Gray went to Ben Davis High School in Indianapolis, Indiana. There, he was coached by Mike Kirschner, where he was a three-year starter. He was rated as a four-star prospect by Rivals.com, as well as the No. 3 dual-threat quarterback in the nation and the No. 1 player in the state of Indiana by Rivals. He received four stars from Scout.com, which ranks him as the nation's No. 14 high school quarterback, and ESPN.com's No. 13 quarterback nationally, where he was selected to participate in the Elite 11 Quarterback Camp, and played in the prestigious U.S. Army All-American Bowl, completing 3-of-7 passes for 56 yards and a touchdown, while rushing for 41 yards and a touchdown. He missed the majority of his senior season after suffering a broken bone in his non-throwing arm, and saw action in just five games during 2007, including three after returning from the injury, and connected on 26-of-41 passes for 376 yards and three touchdowns while also rushing for 302 yards on 64 carries with four touchdowns and caught five passes for 86 yards and a score. As a junior, he completed 73 of 140 passes for 1,113 yards and 12 touchdowns, while rushing for 603 yards and seven touchdowns on 127 carries. He earned honorable mention class 5A all-state honors.

Gray committed to University of Minnesota on January 5, 2008. Gray also had offers of football scholarships from the University of Cincinnati, the University of Illinois, Indiana University, the University of Iowa, Kentucky University, Michigan State University, the University of Oregon, and Purdue University.

College recruiting
Name	Hometown	School	Height	Weight	40^{‡}	Commit date
MarQueis Gray; QB	Indianapolis, Indiana	Ben Davis High School	6 ft 4 in (1.93 m)	220 lb (100 kg)	4.48	Jan 5, 2008
MarQueis Gray; QB	Recruit ratings: Scout: Rivals: (80)					
Overall recruit ranking: Scout: 14 (QB) Rivals: 3 (QB), 1 (IN) ESPN: 13 (QB)
Note: In many cases, Scout, Rivals, 247Sports, On3, and ESPN may conflict in their listings of height and weight.; In these cases, the average was taken. ESPN grades are on a 100-point scale.; Sources: "Minnesota Football Commitment List (24)". Rivals.; "Minnesota College Football Recruiting Commits". Scout.; "ESPN". ESPN.; "Scout.com Team Recruiting Rankings". Scout.; "2008 Team Ranking". Rivals.com.

== College career ==
Gray was forced to sit out his true freshman season in 2008 after his ACT score was deemed invalid due to unspecified "irregularities."

Gray returned to the team in the spring of 2009 and impressed observers in the Golden Gophers' spring game. Gray played in 2009 as both a quarterback and wide receiver. He had a breakout game against Ohio State going 5-of-6 passing for 51 yards and tossing his first touchdown pass, all career highs, he also had a career day running ball against the Buckeyes with career highs of 11 carries and 81 yards. He scored his first collegiate touchdown on a reception against Cal. He finished his freshman season with 265 yards rushing, he ended the regular season as the team's fourth-leading rusher.

Gray played both positions in the Insight Bowl, inserted as a backup to starting quarterback Adam Weber going 1-of-2 for 11 yards, with three carries for 34 yards. One of those carries — in the fourth quarter — resulted in a fumble, recovered by Iowa State who were able to run out the clock for a 14–13 victory. Gray also caught two passes for 37 yards.

As a sophomore in 2010, Gray made appearances in all 12 games including seven starts at wide receiver, where he tallied 42 catches for 587 yards and hauled in five touchdowns. He also had 119 rushing yards on 23 carries while completing two of eight passes for 24 yards.

Gray was named the starting quarterback for the Gophers for the 2011 season. On the season, he passed for 1,495 yards, eight touchdowns, and eight interceptions.

In 2012, in the Gophers' second game against New Hampshire, Gray surpassed Rickey Foggie and Billy Cockerham with the fifth 100-yard rushing game of his career. He was moved to wide receiver for the rest of the season to allow Philip Nelson to start.

=== Statistics ===
Season	Team	Passing							Rushing			Receiving
Season	Team	Rating	Att	Comp	Pct	Yds	TD	INT	Att	Yds	TD	Rec	Yds	TD
2009	Minnesota	83.4	15	6	40.0	62	1	1	47	265	0	6	58	1
2010	Minnesota	50.2	8	2	25.0	24	0	0	23	110	1	42	587	5
2011	Minnesota	114.5	213	108	50.7	1,495	8	8	199	966	6	0	0	0
2012	Minnesota	146.0	59	34	57.6	472	5	2	72	390	5	12	121	0
Total		117.5	295	150	50.8	2,053	14	11	341	1,731	12	60	766	6

== Professional career ==
At the NFL Scouting Combine, Gray posted a 4.30-second 20-yard shuttle, a 7.25 three-cone drill, a 111.0-inch broad jump, a 30.0-inch vertical jump, a 15-repetition bench press, and ran a 4.73-second forty-yard dash, the fourth fastest time among quarterbacks. Though he played some wide receiver in college, Gray worked out with the quarterback group at the combine.

=== San Francisco 49ers (first stint) ===
After going undrafted at the 2013 NFL draft, Gray signed with the San Francisco 49ers. Initially Gray worked out as a halfback but soon moved to tight end. Gray was later cut by the team on August 30.

=== Cleveland Browns ===
On September 1, 2013, Gray was claimed off waivers by the Cleveland Browns. He was used mostly as a blocking tight end and a fullback/H-back, and was also the emergency third string quarterback. Gray was waived by the Browns on August 30, 2014, during the final round of roster cuts.

=== Minnesota Vikings ===
On August 31, 2014, Gray was claimed off waivers by the Minnesota Vikings, but was waived by the team on November 19, 2014, to make room for the newly acquired Ben Tate. He caught one pass with the Vikings for 16 yards, in their loss against the Green Bay Packers in Week 5.

=== Buffalo Bills ===
On November 20, 2014, Gray was claimed off waivers by the Buffalo Bills, On October 6, 2015, the Bills sent Gray to season ending injured reserve with a broken forearm. He would finish the season with just one catch for two yards in four games.

=== Miami Dolphins ===
On March 31, 2016, Gray signed with the Miami Dolphins. On December 29, 2016, he signed a two-year contract extension with the Dolphins. Gray has taken snaps at fullback as well for the Dolphins, occasionally receiving short-yardage carries. Overall, in the 2016 season, he finished with 14 receptions for 174 yards in 16 games. In the 2017 season, he appeared in all 16 games and finished with five carries for 14 yards and one reception for 10 yards.

On September 6, 2018, Gray was placed on injured reserve after suffering a torn Achilles tendon in practice, ending his season before it began. The injury did not heal correctly, so Gray underwent additional surgery in March 2019, forcing him to sit out that year's season as well; he has stated that he hopes to return to the NFL in 2020.

=== San Francisco 49ers (second stint) ===
On August 29, 2020, Gray signed with the San Francisco 49ers. He was released during final roster cutdowns on September 5.

== NFL career statistics ==
=== Regular season ===
Year	Team	Games		Rushing					Receiving					Fumbles	
Year	Team	GP	GS	Att	Yds	Avg	Lng	TD	Rec	Yds	Avg	Lng	TD	Fum	Lost
2013	CLE	12	2	6	43	5.2	18	0	2	8	4.0	5	0	0	0
2014	MIN	8	0	0	0	0.0	0	0	1	16	16.0	16	0	0	0
2014	BUF	5	5	0	0	0.0	0	0	8	118	14.8	41	0	0	0
2015	BUF	4	0	0	0	0.0	0	0	1	2	2.0	2	0	0	0
2016	MIA	16	7	0	0	0.0	0	0	14	174	12.4	53	0	0	0
2017	MIA	16	0	5	14	4.0	2.9	0	1	10	10.0	10	0	0	0
Career		61	14	11	57	5.2	18	0	27	328	12.1	53	0	0	0
