= Ryan Santoso =

American football player (born 1995)

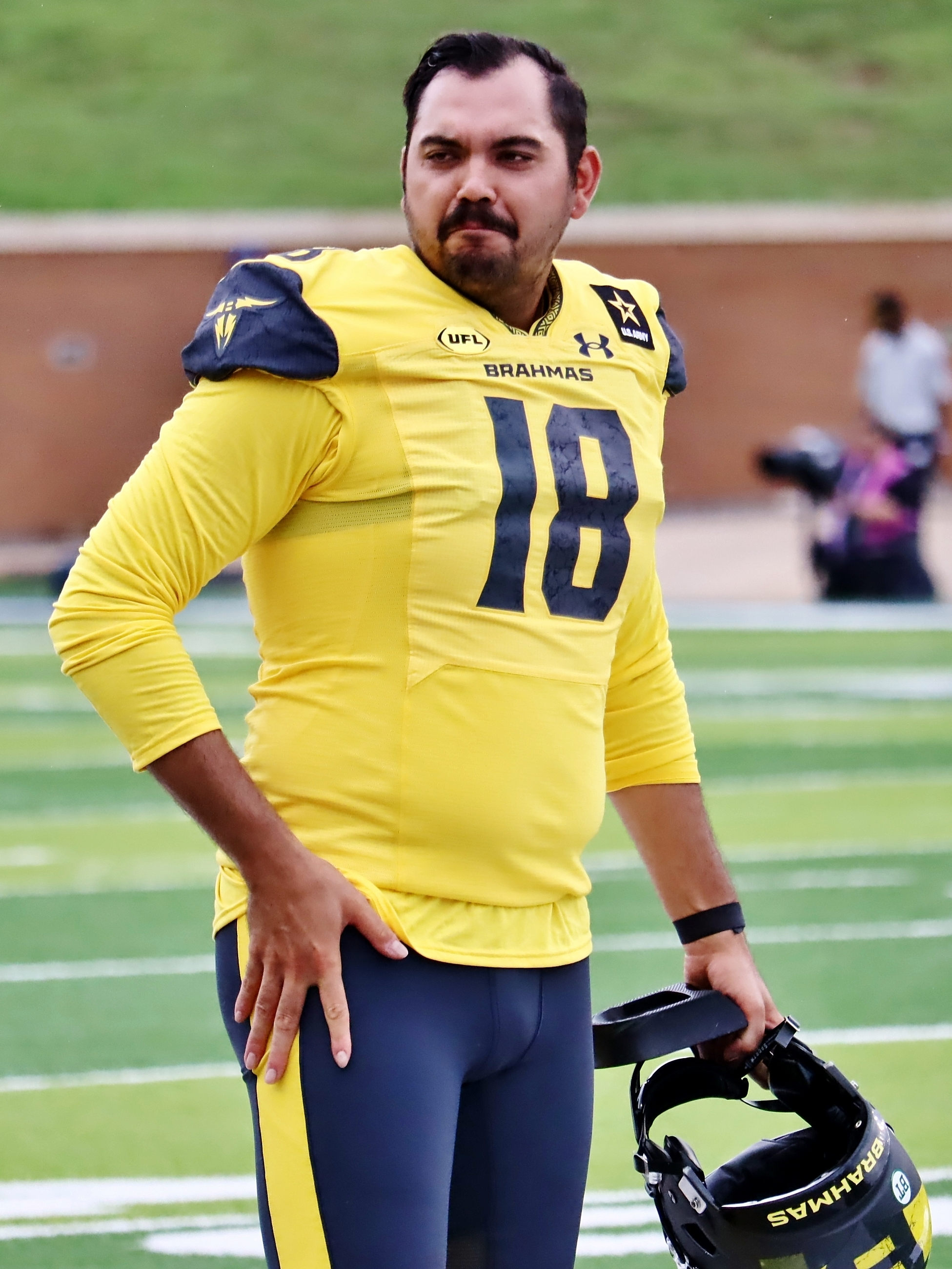
- Santoso with the San Antonio Brahmas in 2024

Profile
- Position: Placekicker

Personal information
- Born: August 26, 1995 (age 31); Pace, Florida, U.S.
- Listed height: 6 ft 5 in (1.96 m)
- Listed weight: 258 lb (117 kg)

Career information
- High school: Pace HS (Pace, FL)
- College: Minnesota
- NFL draft: 2018: undrafted

Career history
- Detroit Lions (2018–2019)*; Montreal Alouettes (2019)*; Tennessee Titans (2019); Montreal Alouettes (2020); New York Giants (2020); Carolina Panthers (2021); Tennessee Titans (2021)*; Detroit Lions (2021); Los Angeles Rams (2021)*; Jacksonville Jaguars (2022)*; New York Giants (2022)*; San Antonio Brahmas (2024)
- * Offseason or practice squad member only

Awards and highlights
- Super Bowl champion (LVI)

Career NFL statistics
- Field goals: 4
- Field goals attempted: 5
- Field goal %: 80
- Longest field goal: 35
- Touchbacks: 21
- Stats at Pro Football Reference
- Stats at CFL.ca

Ryan Santoso (born August 26, 1995) is an American-Indonesian professional football placekicker. He played college football at Minnesota and signed with the Detroit Lions as an undrafted free agent in 2018. Santoso has also been a member of the Montreal Alouettes, Tennessee Titans, New York Giants, Carolina Panthers, Los Angeles Rams, Jacksonville Jaguars, and San Antonio Brahmas.

== College career ==
=== Recruiting profile ===
Santoso was the seventh-ranked kicker and a two-star recruit out of Pace High School in Pace, Florida. He signed a letter of intent to play college football at the University of Minnesota on December 25, 2012.

=== Minnesota ===
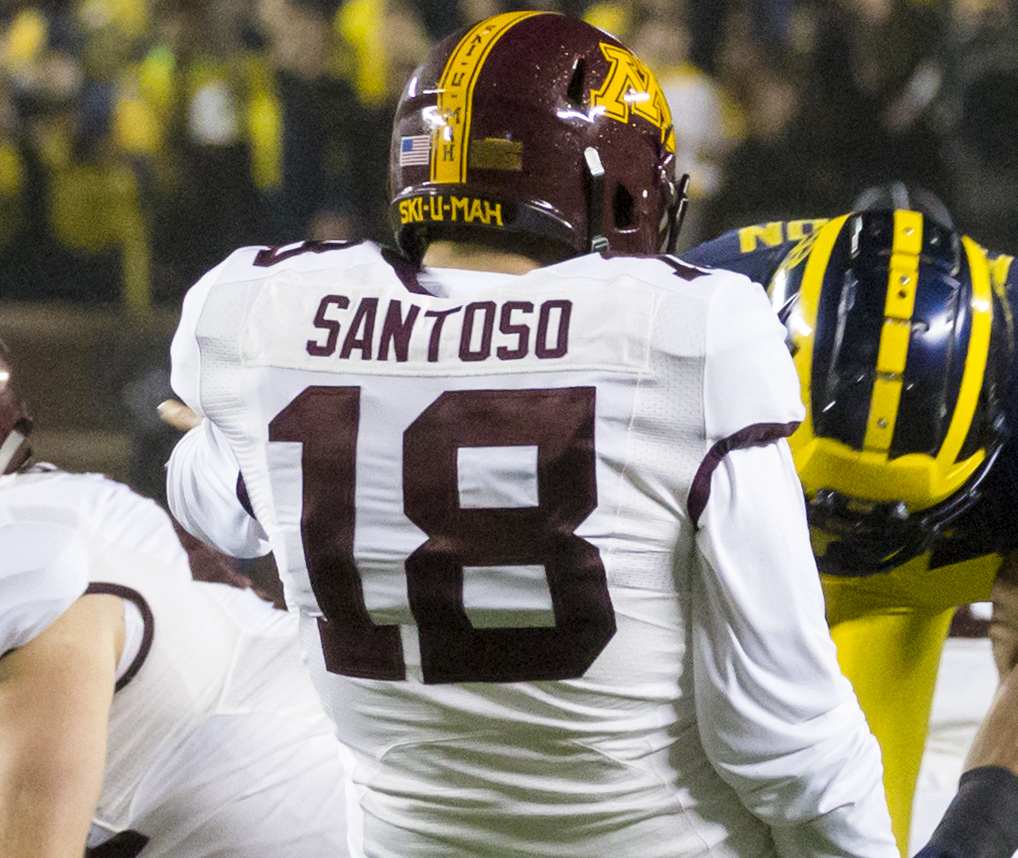
Santoso in 2017

Santoso redshirted during the 2013 season.

Santoso became Minnesota's kicker in 2014 and had a poor 12-of-18 (66.7%) showing on field goal attempts but went 45-of-46 (97.8%) on extra point tries. The high point of his season was 52-yard field goal to beat Purdue.

In 2015, Santoso's field goal numbers improved drastically, he went 17-of-21 (80.9) on field goal attempts, including a game-winning field goal in overtime against Colorado State. Santoso also was a perfect 32-of-32 on extra point attempts.

Prior to the 2016 season, the Gophers announced that Santoso would change positions to punter. In 2016, he punted 77 times for 3,151 yards (40.9 yards/punt).

In 2017, Santoso punted 66 times for 2,838 yards (43.0 yards/punt)

== Professional career ==
=== Detroit Lions (first stint) ===
On April 28, 2018, Santoso signed with the Detroit Lions as an undrafted free agent. He was waived on September 1. Santoso signed a reserve/future contract with the Lions on January 3, 2019.

Santoso was waived during final roster cuts on August 30, 2019.

=== Montreal Alouettes (first stint) ===
The Montreal Alouettes of the CFL signed Santoso to their practice roster on September 24, 2019. He was released on October 15.

=== Tennessee Titans (first stint) ===
Santoso was signed back into the NFL by the Tennessee Titans on November 27, 2019. He was waived on December 17.

=== Montreal Alouettes (second stint) ===
On February 13, 2020, Santoso was re-signed by the Montreal Alouettes. He was released on August 18, after the 2020 CFL season was cancelled.

=== New York Giants (first stint) ===
On September 6, 2020, Santoso was signed to the New York Giants practice squad. He was promoted to the active roster on November 17. He was waived on December 1, but was re-signed to the practice squad two days later. Santoso was elevated to the active roster on January 2, 2021, for the regular season finale against the Dallas Cowboys, and reverted to the practice squad after the game.

On January 26, 2021, Santoso signed a reserves/futures contract with the Giants.

=== Carolina Panthers ===
On August 26, 2021, Santoso was traded to the Carolina Panthers for a conditional seventh-round pick. During the season opener against the New York Jets, Santoso went 2-for-2 in field goals, and 1-for-2 in extra point attempts. He was waived on September 14.

=== Tennessee Titans (second stint) ===
The Titans signed Santoso to their practice squad on September 17, 2021. He was released three days later.

=== Detroit Lions (second stint) ===
On September 22, 2021, Santoso signed with the Detroit Lions' practice squad. He was promoted to the active roster three days later to replace kicker Austin Seibert, who ended up on the COVID-19 reserve list earlier in the week. In Week 10 against the Pittsburgh Steelers, Santoso missed an extra point, and a game winning field goal in overtime which would have given the Lions their first win of the season, but the game resulted in a tie. He was released on November 16.

=== Los Angeles Rams ===
On December 18, 2021, Santoso was signed to the Los Angeles Rams practice squad. Santoso became a Super Bowl champion when the Rams defeated the Cincinnati Bengals in Super Bowl LVI.

=== Jacksonville Jaguars ===
On March 21, 2022, Santoso signed with the Jacksonville Jaguars. He was waived on August 23.

=== New York Giants (second stint) ===
On August 26, 2022, Santoso signed with the New York Giants. He was waived three days later.

=== San Antonio Brahmas ===
On April 10, 2024, Santoso signed with the San Antonio Brahmas of the United Football League (UFL) as a replacement for the injured Donald De La Haye. Santoso was waived on August 2.
