= 2015 Michigan State Spartans football team =

American college football season

2015 Michigan State Spartans football

Big Ten champion Big Ten East Division co-champion

Big Ten Championship Game, W 16–13 vs. Iowa

Cotton Bowl Classic (CFP Semifinal), L 0–38 vs. Alabama
- Conference: Big Ten Conference
- East Division

Ranking
- Coaches: No. 6
- AP: No. 6
- Record: 12–2 (7–1 Big Ten)
- Head coach: Mark Dantonio (9th season)
- Co-offensive coordinators: Dave Warner (3rd season); Jim Bollman (3rd season)
- Offensive scheme: Multiple
- Co-defensive coordinators: Harlon Barnett (1st season); Mike Tressel (1st season)
- Base defense: 4–3
- Captains: Jack Allen; Shilique Calhoun; Darien Harris
- Home stadium: Spartan Stadium

2015 Big Ten Conference football standings
	Conf.			Overall
Team	W		L	W		L
East Division
No. 6 Michigan State xy$^	7	–	1	12	–	2
No. 4 Ohio State x	7	–	1	12	–	1
No. 12 Michigan	6	–	2	10	–	3
Penn State	4	–	4	7	–	6
Indiana	2	–	6	6	–	7
Rutgers	1	–	7	4	–	8
Maryland	1	–	7	3	–	9
West Division
No. 9 Iowa xy	8	–	0	12	–	2
No. 23 Northwestern	6	–	2	10	–	3
No. 21 Wisconsin	6	–	2	10	–	3
Nebraska	3	–	5	6	–	7
Minnesota	2	–	6	6	–	7
Illinois	2	–	6	5	–	7
Purdue	1	–	7	2	–	10
Championship: Michigan State 16, Iowa 13
^ – College Football Playoff participant; $ – Conference champion; x – Division champion/co-champions; y – Championship game participant; Rankings from AP Poll

The 2015 Michigan State Spartans football team represented Michigan State University in the East Division of the Big Ten Conference during the 2015 NCAA Division I FBS football season. Michigan State played their home games at Spartan Stadium in East Lansing, Michigan and were led by ninth-year head coach Mark Dantonio. They finished the season 12–2, 7–1 in Big Ten play to share the East Division championship with Ohio State. Due to their head-to-head win over Ohio State, they represented the East Division in the Big Ten Championship Game where they defeated West Division champion Iowa to become Big Ten Champions. They finished the season No. 3 in the College Football Playoff rankings and were selected to play in the CFP Semifinals at the Cotton Bowl Classic where they lost to No. 2 Alabama.

The season was one of the most successful in school history. The Spartans defeated in-state rival Michigan in Ann Arbor after a fumbled snap by Wolverine punter Blake O'Neill was picked up by Jalen Watts-Jackson and returned for a touchdown in the final ten seconds to give Michigan State a 27–23 win. The Spartans defeated Ohio State on the road in Columbus, playing without Connor Cook and relying on the arms of backup QBs Damion Terry and Tyler O'Connor. Michael Geiger would make a 41-yard field goal as time expired to give the Spartans a 17–14 win and to win the East Division. Michigan State would win its third Big Ten Championship in six years after defeating Iowa in the Big Ten Championship Game, 16–13. The Spartans were selected to play in the College Football Playoff, where they were shutout by eventual National Champion Alabama, 38–0, finishing with a 12-2 record and achieving their fifth 11-win season in six years.

== Offseason ==
=== 2015 NFL draft ===
Four members of the 2014 Spartan football team were selected in the 2015 NFL draft

Round	Pick#	Team	Player	Position
1	11	Minnesota Vikings	Trae Waynes	Cornerback
4	106	Chicago Bears	Jeremy Langford	Running back
5	156	Miami Dolphins	Tony Lippett	Wide receiver
5	175	Houston Texans	Keith Mumphery	Wide receiver

In addition, five other Spartans were signed as undrafted free agents:

Team	Player	Position
Houston Texans	Kurtis Drummond	Safety
San Francisco 49ers	Marcus Rush	Defensive end
San Francisco 49ers	Mylan Hicks	Cornerback
Philadelphia Eagles	Andrew Gleichert	Tight end
New York Jets	Taiwan Jones	Linebacker

Michigan State remained one of only five teams to have had a player selected in each draft since the AFL/NFL merger.

== Coaching staff ==
Name	Position	Joined staff
Mark Dantonio	Head coach	2007
Harlon Barnett	Assistant head coach / co-defensive coordinator / defensive backs	2007
Dave Warner	Co-offensive coordinator / running backs	2007
Jim Bollman	Co-offensive coordinator / tight ends	2013
Mike Tressel	Co-defensive coordinator / linebackers	2007
Brad Salem	Quarterbacks / recruiting coordinator	2010
Terrence Samuel	Wide receivers	2011
Mark Staten	Offensive line	2007
Ron Burton	Defensive line	2013
Mark Snyder	Linebackers / special teams	2015

== Roster ==
2015 Michigan State Spartans Football
Quarterback: 6 Damion Terry – Sophomore; 7 Tyler O’Connor – Junior; 11 Colar Kuhns – (redshirt) Freshman; 14 Brian Lewerke – Freshman; 16 Tommy Vento – Senior; 18 Connor Cook – Senior; Tailback: 3 LJ Scott – Freshman; 22 Delton Williams – Junior; 24 Gerald Holmes – Sophomore; 28 Madre London – (redshirt) Freshman; 32 Nick Tompkins – Junior; 35 Philip-Michael Williams – Senior; Wide receiver: 5 DeAnthony Arnett – Senior; 12 R.J. Shelton – Junior; 13 Robert Aiello – Sophomore; 15 Brandon Sowards – (redshirt) Freshman; 16 Aaron Burbridge – Senior; 17 Trey Kilgore – Sophomore; 19 AJ Troup – Senior; 21 Davis Lewandowski – Freshman; 22 Paul Andrie – Junior; 25 Darrell Stewart Jr. – Freshman; 26 Austin Wolfe – Sophomore; 33 Frank Epitropoulos – Junior; 34 Brock Makaric – Sophomore; 36 Sinclair Farinholt – Freshman; 84 Felton Davis III – Freshman; 85 MacGarrett Kings Jr. – Senior; 86 Matt Macksood – Junior; 87 Edward Barksdale III – Junior; 88 Monty Madaris – Junior; Tight end: 11 Jamal Lyles – Junior; 80 Dylan Chmura – Sophomore; 81 Matt Sokol – (redshirt) Freshman; 82 Josiah Price – Junior; 83 Paul Lang – Senior; 97 Nathan Conrad – (redshirt) Freshman	Fullback: 37 Trevon Pendleton – Senior; 40 Collin Lucas – Freshman; 47 David Fennell – Junior; Offensive lineman: 51 Kyonta Stallworth – OT – Freshman; 55 Miguel Machado – OL – Junior; 57 Collin Caflisch – OL – Freshman; 58 Devyn Salmon – C – Sophomore; 59 David Beedle – OT – (redshirt) Freshman; 60 Casey Schreiner – OL – (redshirt) Freshman; 61 Cole Chewins – OT – Freshman; 63 Noah Listermann – OT – Freshman; 64 Brandon Clemons – OG – Senior; 66 Jack Allen – C – Senior; 65 Brian Allen – OL – Sophomore; 67 Bryce Wilker – OL – Freshman; 68 Jeremy Schram – OL – (redshirt) Freshman; 70 Tyler Higby – OL – Freshman; 71 Chase Gianacakos – OL – (redshirt) Freshman; 73 Dennis Finley – OL – Sophomore; 74 Jack Conklin – OT – Junior; 75 Benny McGowan – OG – Junior; 76 Donavon Clark – OL – Senior; 77 Nick Padla – OL – (redshirt) Freshman; 79 Kodi Kieler – OL – Junior; Defensive line: 4 Malik McDowell – DL – Sophomore; 8 Lawrence Thomas – DL – Senior; 32 Cassius Peat – DL – Freshman; 41 Gerald Owens – DL – (redshirt) Freshman; 51 Dillon Alexander – DE – (redshirt) Freshman; 56 Enoch Smith Jr. – DL – (redshirt) Freshman; 72 Craig Evans – DT – (redshirt) Freshman; 85 Evan Jones – DE – Junior; 89 Shilique Calhoun – DE – Senior; 91 Robert Bowers – DE – (redshirt) Freshman; 92 Joel Heath – DL – Senior; 93 Damon Knox – DL – Senior; 94 Montez Sweat – DE – (redshirt) Freshman; 97 Justice Alexander – DE – Freshman; 98 Demetrius Cooper – DE – Sophomore; 99 Raequan Williams – DL – Freshman	Linebacker: 5 Andrew Dowell – Freshman; 17 Tyriq Thompson – Freshman; 18 Michael Topolinski – Senior; 23 Chris Frey – Sophomore; 30 Riley Bullough – Junior; 31 T.J. Harrell – (redshirt) Freshman; 33 Jon Reschke – Sophomore; 34 Drake Martinez – Sophomore; 38 Byron Bullough – (redshirt) Freshman; 43 Ed Davis – Senior; 45 Darien Harris – Senior; 48 Kenny Willekes – Freshman; 49 Shane Jones – Sophomore; 50 Sean Harrington – Sophomore; Defensive backs: 2 Darian Hicks – CB – Junior; 6 Kaleel Gaines – CB – Freshman; 7 Demetrious Cox – DB – Junior; 9 Montae Nicholson – S – Sophomore; 10 Matt Morrissey – S – (redshirt) Freshman; 13 Vayante Copeland – CB – (redshirt) Freshman; 14 Chris Laneaux – S – Senior; 15 Tyson Smith – CB – Freshman; 19 Josh Butler – CB – Freshman; 20 Jalen Watts-Jackson – DB – (redshirt) Freshman; 26 RJ Williamson – S – Senior; 27 Khari Willis – S – Freshman; 28 David Dowell – DB – Freshman; 29 Mark Meyers – S – Junior; 35 Nick Krumm – DB – Freshman; 36 Arjen Colquhoun – CB – Senior; 39 Jermaine Edmondson – CB – Junior; 42 Zac Leimbach – S – Junior; 44 Grayson Miller – S – Freshman; Specialists: 4 Michael Geiger – K – Junior; 24 Brett Scanlon – K – Junior; 25 Jake Hartbarger – P – (redshirt) Freshman; 52 Taybor Pepper – SNP – Senior; 99 Kevin Cronin – K – Junior

== Schedule ==
Date	Time	Opponent	Rank	Site	TV	Result	Attendance
September 4	7:00 p.m.	at Western Michigan*	No. 5	Waldo Stadium; Kalamazoo, MI	ESPNU	W 37–24	30,885
September 12	8:00 p.m.	No. 7 Oregon*	No. 5	Spartan Stadium; East Lansing, MI (College GameDay)	ABC	W 31–28	76,526
September 19	Noon	Air Force*	No. 4	Spartan Stadium; East Lansing, MI	ABC	W 35–21	74,211
September 26	Noon	Central Michigan*	No. 2	Spartan Stadium; East Lansing, MI	BTN	W 30–10	75,218
October 3	Noon	Purdue†	No. 2	Spartan Stadium; East Lansing, MI	ESPN2	W 24–21	74,418
October 10	8:00 p.m.	at Rutgers	No. 4	High Point Solutions Stadium; Piscataway, NJ	BTN	W 31–24	50,373
October 17	3:30 p.m.	at No. 12 Michigan	No. 7	Michigan Stadium; Ann Arbor, MI (rivalry) (College GameDay)	ESPN	W 27–23	111,740
October 24	3:30 p.m.	Indiana	No. 7	Spartan Stadium; East Lansing, MI (rivalry)	ABC/ESPN2	W 52–26	74,144
November 7	7:00 p.m.	at Nebraska	No. 7	Memorial Stadium; Lincoln, NE	ESPN	L 38–39	90,094
November 14	Noon	Maryland	No. 13	Spartan Stadium; East Lansing, MI	ESPN2	W 24–7	73,406
November 21	3:30 p.m.	at No. 3 Ohio State	No. 9	Ohio Stadium; Columbus, OH (College GameDay)	ABC	W 17–14	108,975
November 28	3:30 p.m.	Penn State	No. 5	Spartan Stadium; East Lansing, MI (rivalry)	ESPN	W 55–16	74,705
December 5	8:15 p.m.	vs. No. 4 Iowa	No. 5	Lucas Oil Stadium; Indianapolis, IN (Big Ten Championship Game) (College GameDay)	FOX	W 16–13	66,985
December 31	8:00 p.m.	vs. No. 2 Alabama	No. 3	AT&T Stadium; Arlington, Texas (Cotton Bowl Classic–CFP Semifinal / SEC Nation)	ESPN	L 0–38	82,812
*Non-conference game; Rankings from AP Poll and CFP Rankings after November 3 released prior to game; All times are in Eastern time

== Game summaries ==
=== At Western Michigan ===
Michigan State at Western Michigan

Team	1	2	3	4	Total
• No. 5 Spartans	20	7	7	3	37
Broncos	7	3	7	7	24

- Date: September 4th
- Location:
  Waldo Stadium
  Kalamazoo, MI
- Game start: 7:07 p.m.
- Elapsed time: 3:36
- Game attendance: 30,885
- Game weather: 78 °F (26 °C), wind 8 mph (13 km/h) NW, sunny and humid
- Referee: Jerry McGinn
- TV announcers (ESPNU):
  Allen Bestwick (play-by-play)
  Dan Hawkins (analyst)
  Paul Carcaterra (sideline)

Scoring summary
1	09:09	MSU	Madre London 4 yd run (Michael Geiger kick)	MSU 7–0
1	08:56	WMU	Darius Phillips kickoff return for 100 yds (Andrew Haldeman kick)	TIE 7–7
1	05:07	MSU	Madre London 7 yd run (failed 2-pt conversion)	MSU 13–7
1	06:26	MSU	Josiah Price 9 yd pass from Connor Cook (Michael Geiger kick)	MSU 20–7
2	08:00	MSU	Gerald Holmes 8 yd run (Michael Geiger kick)	MSU 27–7
2	02:46	WMU	Andrew Haldeman 22 yd field goal	MSU 27–10
3	09:35	MSU	DeAnthony Arnett 21 yd pass from Connor Cook (Michael Geiger kick)	MSU 34–10
3	01:37	WMU	Corey Davis 17 yd pass from Zach Terrell (Andrew Haldeman kick)	MSU 34–17
4	11:09	WMU	Jeremiah Mullinax 29 yd pass from Zach Terrell (Andrew Haldeman kick)	MSU 34–24
4	07:55	MSU	Michael Geiger 21 yd field goal	MSU 37–24

Statistics	MSU	WMU
First downs	26	22
Total yards	452	383
Rushing yards	196	18
Passing yards	256	365
Turnovers	1	2
Time of possession	28:19	31:41

Team	Category	Player	Statistics
Michigan State	Passing	Connor Cook	15/31, 256 yards, 2 TD
Michigan State	Rushing	L. J. Scott	13 rushes, 77 yards
Michigan State	Receiving	Aaron Burbridge	4 receptions, 117 yards
Western Michigan	Passing	Zach Terrell	33/50, 365 yards, 2 TD, 2 INT
Western Michigan	Rushing	Jarvion Franklin	8 rushes, 23 yards
Western Michigan	Receiving	Corey Davis	10 receptions, 154 yards, TD

The Spartans began the 2015 campaign with a rare road game against MAC foe Western Michigan. The last time MSU and Western played, the Spartans required a couple of defensive touchdowns to put the Broncos away in the home opener of the 2013 season, a year in which they won the Big Ten outright and won the Rose Bowl.

After Montae Nicholson intercepted a Zach Terrell pass in Western territory, giving the Spartans excellent field position, the Spartans scored first on a 24-yard Madre London touchdown run. Western Michigan return man and cornerback Darius Phillips returned the ensuing kickoff for a touchdown to tie things up. After another Madre London touchdown run, the Spartans took a 13–7 lead after a failed two-point conversion. Michigan State scored another touchdown on their next possession as Connor Cook found Josiah Price on a nine-yard pass to swell the Spartans' lead to 20–7. Both teams scored in the second quarter, with Michigan State taking a 27–10 lead into halftime.

The Spartans put the nail in the coffin on the opening drive of the second half after a 21-yard pass from Connor Cook to DeAnthony Arnett gave MSU a 24-point lead. Western scored two late touchdowns, but a Vayante Copeland interception in the end zone late in the game put an end to the Broncos' comeback attempt.

Michigan State won, 37–24, winning their seventh straight season opener, improving their record against Western Michigan to 12–2 and their overall record against the Michigan directional colleges to 28–5. The Spartans moved to 1–0 on the season.

=== No. 7 Oregon ===
Oregon at Michigan State

Team	1	2	3	4	Total
No. 7 Ducks	7	0	7	14	28
• No. 5 Spartans	7	7	10	7	31

- Date: September 12th
- Location:
  Spartan Stadium
  East Lansing, MI
- Game start: 8:12 p.m.
- Elapsed time: 3:29
- Game attendance: 76,526
- Game weather: 56 °F (13 °C), wind 4 mph (6.4 km/h) SE, partly cloudy
- Referee: Michael Batlan
- TV announcers (ABC):
  Rece Davis (play-by-play)
  Kirk Herbstreit (analyst)
  Heather Cox (sideline)

Scoring summary
1	11:10	ORE	Royce Freeman 2 yd run (Aidan Schneider Kick)	ORE 7–0
1	10:02	MSU	Josiah Price 12 yd pass from Connor Cook (Michael Geiger Kick)	TIE 7–7
2	13:45	MSU	Aaron Burbridge 17 yd pass from Connor Cook (Michael Geiger Kick)	MSU 14–7
3	13:11	ORE	Bralon Addison 81 yd punt return (Aidan Schneider Kick)	TIE 14–14
3	08:11	MSU	LJ Scott 6 yd run (Michael Geiger Kick)	MSU 21–14
3	01:08	MSU	Michael Geiger 36 yd field goal	MSU 24–14
4	12:20	ORE	Vernon Adams 2 yd run (Aidan Schneider kick)	MSU 24–21
4	10:51	MSU	LJ Scott 36 yd run (Michael Geiger kick)	MSU 31–21
4	03:25	ORE	Royce Freeman 15 yd pass from Vernon Adams	MSU 31–28

Statistics	ORE	MSU
First downs	26	21
Total yards	432	389
Rushing yards	123	197
Passing yards	309	192
Turnovers	2	1
Time of possession	26:34	33:26

Team	Category	Player	Statistics
Oregon	Passing	Vernon Adams	22/39, 309 yards, TD, 2 INT
Oregon	Rushing	Royce Freeman	24 rushes, 92 yards, TD
Oregon	Receiving	Bralon Addison	7 receptions, 138 yards
Michigan State	Passing	Connor Cook	20/32, 192 yards, 2 TD, INT
Michigan State	Rushing	Madre London	18 rushes, 103 yards
Michigan State	Receiving	Aaron Burbridge	8 receptions, 101 yards, TD

Following their defeat of Western Michigan in the season opener, the Spartans played host to the Oregon Ducks. This was the first Spartan home game featuring two top-10-ranked teams since the 1966 Notre Dame–Michigan State game. This was also a rematch from the year before, where the game was played at Oregon. In that game, despite having a 27–18 lead late in the third quarter, Michigan State fell to the Ducks, 46–27, thanks to the effort of Ducks QB and eventual Heisman Trophy winner Marcus Mariota. Oregon fell to Ohio State in the National Championship game, making Michigan State's only two losses that season come by the hands of the two teams who played for the national championship.

The Ducks struck first after a 13-play, 75-yard drive that culminated with a two-yard Royce Freeman touchdown run. The Spartans answered immediately, as Josiah Price caught a 12-yard pass from Connor Cook, following a 62-yard run from Madre London, to tie the game at 7 apiece. The offenses cooled off after what was looking like the beginning of a shootout. Both offenses traded punts, with Oregon's punter Ian Wheeler giving Michigan State great field position after a shanked 25-yard punt. However, Michigan State were unable to capitalize off of this blunder as Michael Geiger missed a 28-yard field goal. Despite that, Ducks QB Vernon Adams threw an interception two plays later to Montae Nicholson. Six plays later, Connor Cook found Aaron Burbridge over the middle, with Burbridge breaking several tackles on his way to the end zone for a 17-yard catch and run touchdown. Michigan State held a 14–7 lead early in the second quarter. On the ensuing Duck possession, Oregon drove to the Spartan one-yard line before the Michigan State defense made a goal-line stand on both third and fourth down, causing the Ducks to turn the ball over on downs. Neither team scored the remainder of the half, with Vernon Adams and Connor Cook both throwing interceptions. Michigan State took a 14–7 lead into halftime.

The beginning of the second half did not start well for the Spartans, as Oregon WR Bralon Addison returned a punt 81 yards for a touchdown to tie the game at 14. The Spartans answered with an 11-play, 75-yard drive ending with an LJ Scott six-yard touchdown run, again giving the Spartans the lead, 21–14. Several drives later, Michael Geiger made a 36-yard field goal, increasing the lead to 24–14. Oregon had possession of the ball to start the fourth quarter and drove the ball down the field, with Vernon Adams scoring a touchdown on a two-yard run, pulling the Ducks within three points. Michigan State responded quickly with a touchdown of their own after an LJ Scott 36-yard touchdown run, giving the Spartans a 10-point lead, 31–21. The two teams traded possessions until Oregon scored after a 15-yard pass to Royce Freeman brought the Ducks within three again with 3:25 remaining in the game. The Ducks got the ball back after a quick Michigan State possession. Oregon had two minutes to either tie or take the lead. The drive started off well for Oregon, with Royce Freeman ripping off runs of 11 yards and 4 yards, and getting the ball down to the Spartan 33-yard line. However, Vernon Adams overthrew a wide-open Byron Marshall on the following play, which would have given the Ducks the lead late. The Spartans blitzed on third down, with Chris Frey and Lawrence Thomas sacking Adams for a loss of 10. Adams underthrew his receiver on fourth and long and the Spartans took over on downs and ran out the clock, ensuring a 31–28 victory.

Michigan State's 31–28 win over Oregon gave the Spartans a 13–5–1 record in match-ups between two schools ranked in the top 10 of the Associated Press poll. The Spartans moved to 2–0 on the season.

=== Air Force ===
Air Force at Michigan State

Team	1	2	3	4	Total
Falcons	7	0	7	7	21
• No. 4 Spartans	14	14	7	0	35

- Date: September 19th
- Location:
  Spartan Stadium
  East Lansing, MI
- Game start: 12:05 p.m.
- Elapsed time: 3:16
- Game attendance: 74,211
- Game weather: 62 °F (17 °C), Wind 14 mph (23 km/h) NW, Overcast
- Referee: Alan Eck
- TV announcers (ABC):
  Dave Pasch (Play-by-Play)
  Brian Griese (Analyst)
  Tom Luginbill (Sideline)

Scoring summary
1	08:48	MSU	Josiah Price 15 yd pass from Connor Cook (Michael Geiger kick)	MSU 7–0
1	06:31	MSU	RJ Williamson 64 yd fumble return (Michael Geiger kick)	MSU 14–0
1	01:22	AF	Benton Washington 1 yd run (Drew Oehrle kick)	MSU 14–7
2	10:40	MSU	Aaron Burbridge 28 yd pass from Connor Cook (Michael Geiger kick)	MSU 21–7
2	00:28	MSU	Aaron Burbridge 32 yd pass from Connor Cook (Michael Geiger kick)	MSU 28–7
3	11:07	MSU	Aaron Burbridge 21 yd pass from Connor Cook (Michael Geiger kick)	MSU 35–7
3	08:38	AF	Jalen Robinette 38 yd pass from Karson Roberts (Drew Oehrle kick)	MSU 35–14
4	02:11	AF	DJ Johnson 2 yd run (Drew Oehrle kick)	MSU 35–21

Statistics	AFA	MSU
First downs	24	22
Total yards	428	324
Rushing yards	279	77
Passing yards	149	247
Turnovers	3	0
Time of possession	26:59	33:01

Team	Category	Player	Statistics
Air Force	Passing	Karson Roberts	6/9, 149 yards, TD, INT
Air Force	Rushing	Jacobi Owens	14 rushes, 72 yards
Air Force	Receiving	Jalen Rowell	2 receptions, 82 yards, TD
Michigan State	Passing	Connor Cook	15/23, 247 yards, 4 TD
Michigan State	Rushing	Madre London	17 rushes, 40 yards
Michigan State	Receiving	Aaron Burbridge	8 receptions, 156 yards, 3 TD

After the victory over Oregon, the Spartans hosted the Air Force Academy in the schools' first-ever meeting on the gridiron.

The Spartans scored on their first possession of the game after a 15-yard pass from Connor Cook to Josiah Price put MSU up 7–0, ending a 9-play, 59-yard drive. The following possession saw Air Force drive down to the MSU 39 yard line before Falcon tailback DJ Johnson fumbled the ball. RJ Williamson scooped up the fumble and returned it 64 yards for a touchdown, giving Michigan State a 14–0 lead as the rout appeared to be on its way. Air Force would make up for this error on their next possession, after a Benton Washington 1-yard touchdown run pulled Air Force within 7, putting the score at 14–7 Michigan State at the end of the first quarter. Michigan State dominated the second quarter on both sides of the ball. On the opening possession of the quarter, Michigan State went 87 yards in 10 plays, a drive capped off by a spectacular catch by Aaron Burbridge on a 28-yard pass from Cook. Burbridge would catch another pass from Cook for a touchdown in the final 30 seconds of the half, this time from 32 yards to give the Spartans a 28–7 lead at halftime. The Spartan defense played extremely well in the second quarter, only allowing Air Force to gain 19 yards of offense in the entire quarter.

Michigan State scored again on the opening possession of the second half, as Cook would find Aaron Burbridge for a third time on a 21-yard pass and catch in the endzone, giving MSU a commanding 28 point lead. Air Force would cut the lead to 21 on the ensuing drive after a 38-yard pass from Karson Roberts to Jalen Robinette resulted in a touchdown. Despite Michigan State's offense stalling after their opening possession of the half, the Falcons were unable to get back into the game due turnover issues, committing two turnovers in Spartan territory. Air Force would add a DJ Johnson 2-yard touchdown run with 2:11 remaining in the game to cut the lead to 35–21, but at that point it was too late. The Spartans kneeled out the clock for the victory.

Aaron Burbridge had a career day, catching eight passes for 156 yards and three touchdowns. The last Spartan receiver to catch three touchdown passes in a single game was B.J. Cunningham against Wisconsin during the 2011 season. Connor Cook threw four touchdown passes in a game for the second time in his career. He first accomplished this feat during his first start as a sophomore against Youngstown State. He also earned his 26th career victory as starting QB, overtaking Stanford's Kevin Hogan as college football's active wins leader.

The Spartans moved to 3–0 on the season.

=== Central Michigan ===
Central Michigan at Michigan State

Team	1	2	3	4	Total
Chippewas	0	7	3	0	10
• No. 2 Spartans	7	10	0	13	30

- Date: September 26th
- Location:
  Spartan Stadium
  East Lansing, MI
- Game start: 12:01 p.m.
- Elapsed time: 3:06
- Game attendance: 75,218
- Game weather: 71 °F (22 °C), Wind 9 mph (14 km/h) ESE, Partly Cloudy
- Referee: Greg Blum
- TV announcers (BTN):
  Eric Collins (Play-by-Play)
  Glen Mason (Analyst)
  Rick Pizzo (Sideline)

Scoring summary
1	08:56	MSU	Madre London 6 yd run (Michael Geiger kick)	MSU 7–0
2	11:20	MSU	Michael Geiger 47 yd field gold	MSU 10–0
2	05:13	MSU	Josiah Price 5 yd pass from Connor Cook (Michael Geiger kick)	MSU 17–0
2	00:08	CMU	Anthony Rice 1 yd pass from Cooper Rush (Brian Eavey kick)	MSU 17–7
3	06:24	CMU	Brian Eavey 42 yd kick	MSU 17–10
4	08:37	MSU	Gerald Holmes 3 yd run (Michael Geiger kick)	MSU 24–10
4	03:21	MSU	Gerald Holmes 6 yd run (Michael Geiger PAT blocked)	MSU 30–10

Statistics	CMU	MSU
First downs	17	18
Total yards	340	324
Rushing yards	55	181
Passing yards	285	143
Turnovers	1	0
Time of possession	31:45	28:15

Team	Category	Player	Statistics
Central Michigan	Passing	Cooper Rush	26/39, 285 yards, TD
Central Michigan	Rushing	Devon Spalding	15 rushes, 77 yards
Central Michigan	Receiving	Jesse Kroll	6 receptions, 86 yards
Michigan State	Passing	Connor Cook	11/19, 143 yards, TD
Michigan State	Rushing	Madre London	15 rushes, 73 yards, TD
Michigan State	Receiving	MacGarrett Kings Jr.	2 receptions, 46 yards

Following their win over Air Force, Michigan State would host Central Michigan. The two teams last met in 2012, a game which the then 11th ranked Spartans won 41–7.

Central drove to the MSU 28-yard line on the opening drive of the game before attempting a 45-yard field goal attempt which would be blocked by Demetrius Cooper. Michigan State scored on a six play, 72-yard drive capped off by a Madre London six-yard touchdown run. Central followed with a 15-play, 54-yard drive that took 8:27 off the clock, only to have a 43-yard field goal attempt blocked again, this time by Shilique Calhoun. Michael Geiger added a 47-yard field goal to the Michigan State lead in the second quarter. Josiah Price added a 5-yard touchdown reception from Connor Cook to give Michigan State a 17–0 lead. Central scored a touchdown on a one-yard pass from Cooper Rush to Anthony Rice just before halftime to cut the lead to 10. Michigan State led 17–7 at halftime.

Central pulled within seven after a successful 47*yard Brian Eavey field goal on their first possession of the half. Neither team was able to put anything together offensively for the rest of the quarter. Heading into the fourth quarter, Michigan State still led 17–10. Michigan State added two late touchdowns, both by Gerald Holmes on runs of three and six yards (after a Central Michigan fumble in MSU territory) respectively to give Michigan State the 30–10 victory. However, the loss was costly as offensive lineman Jack Conklin left the game with a leg injury. With earlier season-ending injuries to linebacker Ed Davis and cornerback Vayante Copeland, the teams injuries began to mount.

Michigan State improved its record against the Michigan directional colleges to 29–5 with the victory. The Spartans moved to 4–0 on the season.

=== Purdue ===
Purdue at Michigan State

Team	1	2	3	4	Total
Boilermakers	0	0	7	14	21
• No. 2 Spartans	14	7	0	3	24

- Date: October 3rd
- Location:
  Spartan Stadium
  East Lansing, MI
- Game start: 12:01
- Elapsed time: 3:08
- Game attendance: 74,418
- Game weather: 49 °F (9 °C), Wind 16 mph (26 km/h) ENE, Rain
- Referee: J Servinski
- TV announcers (ESPN2):
  Beth Mowins (Play-by-Play)
  Anthony Becht (Analyst)
  Paul Carcaterra (Sideline)

Scoring summary
1	07:11	MSU	LJ Scott 18 yd run (Michael Geiger kick)	MSU 7–0
1	0:28	MSU	LJ Scott 1 yd run (Michael Geiger kick)	MSU 14–0
2	11:39	MSU	R.J. Shelton 23 yd pass from Connor Cook (Michael Geiger kick)	MSU 21–0
3	05:30	PUR	Gregory Phillips 2 yd pass from David Blough (Paul Griggs kick)	MSU 21–7
4	14:10	PUR	Markell Jones 68 yd run (Paul Griggs kick)	MSU 21–14
4	09:54	MSU	Michael Geiger 30 yd field goal	MSU 24–14
4	06:44	PUR	Markell Jones 3 yd run (Paul Griggs kick)	MSU 24–21

Statistics	PUR	MSU
First downs	16	20
Total yards	301	406
Rushing yards	165	267
Passing yards	136	139
Turnovers	3	0
Time of possession	22:36	37:24

Team	Category	Player	Statistics
Purdue	Passing	David Blough	15/31, 136 yards, TD, INT
Purdue	Rushing	Markell Jones	22 rushes, 157 yards, 2 TD
Purdue	Receiving	DeAngelo Yancey	4 receptions, 68 yards
Michigan State	Passing	Connor Cook	13/19, 139 yards, TD
Michigan State	Rushing	L. J. Scott	18 rushes, 146 yards, 2 TD
Michigan State	Receiving	Monty Madaris	2 receptions, 47 yards

In their first game of the Big Ten season, MSU hosted Purdue for their fourth straight home game to start the season and as the newly ranked No. 2 team in the country. MSU jumped out to an early 21–0 lead on Purdue in the first 17 minutes of the game and the game appeared to be over. The Spartans were led by two touchdown runs by LJ Scott and looked to be on their way to another rout. Near the end of the first half, Jack Conklin's replacement was forced to leave the game with an apparent knee injury. At halftime, the school celebrated the 50th anniversary of the 1965 national championship team. However, as the second half began, the rain began to fall. MSU's first three possessions of the second half ended with two punts and a turnover as Purdue narrowed the lead to 21–14 early in the third quarter. A 30-yard MSU field preceded another Purdue touchdown to draw the game even closer, 24–21. A punt by MSU led to Purdue having an opportunity to tie or take the lead, but MSU's defense stiffened in time.

The win moved Cook into first place in career wins at Michigan State with 28. The Spartans moved to 5–0 on the season.

=== At Rutgers ===
Michigan State at Rutgers

Team	1	2	3	4	Total
• No. 4 Spartans	7	3	14	7	31
Scarlet Knights	0	14	7	3	24

- Date: October 10th
- Location:
  High Point Solutions Stadium
  Piscataway, NJ
- Game start: 8:13 p.m.
- Elapsed time: 3:17
- Game attendance: 50,373
- Game weather: 54 °F (12 °C), Wind 2 mph (3.2 km/h) S, Clear
- Referee: Mike Cannon
- TV announcers (BTN):
  Cory Provus (Play-by-Play)
  Chuck Long (Analyst)
  J Leman (Sideline)

Scoring summary
1	01:46	MSU	Macgarrett Kings 8 yd pass from Connor Cook (Michael Geiger kick)	MSU 7–0
2	14:56	RUT	Leonte Carroo 5 yd pass from Chris Laviano (Kyle Federico kick)	TIE 7–7
2	13:11	RUT	Leonte Carroo 39 pass from Chris Laviano (Kyle Federico kick)	RUT 14–7
2	09:14	MSU	Michael Geiger 30 yd field goal	RUT 14–10
3	09:01	MSU	LJ Scott 1 yd run (Michael Geiger kick)	MSU 17–14
3	05:46	MSU	DeAnthony Arnett 25 yd pass from Connor Cook (Michael Geiger kick)	MSU 24–14
3	00:49	RUT	Leonte Carroo 28 yd pass from Chris Laviano (Kyle Federico kick)	MSU 24–21
4	04:21	RUT	Kyle Federico 22 yd field goal	TIE 24–24
4	00:43	MSU	LJ Scott 3 yd run (Michael Geiger kick)	MSU 31–24

Statistics	MSU	RUTG
First downs	22	15
Total yards	489	349
Rushing yards	122	141
Passing yards	367	208
Turnovers	1	0
Time of possession	34:12	25:48

Team	Category	Player	Statistics
Michigan State	Passing	Connor Cook	24/39, 367 yards, 2 TD, INT
Michigan State	Rushing	L. J. Scott	9 rushes, 42 yards, TD
Michigan State	Receiving	Aaron Burbridge	10 receptions, 156 yards
Rutgers	Passing	Chris Laviano	15/24, 208 yards, 3 TD
Rutgers	Rushing	Paul James	2 rushes, 74 yards
Rutgers	Receiving	Leonte Carroo	7 receptions, 134 yards, 3 TD

A week after staving off a furious Purdue comeback attempt, the Spartans went on the road for the first time all season to Piscataway, New Jersey to face Rutgers, a program in their second year of Big Ten membership, and a team the Spartans dominated the year prior, 45–3. Prior to the game Rutgers's star wide receiver, Leonte Carroo, was reinstated to the team after serving a two-game suspension.

Neither offense got any sort of momentum going for a majority of the first quarter. Michigan State received great field position after a bad Rutgers punt of 19 yards. The Spartans moved the ball down to the Rutgers 18 yard line, but a Michael Geiger field goal attempt of 35 yards was blocked. After trading possessions, Michigan State finally put a sustained drive together, which included a fourth and 10 conversion after a 25-yard pass from Connor Cook to Aaron Burbridge. The drive concluded on an eight-yard pass from Connor Cook to Macgarrett Kings which resulted in the game's first touchdown with 1:46 remaining in the quarter. Michigan State led 7–0 at the end of one.

Rutgers responded quickly, scoring on a 4 play, 78 yard drive to tie the game at seven after a Chris Laviano pass to Leonte Carroo for five yards. Later after a shanked Jake Hartbarger punt, Rutgers received great field position on their next possession, and only needed two plays to take a 14–7 lead on a Leonte Carroo 39 yard touchdown reception. Michigan State pulled within four point on their next possession after a successful Michael Geiger 30-yard field goal try. The Spartans had the opportunity to take the lead before halftime, driving the ball all the way to the Rutgers eight yard line, but Connor Cook threw an interception in the back of the endzone with a little over a minute left in the half. It was only his second interception of the season. Rutgers led 14–10 at the half.

The Michigan State offense came out on fire in the second half, scoring touchdowns on their first two possessions of the half; the first score coming off of a LJ Scott one yard touchdown run and the second the result of a DeAnthony Arnett 25-yard touchdown reception. Michigan State held a 24–14 lead midway through the third quarter and seemed to have the game in hand. However, Rutgers scored late in the third quarter with 49 seconds remaining on a Chris Laviano 28-yard touchdown pass to Leonte Carroo. Michigan State led 24–21 lead going into the fourth quarter.

After a stalled possession, Jake Hartbarger pinned Rutgers down at their own five yard line. Rutgers went on a time-consuming, 16 play, 91 yard drive that took eight minutes off the clock, with Kyle Federico making a 22-yard field goal attempt to tie the game at 24. Michigan State received the ball with 4:08 remaining in the game. On third and nine, Cook completed a 29-yard pass to R.J. Shelton. LJ Scott had runs of six and two yards respectively on the following plays. On third and two, Aaron Burbridge received the ball on a reverse and ran for 10 yards to the Rutgers 28 yard line. LJ Scott moved the ball to the Rutgers three yard line after a 16-yard run. One play later he would score, giving Michigan State a 31–24 lead with 43 seconds remaining. Rutgers received the ball at their own 35 yard line. On third and 10 Chris Laviano completed a 25-yard pass to Andre Patton, moving the ball into Michigan State territory at the 40-yard line. Several plays later on third down, Malik McDowell sacked Laviano for a loss of 10. Rutgers, having no timeouts left and the clock running, only had time for one play, presumably a Hail Mary pass. On fourth down however, Laviano, unaware of what down it was, took the snap and spiked the ball to stop the clock turning the ball over to Michigan State on downs. Michigan State kneeled out the clock, giving them another close game, with a 31–24 victory.

The Spartans moved to 6–0 on the season.

=== At No. 12 Michigan ===
Michigan State at Michigan
(Paul Bunyan Trophy)

Team	1	2	3	4	Total
• No. 7 Spartans	0	7	7	13	27
No. 12 Wolverines	0	10	10	3	23

- Date: October 17th
- Location:
  Michigan Stadium
  Ann Arbor, MI
- Game start: 3:35 p.m.
- Elapsed time: 3:46
- Game attendance: 111,740
- Game weather: About 45 °F (7 °C), Wind 12–14 mph (19–23 km/h) NW, Mostly cloudy
- Referee: John O'Neill
- TV announcers (ESPN):
  Sean McDonough (Play-by-Play)
  Chris Spielman (Analyst)
  Todd McShay (Sideline)

Scoring summary
2	13:13	UM	Sione Houma 2 yd run (Kenny Allen kick)	UM 7–0
2	07:06	MSU	LJ Scott 11 yd run (Michael Geiger kick)	TIE 7–7
2	05:34	UM	Kenny Allen 38 yd field goal	UM 10–7
3	09:17	UM	Sione Houma 1 yd run (Kenny Allen kick)	UM 17–7
3	07:07	MSU	Macgarrett Kings 30 yd pass from Connor Cook (Michael Geiger kick)	UM 17–14
3	02:06	UM	Kenny Allen 21 yd field goal	UM 20–14
4	09:25	UM	Kenny Allen 38 yd field goal	UM 23–14
4	08:56	MSU	LJ Scott 1 yd run (Michael Geiger kick)	UM 23–21
4	00:00	MSU	Jalen Watts-Jackson 38 yd fumble return	MSU 27–23

Statistics	MSU	MICH
First downs	20	10
Total yards	386	230
Rushing yards	58	62
Passing yards	328	168
Turnovers	0	1
Time of possession	30:11	29:49

Team	Category	Player	Statistics
Michigan State	Passing	Connor Cook	18/39, 328 yards, TD
Michigan State	Rushing	Gerald Holmes	8 rushes, 33 yards
Michigan State	Receiving	Aaron Burbridge	9 receptions, 132 yards
Michigan	Passing	Jake Rudock	15/25, 168 yards
Michigan	Rushing	De'Veon Smith	19 rushes, 46 yards
Michigan	Receiving	Jehu Chesson	4 receptions, 58 yards

Following a closer than expected string of wins, the Spartans, ranked No. 7 in the country, faced in-state rival Michigan, ranked No. 12 in the country. The game was played in Ann Arbor, Michigan for the first time since 2012 which also marked the last time MSU lost to Michigan. Coming into this contest, the Spartans had defeated the Wolverines six of the last seven times the two teams have played. Despite Michigan State being ranked higher than Michigan, Michigan was favored by 6 1/2 points, with the program seeing something of a rejuvenation under head coach Jim Harbaugh. Michigan also came into the game touting the No. 2 total defense in the nation, and were riding a three-game shutout streak, with shutout victories over BYU, Maryland, and Northwestern.

The first quarter was a defensive struggle, as both the Spartan and Wolverine defenses stood tall. Michigan State was able to move the ball effectively near the end of the quarter, driving all the way down to the Michigan 28 yard line, but turned the ball over on downs following a failed fourth down conversion attempt. Michigan took a 7–0 lead during the opening minutes of the second quarter on a Sione Houma two-yard touchdown run, capping off an eight play, 72-yard drive. Several drives later during a Spartan possession, Michigan senior linebacker and team captain Joe Bolden was penalized for targeting during a Connor Cook run of six yards. The call was affirmed by replay and Bolden was ejected for the remainder of the game. Two plays later, LJ Scott scored on an 11-yard scamper to tie the game at seven apiece, snapping Michigan's aforementioned three game shutout streak. Michigan took back the lead on the ensuing possession after a Kenny Allen 38-yard field goal gave them a 10–7 lead going into halftime.

Michigan scored on the opening possession of the second half after several goal line attempts from the Michigan State one yard line where the officials could not determine whether Sione Houma broke the plane of the goalline. It took the officials several seconds on the final attempt to blow the play dead and determine that Houma did in fact score, giving Michigan a 17–7 lead. Michigan State scored less than three minutes later after Macgarrett Kings caught a 30-yard pass from Connor Cook to pull the Spartans within three. Michigan added to its lead with a Kenny Allen 21-yard field goal. At the beginning of the fourth quarter, MSU failed to convert on fourth down for the second time after Macgarrett Kings dropped a pass that would have given the Spartans a first down. The Wolverines added another field goal to their lead a few possessions later, expanding the score to 23–14. Michigan State responded immediately on a drive that only took 29 seconds off the clock, as Connor Cook found a wide open Trevon Pendleton, who caught the ball and ran all the way to the Michigan one-yard line. The play was originally called a touchdown, however after review, it was deemed Pendleton was down at the one. LJ Scott ran the ball in for the score a play later, pulling MSU within two points. The pass from Cook to Pendleton was the longest offensive play all year for the Spartans (74 yards), and was Pendleton's first catch all season. The last reception he had was against Purdue for 2 yards the previous season.

Both defenses dominated during the final nine minutes of the game, as both offenses struggled to move the ball. With less than five minutes remaining in the game, Michigan State received the ball at their own 28-yard line. After an offsides penalty was called against Michigan, Cook was sacked by Willie Henry for a loss of 10. Cook found Aaron Burbridge for 25 yards for the first down. Several plays later, after MSU had advanced the ball into Michigan territory, Henry sacked Cook again on first down for a loss of 9 yards. Several plays later, facing a fourth and 19 with less than two minutes left on the clock, Cook was forced to throw an errant pass due to pressure from Michigan's d-line, failing to convert on fourth down for a third time. Michigan received the ball on downs and forced MSU to use their final timeout with 1:42 remaining in the game. On third and three, the Spartan defense stopped Michigan, preventing them from running out the clock with a first down. What followed was perhaps one of the most bizarre and unlikely endings to a football game. Facing a fourth and two, Michigan lined up to punt the ball with 10 seconds left on the game clock. Punter Blake O'Neill earlier had booted an 80-yard punt and had played well all game. However, after receiving a low snap O'Neill bobbled the football, allowing Michigan State to recover it. Jalen Watts-Jackson returned the ball 38 yards into the end zone to give Michigan State the win, 27–23.

With Michigan State's College Football Playoff hopes remaining intact, the Spartans improved their record to 7–0 for the first time since the 2010 season. For just the fourth time in the past 46 games, the team with the fewest rushing yards came out with a victory. Michigan rushed for 62 yards, while MSU ran for 58 yards. MSU Coach Mark Dantonio not only improved his record against Michigan to 7–2, but also earned his 100th career coaching victory. Michigan State outgained Michigan 386–230, and also had 20 first downs to Michigan's 10. Connor Cook threw for 328 yards and a touchdown, while Aaron Burbridge caught 9 passes for 132 yards, his fifth 100 yard receiving game on the season. Defensively, Shilique Calhoun recorded two sacks and was named Big Ten Defensive Player of the Week. The hero for the Spartans, Jalen Watts-Jackson, injured his hip on the game-winning play and required season ending surgery afterwards. The injury was not deemed career threatening.

=== Indiana ===
Indiana at Michigan State
(Old Brass Spittoon)

Team	1	2	3	4	Total
Hoosiers	7	13	6	0	26
• No. 7 Spartans	7	14	7	24	52

- Date: October 24th
- Location:
  Spartan Stadium
  East Lansing, MI
- Game start: 3:36 p.m.
- Elapsed time: 3:42
- Game attendance: 74,144
- Game weather: 68 °F (20 °C), Wind 16 mph (26 km/h) SW, Overcast
- Referee: Todd Geerlings
- TV announcers (ABC/ESPN2):
  Mike Patrick (Play-by-Play)
  Ed Cunningham (Analyst)
  Laura Rutledge (Sideline)

Scoring summary
1	09:12	IND	Jordan Howard 5 yd run (Griffin Oakes kick)	IND 7–0
1	05:56	MSU	R.J. Shelton 22 yd pass from Connor Cook (Michael Geiger kick)	TIE 7–7
2	14:56	MSU	Delton Williams 1 yd run (Michael Geiger kick)	MSU 14–7
2	08:19	IND	Ricky Jones 11 yd pass from Nate Sudfeld (Griffin Oakes PAT failed)	MSU 14–13
2	01:37	MSU	Aaron Burbridge 11 yd pass from Connor Cook (Michael Geiger kick)	MSU 21–13
2	01:07	IND	Simmie Cobbs Jr. 37 yd pass from Nate Sudfeld (Griffin Oakes kick)	MSU 21–20
3	11:07	MSU	Josiah Price 13 yd pass from Connor Cook (Michael Geiger kick)	MSU 28–20
3	09:45	IND	Andre Booker 3 yd pass from Nate Sudfeld (Griffin Oakes PAT failed)	MSU 28–26
4	12:44	MSU	Michael Geiger 21 yd field goal	MSU 31–26
4	04:57	MSU	R.J. Shelton 10 yd pass from Connor Cook (Michael Geiger kick)	MSU 38–26
4	02:17	MSU	LJ Scott 26 yd run (Michael Geiger kick)	MSU 45–26
4	01:17	MSU	Gerald Holmes 22 yd run (Michael Geiger kick)	MSU 52–26

Statistics	IND	MSU
First downs	20	33
Total yards	389	540
Rushing yards	81	142
Passing yards	308	398
Turnovers	2	1
Time of possession	21:01	38:59

Team	Category	Player	Statistics
Indiana	Passing	Nate Sudfeld	23/37, 308 yards, 3 TD, INT
Indiana	Rushing	Jordan Howard	11 rushes, 78 yards, TD
Indiana	Receiving	Simmie Cobbs	5 receptions, 108 yards, TD
Michigan State	Passing	Connor Cook	30/52, 398 yards, 4 TD
Michigan State	Rushing	L. J. Scott	11 rushes, 68 yards, TD
Michigan State	Receiving	Aaron Burbridge	8 receptions, 128 yards, TD

=== At Nebraska ===
Michigan State at Nebraska

Team	1	2	3	4	Total
No. 6 Spartans	3	14	14	7	38
• Cornhuskers	10	3	7	19	39

- Date: November 7th
- Location:
  Memorial Stadium
  Lincoln, NE
- Game start: 7:05 p.m.
- Elapsed time: 3:38
- Game attendance: 90,094
- Game weather: 49 °F (9 °C), Wind: Calm, Clear
- Referee: John O'Neill
- TV announcers (ESPN):
  Dave Pasch (Play-by-Play)
  Brian Griese (Analyst)
  Tom Luginbill (Sideline)

Statistics	MSU	NEB
First downs	25	24
Total yards	491	499
Rushing yards	143	179
Passing yards	348	320
Turnovers	1	2
Time of possession	32:25	27:35

Team	Category	Player	Statistics
Michigan State	Passing	Connor Cook	23/37, 335 yards, 4 TD, INT
Michigan State	Rushing	Gerald Holmes	22 rushes, 117 yards, TD
Michigan State	Receiving	Aaron Burbridge	10 receptions, 164 yards, TD
Nebraska	Passing	Tommy Armstrong Jr.	19/33, 320 yards, 2 TD, 2 INT
Nebraska	Rushing	Imani Cross	18 rushes, 98 yards, TD
Nebraska	Receiving	Jordan Westerkamp	9 receptions, 143 yards, TD

Nebraska handed Michigan State their only loss of the regular season due to a controversial touchdown. Nebraska receiver Brandon Reilly stepped out of bounds, but reestablished himself as a player and caught the touchdown pass. The officials ruled that he was forced out of bounds and gave Nebraska the touchdown. Michigan State tried to get into field goal range to kick a field goal that would win them the game, but failed to do so. At the last second, Connor Cook (surrounded by Nebraska defenders) threw the ball incomplete into the end zone to avoid being sacked and Nebraska upset the Spartans 39–38.

The loss gave MSU its first loss of the season falling to 8–1.

=== Maryland ===
Maryland at Michigan State

Team	1	2	3	4	Total
Terrapins	7	0	0	0	7
• No. 13 Spartans	7	10	7	0	24

- Date: November 14th
- Location:
  Spartan Stadium
  East Lansing, MI
- Game start: 12:01 p.m.
- Elapsed time: 3:23
- Game attendance: 73,406
- Game weather: 45 °F (7 °C), Wind 8 mph (13 km/h) W, Sunny
- Referee: Jerry McGinn
- TV announcers (ESPN2):
  Beth Mowins (Play-by-Play)
  Anthony Becht (Analyst)
  Paul Carcaterra (Sideline)

Scoring summary
1	06:52	MSU	Macgarrett Kings 10 yard pass from Tyler O'Connor (Michael Geiger kick)	MSU 7–0
1	04:23	MD	Brandon Ross 1 yard run (Adam Greene kick)	TIE 7–7
2	02:07	MSU	Riley Bullough 44 yard interception return (Michael Geiger kick)	MSU 14–7
2	00:00	MSU	Michael Geiger 35 yard field goal	MSU 17–7
3	07:20	MSU	Gerald Holmes 3 yard run (Michael Geiger kick)	MSU 24–7

Statistics	MD	MSU
First downs	16	16
Total yards	289	262
Rushing yards	107	141
Passing yards	182	121
Turnovers	5	3
Time of possession	27:49	32:11

Team	Category	Player	Statistics
Maryland	Passing	Perry Hills	14/30, 140 yards, INT
Maryland	Rushing	Wes Brown	12 rushes, 52 yards
Maryland	Receiving	Amba Etta-Tawo	5 receptions, 63 yards
Michigan State	Passing	Connor Cook	6/20, 77 yards, INT
Michigan State	Rushing	Gerald Holmes	18 rushes, 83 yards, TD
Michigan State	Receiving	MacGarrett Kings Jr.	4 receptions, 48 yards, TD

After a controversial loss on the road against Nebraska, Michigan State fell out of the top 10 for the first time all season and were looking to bounce back at home against a Maryland team that so far had gone winless in conference play.

Offensively, the Spartans struggled, as Connor Cook injured his shoulder during the first quarter and Tyler O'Connor had to play in relief. After Malik McDowell forced a Maryland fumble which was recovered by Damon Knox at the MD 48 yard line, O'Connor led the offense to a touchdown his first possession in on a 10-yard pass to Macgarrett Kings, capping off a 10 play, 50 yard drive. Maryland would respond with a touchdown of their own on their next possession, driving 91 yards in 10 plays, tying the game at 7 apiece on a Brandon Ross 1 yard touchdown run. With just over 2 minutes remaining in the half, Riley Bullough intercepted a Perry Hillis pass and returned it 44 yards for a touchdown, giving MSU a 14–7 lead. Several possessions later, Maryland would send in backup QB Caleb Rowe after Perry Hillis failed to get much going offensively for the Terrapins; Rowe would be intercepted by Arjen Colquhoun at the Maryland 20 yard line. Two quick Connor Cook pass completions to Aaron Burbridge and Josiah Price got MSU down to the Maryland 17 yard line before Michael Geiger made a 35-yard field goal as time expired, giving Michigan State a 17–7 lead at the half.

Tyler O'Connor would takeover as quarterback in the 2nd half as Connor Cook's injury prevented him from playing. After the defense forced a 3 and out on Maryland's opening drive, Michigan State's offense embarked on an 11 play, 62 yard drive where Gerald Holmes received 9 carries, rushing for 45 yards on the drive, including a 3-yard touchdown run that extended Michigan State's lead to 24–7. The remainder of the game was a defensive struggle, as Maryland would drive into Michigan State territory on three of their last four possessions, but would commit turnovers on all three of those possessions (fumble, turnover on downs, and an interception). Michigan State would run out the clock after Montae Nicholson picked off Caleb Rowe and returned the ball to the MSU 45 yard line.

The two teams combined to commit 8 turnovers, 3 by Michigan State, and 5 by Maryland. The Michigan State defense would force all 5 of those Maryland turnovers (3 interceptions, 2 fumbles), recorded its 2nd defensive touchdown of the season, and had 3 sacks. Michigan State improved to 9–1 (5–1 in conference play) on the season.

=== At No. 2 Ohio State ===
Michigan State at Ohio State

Team	1	2	3	4	Total
• No. 9 Spartans	0	7	0	10	17
No. 2 Buckeyes	0	7	7	0	14

- Date: November 21st
- Location:
  Ohio Stadium
  Columbus, OH
- Game start: 3:41 p.m.
- Elapsed time: 3:06
- Game attendance: 108,975
- Game weather: 51 °F (11 °C), Wind 8 mph (13 km/h) SW, Rain
- Referee: Dan Capron
- TV announcers (ABC):
  Chris Fowler (Play-by-Play)
  Kirk Herbstreit (Analyst)
  Heather Cox (Sideline)

Scoring summary
2	12:45	OSU	Ezekiel Elliott 1 yd run (Sean Nuernberger kick)	OSU 7–0
2	07:57	MSU	Trevon Pendleton 12 yd pass from Tyler O'Connor (Michael Geiger kick)	TIE 7–7
3	07:12	OSU	Jalin Marshall 6 yd pass from J. T. Barrett (Sean Nuernberger kick)	OSU 14–7
4	12:03	MSU	Gerald Holmes 2 yd run (Michael Geiger kick)	TIE 14–14
4	00:00	MSU	Michael Geiger 47 yd field goal	MSU 17–14

Statistics	MSU	OSU
First downs	17	5
Total yards	294	132
Rushing yards	203	86
Passing yards	91	46
Turnovers	2	0
Time of possession	38:10	21:50

Team	Category	Player	Statistics
Michigan State	Passing	Tyler O'Connor	7/12, 89 yards, TD
Michigan State	Rushing	Gerald Holmes	14 rushes, 65 yards, TD
Michigan State	Receiving	Aaron Burbridge	4 receptions, 62 yards
Ohio State	Passing	J. T. Barrett	9/16, 46 yards, TD
Ohio State	Rushing	J. T. Barrett	15 rushes, 44 yards
Ohio State	Receiving	Jalin Marshall	2 receptions, 22 yards, TD

The Spartans would be without senior QB Connor Cook (who was still recovering from the shoulder injury he had suffered the week prior against Maryland) going into their toughest road game of the season at #2 Ohio State, who were riding a 23-game win streak heading into the contest. The Buckeyes handed the Spartans one of their only 2 losses the previous season, and if Michigan State wanted to keep its goal of winning the Big Ten and securing a potential College Football Playoff spot alive, they had to win in Columbus. The weather conditions were cold and wet, which would make throwing the football a difficult task. Although Cook was seen dressed and warming up on the sidelines before the game began, the Spartans ultimately would employ a 2-QB system with both back-up QBs Tyler O'Connor and Damion Terry receiving playing time throughout the game.

Neither team would be able to score in the first quarter, with both defenses stifling the opposing offenses and forcing punts throughout the quarter. Michigan State would have the ball early in the 2nd quarter and would move the ball to near mid-field (MSU 44 yard line) before a sack on Damion Terry by Sam Hubbard would force the ball loose and fellow Ohio State defensive lineman Adolphus Washington would recover the fumble in MSU territory. 10 plays later, Ohio State would score the first points of the game on an Ezekiel Elliott 1 yard run, giving the Buckeyes a touchdown lead early in the 2nd quarter. However, the Spartans would answer on their ensuing offensive possession, driving 75 yards in 9 plays on a drive that featured two big passes from Tyler O'Connor, the first one being a 36-yard completion to Aaron Burbridge on 3rd and 14 that kept the drive alive, and a 12-yard pass to Trevon Pendleton that resulted in a touchdown, tying the game 7–7 midway through the half. After the MSU defense forced a quick 3 and out on the next OSU possession, a poor Cameron Johnston punt that only netted 5 yards would give MSU the ball at the Ohio State 23 yard line. Despite the favorable field position, the Spartan offense could not move the ball at all, and Michael Geiger would miss a 43-yard field goal attempt that would have given Michigan State a 3-point lead. That would end the scoring chances for either team for the remainder of the half, as both offenses would struggle to put a solid drive together. The game was tied 7–7 at the half.

Both offenses would continue to struggle well into the 3rd quarter until a muffed punt by Macgarrett Kings would be recovered by Ohio State at the Michigan State 6 yard line. Ohio State would waste little time taking advantage of the Spartans second turnover, as J. T. Barrett throw a touchdown pass to Jalin Marshall on the first play of the possession to give the Buckeyes a 14–7 lead with just over 3 minutes left to play in the quarter. Needing an answer on offense following a disastrous turnover on special teams, the Spartans began their next possession on their own 25 yard line and would move the ball to the OSU 34 yard line before the 3rd quarter came to the end. After a long, 13 play, 75 yard drive that extended into the 4th quarter, Michigan State would tie the score at 14–14 on a Gerald Holmes 2 yard touchdown run. The game would then turn into a battle of field position, as after an Ohio State drive sputtered out near mid-field, Cameron Johnston would pin the Michigan State offense at their own 4 yard line. The Spartan offense would dig themselves out of the hole on the first play, as LJ Scott would break through the middle for a 20-yard run, moving the ball to the MSU 24 yard line. MSU would move the ball all the way to their own 42 yard line before being forced to punt; Jake Hartbarger would pin Ohio State at their own 7 yard line. The Michigan State defense would force Ohio State to punt out of their own end-zone after the Buckeyes could only muster 4 yards on what would be their final offensive possession. On the punt attempt, Malik McDowell would get a hand on the ball, causing the punt to only net 37 yards and setting up the offense with favorable field position at the Ohio State 48 yard line. Needing only a field goal to win the game, Michigan State would begin their final drive with a little over 4 minutes remaining in the game. Using the run game to run time off the clock to ensure that regardless of the outcome of the drive, Ohio State would have no time left to score, the offense drove all the way to the OSU 23 yard line, using their final timeout with 3 seconds left on the clock to set up a Michael Geiger field goal attempt to win the game. Ohio State head coach Urban Meyer would use a timeout in an attempt to ice the kicker, but it would not have the desired effect as Geiger would convert on a 41-yard field goal attempt as the clock expired, giving Michigan State a 17–14 win.

Just trust your eyes, trust your leg. I knew I had the distance cause I made it once, I just had to swing through and hit an even better ball. It was great. Amazing feeling. I've been waiting my whole life to beat that team in this stadium.

— Michael Geiger on his thought process before kicking the game winning field goal.

Despite playing two backups at the QB position, Michigan State would snap Ohio State's 23-game winning streak on Senior day in Columbus; this would be the second time the Spartans would pull off such a feat, as two years prior MSU had snapped an Ohio State 24-game winning streak after beating the Buckeyes in the Big Ten Championship Game. Additionally, this was also the first time under Urban Meyer that Ohio State had lost a regular season conference game. Tyler O'Connor would finish the game completing 7/12 passes for 91 yards and a touchdown, however the running game was the prevailing theme of the day as LJ Scott and Gerald Holmes carried the brunt of the load, combining for 27 carries, 123 yards, and 1 touchdown; as a team they rushed for 203 yards. The Spartan offense also dominated the time of possession, controlling the ball for 38:10. The Michigan State defense held Ohio State to five first downs and 132 yards of total offense (86 rushing, 46 passing). The Buckeyes had six three-and-outs. The 132 yards were the fewest by an Urban Meyer-coached team and the fewest allowed by MSU since Illinois had 128 yards on Oct. 26, 2013. It was also the fewest total yards for a Buckeye team since 1999 (79 vs. Michigan State). Ohio State entered the game ranked first in the Big Ten in scoring offense (36.4 points per game) and rushing offense (244.8 yards per game) and second in total offense (453.3 yards per game). With the win, the Spartans took control of the East Division and only needed to defeat Penn State the following week to secure a 3rd appearance in the Big Ten Championship Game.

=== Penn State ===
Penn State at Michigan State
(Land Grant Trophy)

Team	1	2	3	4	Total
Nittany Lions	0	10	0	6	16
• No. 6 Spartans	6	14	14	21	55

- Date: November 28th
- Location:
  Spartan Stadium
  East Lansing, MI
- Game start: 3:35 p.m.
- Elapsed time: 3:25
- Game attendance: 74,705
- Game weather: 34 °F (1 °C), Wind 7 mph (11 km/h) NNE, Partly Cloudy
- Referee: Michael Cannon
- TV announcers (ESPN):
  Bob Wischusen (Play-by-Play)
  Brock Huard (Analyst)
  Shannon Spake (Sideline)

Scoring summary
1	09:35	MSU	R.J. Shelton 29 yd pass from Connor Cook (Michael Geiger kick failed)	MSU 6–0
2	14:14	PSU	Tyler Davis 19 yd field goal	MSU 6–3
2	07:12	MSU	Gerald Holmes 6 yd run (Michael Geiger kick)	MSU 13–3
2	02:36	MSU	Demetrious Cox 77 yd fumble return (Michael Geiger kick)	MSU 20–3
2	00:35	PSU	Chris Godwin 8 yd pass from Christian Hackenberg (Tyler Davis kick)	MSU 20–10
3	11:40	MSU	Aaron Burbridge 29 yd pass from Connor Cook (Michael Geiger kick)	MSU 27–10
3	03:31	MSU	Josiah Price 6 yd pass from Connor Cook (Michael Geiger kick)	MSU 34–10
4	14:51	PSU	Chris Godwin 5 yd pass from Christian Hackenberg (2-pt conversion failed)	MSU 34–16
4	11:18	MSU	LJ Scott 6 yd run (Michael Geiger kick)	MSU 41–16
4	09:56	MSU	Malik McDowell 13 yd interception return (Michael Geiger kick)	MSU 48–16
4	09:48	MSU	Jack Allen 9 yd run (Michael Geiger kick)	MSU 55–16

Statistics	PSU	MSU
First downs	20	24
Total yards	418	436
Rushing yards	122	188
Passing yards	296	248
Turnovers	4	1
Time of possession	30:12	29:48

Team	Category	Player	Statistics
Penn State	Passing	Christian Hackenberg	22/39, 257 yards, 2 TD, 2 INT
Penn State	Rushing	Saquon Barkley	17 rushes, 103 yards
Penn State	Receiving	Chris Godwin	11 receptions, 109 yards, 2 TD
Michigan State	Passing	Connor Cook	19/26, 248 yards, 3 TD
Michigan State	Rushing	Gerald Holmes	12 rushes, 64 yards, TD
Michigan State	Receiving	Aaron Burbridge	6 receptions, 75 yards, TD

After defeating Ohio State the previous week on a last second Michael Geiger field goal, Michigan State controlled its destiny in the Big Ten East division. All they needed to do was defeat rival Penn State, and they would play Iowa in the Big Ten Championship Game. The Spartans defeated the Nittany Lions the year before 34–10 on their way to receiving a bid to the Cotton Bowl.

Penn State's first possession was cut short as a Christian Hackenberg pass was intercepted in the end zone by MSU DB Arjen Colquhoun. Connor Cook and the Spartan offense would take advantage of the turnover, scoring on a 9 play, 80 yard drive which ended with a R.J. Shelton 29 yard touchdown reception, giving Michigan State an early touchdown lead. Michael Geiger would miss the extra point, only the 4th missed extra point attempt of his career. Neither team would score the remainder of the quarter. In the 2nd quarter, Penn State would score a field goal after being stopped at the MSU 1 yard line on 2nd and 3rd down, pulling them within 3. On the next Penn State possession, the Spartan defense would give the offense favorable field position after a Malik McDowell sack of Christian Hackenberg on 3rd and 7 with just over 10 minutes left in the half resulted in a loss of 10 yards, causing Penn State to punt from their own 5 yard line. 6 plays later, Gerald Holmes would score a touchdown on a 6-yard run, giving Michigan State a 13–6 lead with 7 minutes remaining in the half. The next Penn State possession ended in disaster for the Nittany Lions after Kyle Carter fumbled on a 10-yard reception that would have given Penn State a 1st down at the MSU 23 yard line. Instead, Demetrious Cox would scoop up the fumble and return it 77 yards for a touchdown, giving Michigan State a 20–3 lead late in the first half. Penn State would recover with a 10 play, 67 yard touchdown drive, capped off by a Chris Godwin 8 yard touchdown reception, cutting the lead to 20–10 at halftime.

The Michigan State offense would score a touchdown on the opening drive of the second half with a tremendous individual effort from Aaron Burbridge on a 29-yard pass from Connor Cook, where Burbridge was forced out of bounds, re-established position in bounds, made the catch, stayed on his feet, made 2 spin moves, and broke several tackles to get into the end zone, giving Michigan State a 27–10 lead with a little under 12 minutes to play in the third quarter. The Spartans added another touchdown to their lead on their next possession, as they drove the ball 69 yards in 12 plays, with Connor Cook throwing his third touchdown pass of the game to Josiah Price to enlarge the lead to 34–10. Penn State scored a touchdown on their next possession after a Saed Blacknall 77-yard reception (in which Demetrious Cox knocked the ball out of his hands from behind and nearly recovered it) put PSU in the red zone where Christian Hackenberg threw his second touchdown pass of the game to Saquon Barkley. They would go for 2 but fail, putting the score at 34–16. This would be the last time Penn State would score; Michigan State would add 3 more touchdowns, which included a LJ Scott 6 yard touchdown run, a Malik McDowell pick-six returned for 13 yards, and after Penn State fumbled on a kickoff return, a 9-yard touchdown run by Senior center Jack Allen. Michigan State would win in blowout fashion, 55–16, in the process securing the Big Ten East Division.

With the victory, Michigan State won their third division title, (two Legends Division titles, one East Division title) and went on to play Iowa in the Big Ten Championship Game, tying Wisconsin for most appearances in the championship game at 3. Dating back to 2010, this was Michigan State's third straight win over the Nittany Lions, with the rivalry seeing a three-year hiatus during the 2011, 2012, and 2013 seasons. Connor Cook threw for 3 touchdowns for the 10th time in his career.

The Spartans moved to 11–1 on the season.

=== Vs. No. 4 Iowa (Big Ten Championship Game) ===
Michigan State vs Iowa
(Big Ten Championship Game)

Team	1	2	3	4	Total
• No. 5 Spartans	3	0	6	7	16
No. 4 Hawkeyes	3	3	0	7	13

- Date:
  December 5
- Location:
  Lucas Oil Stadium
  Indianapolis, IN
- Game start: 8:18 p.m.
- Elapsed time: 3:31
- Game attendance: 66,985
- Game weather: Indoors (retractable roof closed)
- Referee: John O'Neill
- TV announcers (FOX):
  Gus Johnson (Play-by-Play)
  Joel Klatt (Analyst)
  Molly McGrath (Sideline)

Statistics	MSU	IOWA
First downs	20	13
Total yards	365	268
Rushing yards	174	52
Passing yards	191	216
Turnovers	1	3
Time of possession	36:38	23:22

Team	Category	Player	Statistics
Michigan State	Passing	Connor Cook	16/32, 191 yards, INT
Michigan State	Rushing	L. J. Scott	22 rushes, 73 yards, TD
Michigan State	Receiving	Aaron Burbridge	5 receptions, 61 yards
Iowa	Passing	C. J. Beathard	18/26, 216 yards, TD, INT
Iowa	Rushing	Derrick Mitchell Jr.	4 rushes, 24 yards
Iowa	Receiving	Tevaun Smith	5 receptions, 110 yards, TD

The Spartans faced Iowa in the Big Ten Championship, marking MSU's third appearance in the five Championship games held. A defensive struggle throughout which including an interception of a C.J. Beathard pass in the end zone by Demetrious Cox, saw only field goals in the first half as Iowa took a 6–3 lead. Defense continued in the second half as MSU added two more field goals to take a 9–6 lead. However, Iowa struck with a big play on the first play of the fourth quarter when Beathard hit Tevaun Smith on an 85-yard pass and catch for a touchdown. The score put Iowa up 13–9. Both teams punted on their next possession and MSU took over at their own 18 yard line with 9:31 left in the game. The Spartans engineered a 22 play, 82 yard, 9:04 drive to score a touchdown on an LJ Scott one yard run with 27 seconds remaining in the game. The dive by Scott gave the Spartans a 16–13 lead. On the drive, the longest drive of the season for the Spartans, MSU ran the ball on 17 of the 22 plays, Scott with 14 of the rushes. MSU's defense stymied Iowa on the final drive of the game and the Spartans won their second Big Ten Championship in the three years.

The Spartans moved to 12–1 on the season. Following the game, MSU was awarded the No. 3 seed in the College Football Playoff to face Alabama.

=== Vs. No. 2 Alabama (College Football Playoff at the Cotton Bowl Classic) ===
Michigan State vs Alabama
(Cotton Bowl Classic)

Team	1	2	3	4	Total
No. 3 Spartans	0	0	0	0	0
• No. 2 Crimson Tide	0	10	21	7	38

- Date:
  December 31
- Location:
  AT&T Stadium
  Arlington, TX
- TV announcers (ESPN):
  Chris Fowler (Play-by-Play)
  Kirk Herbstreit (Analyst)
  Heather Cox (Sideline)

Statistics	MSU	ALA
First downs	16	21
Total yards	239	440
Rushing yards	29	154
Passing yards	210	286
Turnovers	2	0
Time of possession	27:04	32:56

Team	Category	Player	Statistics
Michigan State	Passing	Connor Cook	19/39, 210 yards, 2 INT
Michigan State	Rushing	Damion Terry	1 rush, 14 yards
Michigan State	Receiving	Josiah Price	4 receptions, 39 yards
Alabama	Passing	Jake Coker	25/30, 286 yards, 2 TD
Alabama	Rushing	Derrick Henry	20 rushes, 75 yards, 2 TD
Alabama	Receiving	Calvin Ridley	8 receptions, 138 yards, 2 TD

After Oklahoma lost to Clemson 37–17 in the Orange Bowl Semifinal, Michigan State was throttled by Alabama 38–0 in the Cotton Bowl Classic Semifinal. A tight first half saw Alabama take a 10–0 lead into halftime. Near the end of the second quarter, Michigan State had its best drive of the night, but all-time winningest MSU quarterback, Connor Cook, was intercepted by Cyrus Jones. Alabama scored a touchdown on the opening possession of the second half and MSU turned the ball over on its first possession. Alabama could not capitalize on the turnover, but did return MSU's next punt for a touchdown, putting the game out of reach at 24–0 with a little over three minutes remaining in the third quarter. MSU's offense could not muster any points and were held to a total of 249 yards. Cook finished the night with zero touchdowns and two interceptions.

Alabama would go on to defeat Clemson 45–40 for the 2016 College Football Playoff National Championship.

== Rankings ==
Ranking movements Legend: ██ Increase in ranking ██ Decrease in ranking ( ) = First-place votes
	Week															
Poll	Pre	1	2	3	4	5	6	7	8	9	10	11	12	13	14	Final
AP	5	5	4 (2)	2 (7)	2 (5)	4	7	7	6	6	14	9	6	5	3 (1)	6
Coaches	6	6	4	3 (3)	2 (2)	3 (1)	4 (1)	4	5	6	14	9	6	5	4	6
CFP	Not released									7	13	9	5	5	3	Not released
