= 2015 Big Ten Football Championship Game =

- Conference Championship
Michigan State Spartans	Iowa Hawkeyes
(11–1)	(12–0)
16	13
Head coach: Mark Dantonio	Head coach: Kirk Ferentz
AP / Coaches / CFP; 5 / 5 / 5	AP / Coaches / CFP; 4 / 3 / 4
	1	2	3	4	Total
Michigan State	3	0	6	7	16
Iowa	3	3	0	7	13
- Date: December 5, 2015
- Season: 2015
- Stadium: Lucas Oil Stadium
- Location: Indianapolis, IN
- MVP: Connor Cook (MSU)
- Favorite: Michigan State by 3
- National anthem: Hawkeye Marching Band and Michigan State University Spartan Marching Band
- Referee: John O'Neill
- Attendance: 66,985

United States TV coverage
- Network: Fox
- Announcers: Gus Johnson (play-by-play), Joel Klatt (color analyst), Molly McGrath (sideline)
- Nielsen ratings: 5.7 (9.8 million viewers)

2015 Big Ten Conference football standings
	Conf.			Overall
Team	W		L	W		L
East Division
No. 6 Michigan State xy$^	7	–	1	12	–	2
No. 4 Ohio State x	7	–	1	12	–	1
No. 12 Michigan	6	–	2	10	–	3
Penn State	4	–	4	7	–	6
Indiana	2	–	6	6	–	7
Rutgers	1	–	7	4	–	8
Maryland	1	–	7	3	–	9
West Division
No. 9 Iowa xy	8	–	0	12	–	2
No. 23 Northwestern	6	–	2	10	–	3
No. 21 Wisconsin	6	–	2	10	–	3
Nebraska	3	–	5	6	–	7
Minnesota	2	–	6	6	–	7
Illinois	2	–	6	5	–	7
Purdue	1	–	7	2	–	10
Championship: Michigan State 16, Iowa 13
^ – College Football Playoff participant; $ – Conference champion; x – Division champion/co-champions; y – Championship game participant; Rankings from AP Poll

The 2015 Big Ten Football Championship Game was a college football game that was played on December 5, 2015, at Lucas Oil Stadium in Indianapolis, Indiana. It was the fifth annual Big Ten Football Championship Game, and it determined the 2015 champion of the Big Ten Conference. The game featured the Michigan State Spartans, champions of the East Division, and the Iowa Hawkeyes, champions of the West Division. Michigan State defeated Iowa 16–13 to win its second Big Ten Championship in three years. Since both teams were #5 and #4 respectively, the winner automatically clinch a berth to the four-team College Football Playoff.

== History ==
The 2015 Championship Game was the fifth in the Big Ten's 120-year history, and the second to feature the conference's East and West division alignment. Iowa made its first appearance in the conference championship game, while Michigan State made its third appearance (L in 2011, W in 2013). To date, this game holds the Big Ten Football Championship Game attendance record.

== Teams ==
=== Michigan State ===
Michigan State entered the Big Ten Championship Game with an 11–1 record and the No. 5 ranking in the College Football Playoff. On offense, the Spartans were led by Big Ten QB of the Year Connor Cook and Big Ten Receiver of the Year Aaron Burbridge. In the trenches, Jack Allen and Jack Conklin anchored the offensive line, while Shilique Calhoun and Malik McDowell led an imposing, stingy defensive unit.

The Spartans survived a dramatic regular season to capture the Big Ten East division title. On October 17, they scored on the final play of the game (a botched punt attempt) at rival Michigan to win 27–23. Three weeks later, Michigan State lost its only regular season game 39–38 at Nebraska. Then, in a de facto East division title game, the Spartans defeated defending National champion and No. 2 Ohio State in Columbus 17–14, as kicker Michael Geiger drilled a 41-yard field goal as time expired.

=== Iowa ===
Iowa came into the Big Ten Championship Game with a 12–0 record and the No. 4 ranking in the College Football Playoff. The Hawkeyes were led by junior QB C.J. Beathard and 2015 Big Ten Defensive Back of the Year, junior CB Desmond King, who tied the school record and led the Big Ten with 8 INT.

The Hawkeyes sat atop the Big Ten West division standings wire-to-wire. They opened conference play with a hard-nosed 10–6 victory over the Wisconsin Badgers in Madison, and overwhelmed the Northwestern Wildcats 40–10 in Evanston two weeks later. Iowa clinched the Big Ten West division by defeating the Purdue Boilermakers 40–20 in the home finale at Kinnick Stadium, and completed an unbeaten regular season by defeating the Nebraska Cornhuskers 28–20 in Lincoln.

Head coach Kirk Ferentz was named Big Ten Coach of the Year for the fourth time after guiding Iowa to its first unbeaten regular season in 93 years.

== Game summary ==
Iowa turned the ball over twice in the first half – a fumble leading to the Spartans first points and an interception in the end zone – but led 6–3. Michigan State dominated the third quarter in time of possession and yardage, and two field goals from Michael Geiger to lead 9–6. Trailing entering the 4th quarter for the first time all season, the Hawkeyes responded in a big way with an 85-yard touchdown pass from C. J. Beathard to Tevaun Smith that gave Iowa a 13–9 lead with 14:49 remaining. After exchanging punts, Michigan State marched 82 yards in 22 plays and took 9:04 off the clock. The game-winning score came on a 1-yard touchdown run by LJ Scott with 27 seconds left.

Scoring summary

Quarter	Time	Drive			Team	Scoring information	Score	
Quarter	Time	Plays	Yards	TOP	Team	Scoring information	Michigan State	Iowa
1	11:11	7	22	2:58	MSU	23-yard field goal by Michael Geiger	3	0
1	5:08	7	14	1:49	IOWA	24-yard field goal by Marshall Koehn	3	3
2	13:28	9	42	4:33	IOWA	43-yard field goal by Koehn	3	6
3	4:23	11	47	4:49	MSU	29-yard field goal by Geiger	6	6
3	0:57	6	33	2:38	MSU	47-yard field goal by Geiger	9	6
4	14:49	2	85	1:08	IOWA	Tevaun Smith 85-yard touchdown reception from C. J. Beathard, Koehn kick good	9	13
4	0:27	22	82	9:04	MSU	LJ Scott 2-yard touchdown run, Geiger kick good	16	13
"TOP" = time of possession. For other American football terms, see Glossary of American football.							16	13

=== Statistics ===
Statistics	MSU	IOWA
First downs	20	13
Plays–yards	79–365	51–268
Rushes–yards	46–174	24–52
Passing yards	191	216
Passing: comp–att–int	16–33–1	18–27–1
Turnovers		
Time of possession	36:38	23:22

Team	Category	Player	Statistics
Michigan State	Passing	Connor Cook	16/32, 191 yards, 1 INT
Michigan State	Rushing	LJ Scott	22 carries, 73 yards, 1 TD
Michigan State	Receiving	Aaron Burbridge	5 receptions, 61 yards
Iowa	Passing	C. J. Beathard	18/26, 216 yards, 1 TD, 1 INT
Iowa	Rushing	Derrick Mitchell Jr.	4 carries, 24 yards
Iowa	Receiving	Tevaun Smith	5 receptions, 110 yards, 1 TD

== Aftermath ==
Michigan State, who had been ranked fifth in the College Football Playoff rankings heading into the game, jumped to third behind Alabama. Alabama beat then-No. 18 Florida 29–15 in the SEC Championship Game on the same day. As a result, Michigan State received a bid to the national semifinal against second-seeded Alabama in the Cotton Bowl Classic. Alabama defeated Michigan State 38–0 and later defeated No. 1 Clemson in the National Championship game. Iowa fell to fifth in the CFP rankings and received a bid to the Rose Bowl where they were defeated by Stanford 45–16.

== See also ==
- List of Big Ten Conference football champions
