= 2015 Purdue Boilermakers football team =

American college football season

2015 Purdue Boilermakers football
- Conference: Big Ten Conference
- West Division
- Record: 2–10 (1–7 Big Ten)
- Head coach: Darrell Hazell (3rd season)
- Offensive coordinator: John Shoop (3rd season)
- Offensive scheme: Pro-style/Single back
- Defensive coordinator: Greg Hudson (3rd season)
- Base defense: 3–4 or 4–3
- Captains: Robert Kugler; Danny Anthrop; Frankie Williams; Ja'Whaun Bentley
- Home stadium: Ross–Ade Stadium

2015 Big Ten Conference football standings
	Conf.			Overall
Team	W		L	W		L
East Division
No. 6 Michigan State xy$^	7	–	1	12	–	2
No. 4 Ohio State x	7	–	1	12	–	1
No. 12 Michigan	6	–	2	10	–	3
Penn State	4	–	4	7	–	6
Indiana	2	–	6	6	–	7
Rutgers	1	–	7	4	–	8
Maryland	1	–	7	3	–	9
West Division
No. 9 Iowa xy	8	–	0	12	–	2
No. 23 Northwestern	6	–	2	10	–	3
No. 21 Wisconsin	6	–	2	10	–	3
Nebraska	3	–	5	6	–	7
Minnesota	2	–	6	6	–	7
Illinois	2	–	6	5	–	7
Purdue	1	–	7	2	–	10
Championship: Michigan State 16, Iowa 13
^ – College Football Playoff participant; $ – Conference champion; x – Division champion/co-champions; y – Championship game participant; Rankings from AP Poll

The 2015 Purdue Boilermakers football team was an American football team that represented Purdue University during the 2015 NCAA Division I FBS football season. The Boilermakers competed in the West Division of the Big Ten Conference and played their home games at Ross–Ade Stadium in West Lafayette, Indiana. The team was led by head coach Darrell Hazell, who was in his third season at Purdue.

Purdue finished the season 2–10, 1–7 in Big Ten play, to finish in last place in the West Division.

== Preseason ==
In 2014, Purdue compiled a 3–9 record, 1–7 in Big Ten play, to finish in last place in the West Division. As a result of their poor record, Purdue was not bowl eligible for the second consecutive year. Their only conference win came against Illinois. The 2014 season marked the first time since 1993 that Purdue finished with the worst record in the Big Ten in back-to-back seasons.

On January 20, 2015, wide receivers coach Kevin Sherman left the program for the same position at Pittsburgh. As a result, Purdue hired Terry Malone to be the news tight ends coach, moving former tight ends coach Gerad Parker to wide receivers coach.

== Recruiting ==
=== Position key ===
Back	B	Center	C	Cornerback	CB	Defensive back	DB
Defensive end	DE	Defensive lineman	DL	Defensive tackle	DT	End	E
Fullback	FB	Guard	G	Halfback	HB	Kicker	K
Kickoff returner	KR	Offensive tackle	OT	Offensive lineman	OL	Linebacker	LB
Long snapper	LS	Punter	P	Punt returner	PR	Quarterback	QB
Running back	RB	Safety	S	Tight end	TE	Wide receiver	WR

=== Recruits ===
Purdue's recruiting class consisted a total of 26 recruits.

College recruiting (2015)
Name	Hometown	School	Height	Weight	40^{‡}	Commit date
Markus Bailey; LB	Hilliard, Ohio	Hilliard Davidson H.S.	6 ft 1 in (1.85 m)	210 lb (95 kg)	4.7	Jul 13, 2014
Markus Bailey; LB	Recruit ratings: Scout: Rivals: 247Sports: ESPN:					
Fred Brown; DT	Boutte, Louisiana	Hahnville H.S.	6 ft 2 in (1.88 m)	255 lb (116 kg)	--	Feb 1, 2015
Fred Brown; DT	Recruit ratings: Scout: Rivals: 247Sports: ESPN:					
Andy Chelf; S	Southlake, Texas	Carroll Senior H.S.	6 ft 0 in (1.83 m)	185 lb (84 kg)	4.5	Jun 10, 2014
Andy Chelf; S	Recruit ratings: Scout: Rivals: 247Sports: ESPN:					
Wyatt Cook; LB	Owings Mills, Maryland	McDonogh School	6 ft 2 in (1.88 m)	220 lb (100 kg)	--	Jul 1, 2014
Wyatt Cook; LB	Recruit ratings: Scout: Rivals: 247Sports: ESPN:					
Evyn Cooper; ATH	Buford, Georgia	Buford H. S.	6 ft 2 in (1.88 m)	190 lb (86 kg)	--	Dec 2, 2014
Evyn Cooper; ATH	Recruit ratings: Scout: Rivals: 247Sports: ESPN:					
Sawyer Dawson; LB	Plant City, Florida	Plant City H. S.	6 ft 2 in (1.88 m)	190 lb (86 kg)	--	Jun 30, 2014
Sawyer Dawson; LB	Recruit ratings: Scout: Rivals: 247Sports: ESPN:					
Tim Faison; DE	Tallahassee, Florida	Godby H. S.	6 ft 2 in (1.88 m)	195 lb (88 kg)	--	Nov 19, 2014
Tim Faison; DE	Recruit ratings: Scout: Rivals: 247Sports: ESPN:					
Tario Fuller; RB	Sugar Hill, Georgia	Lanier H. S.	6 ft 0 in (1.83 m)	190 lb (86 kg)	--	Jun 29, 2014
Tario Fuller; RB	Recruit ratings: Scout: Rivals: 247Sports: ESPN:					
Shayne Henley; DE	Moorpark, California	Moorpark College	6 ft 4 in (1.93 m)	245 lb (111 kg)	--	Dec 7, 2014
Shayne Henley; DE	Recruit ratings: Scout: Rivals: 247Sports: ESPN:					
Brycen Hopkins; TE	Nashville, Tennessee	The Ensworth School	6 ft 5 in (1.96 m)	240 lb (110 kg)	--	Dec 7, 2014
Brycen Hopkins; TE	Recruit ratings: Scout: Rivals: 247Sports: ESPN:					
Markell Jones; RB	Columbus, Indiana	Columbus East H. S.	5 ft 9 in (1.75 m)	204 lb (93 kg)	4.6	Jun 24, 2014
Markell Jones; RB	Recruit ratings: Scout: Rivals: 247Sports: ESPN:					
Michael Little; DB	Sherman Oaks, California	Notre Dame H. S.	6 ft 0 in (1.83 m)	170 lb (77 kg)	--	Dec 7, 2014
Michael Little; DB	Recruit ratings: Scout: Rivals: 247Sports: ESPN:					
Anthony Mahoungou; WR	Coalinga, California	West Hills College Coalinga	6 ft 4 in (1.93 m)	205 lb (93 kg)	--	Dec 7, 2014
Anthony Mahoungou; WR	Recruit ratings: Scout: Rivals: 247Sports: ESPN:					
Ben Makowski; LS	Mishawaka, Indiana	Penn H. S.	6 ft 2 in (1.88 m)	250 lb (110 kg)	--	Jun 13, 2014
Ben Makowski; LS	Recruit ratings: Scout: Rivals: 247Sports: ESPN:					
Matt McCann; OL	Indianapolis, Indiana	Bishop Chatard H. S.	6 ft 6 in (1.98 m)	305 lb (138 kg)	5.2	Jun 13, 2014
Matt McCann; OL	Recruit ratings: Scout: Rivals: 247Sports: ESPN:					
Michael Mendez; OL	Los Fresnos, Texas	Los Fresnos H. S.	6 ft 4 in (1.93 m)	285 lb (129 kg)	--	Feb 4, 2015
Michael Mendez; OL	Recruit ratings: Scout: Rivals: 247Sports: ESPN:					
David Rose; DB	Oxon Hill, Maryland	Potomac H. S.	6 ft 0 in (1.83 m)	175 lb (79 kg)	--	Dec 19, 2014
David Rose; DB	Recruit ratings: Scout: Rivals: 247Sports: ESPN:					
Joe Schopper; K	Indianapolis, Indiana	Cathedral H. S.	6 ft 0 in (1.83 m)	188 lb (85 kg)	--	Aug 5, 2014
Joe Schopper; K	Recruit ratings: Scout: Rivals: 247Sports: ESPN:					
Elijah Sindelar; QB	Princeton, Kentucky	Caldwell County H. S.	6 ft 4 in (1.93 m)	200 lb (91 kg)	4.7	Feb 11, 2014
Elijah Sindelar; QB	Recruit ratings: Scout: Rivals: 247Sports: ESPN:					
Peyton Truitt; OL	West Lafayette, Indiana	West Lafayette Junior-Senior H.S.	6 ft 4 in (1.93 m)	284 lb (129 kg)	--	Aug 24, 2014
Peyton Truitt; OL	Recruit ratings: Scout: Rivals: 247Sports: ESPN:					
Jess Trussell; TE	Arlington, Texas	Martin H.S.	6 ft 5 in (1.96 m)	219 lb (99 kg)	4.7	Jan 22, 2015
Jess Trussell; TE	Recruit ratings: Scout: Rivals: 247Sports: ESPN:					
Chazmyn Turner; DE	Mooresville, North Carolina	Mooresville H.S.	6 ft 5 in (1.96 m)	240 lb (110 kg)	--	Dec 7, 2014
Chazmyn Turner; DE	Recruit ratings: Scout: Rivals: 247Sports: ESPN:					
Larry Wells; OL	Kenton, Ohio	Kenton H.S.	6 ft 6 in (1.98 m)	310 lb (140 kg)	--	Jan 18, 2015
Larry Wells; OL	Recruit ratings: Scout: Rivals: 247Sports: ESPN:					
Eddy Wilson; DT	West Bloomfield, Michigan	West Bloomfield H.S.	6 ft 4 in (1.93 m)	265 lb (120 kg)	--	Jan 17, 2015
Eddy Wilson; DT	Recruit ratings: Scout: Rivals: 247Sports: ESPN:					
Richard Worship; FB	Parma Heights, Ohio	Valley Forge H.S.	6 ft 1 in (1.85 m)	245 lb (111 kg)	4.7	Jun 29, 2014
Richard Worship; FB	Recruit ratings: Scout: Rivals: 247Sports: ESPN:					
Domonique Young; WR	Norwalk, California	Cerritos College	6 ft 4 in (1.93 m)	195 lb (88 kg)	--	Jan 29, 2014
Domonique Young; WR	Recruit ratings: Scout: Rivals: 247Sports: ESPN:					
Overall recruit ranking: Scout: 62 Rivals: 63 247Sports: 65 ESPN: 55
Note: In many cases, Scout, Rivals, 247Sports, On3, and ESPN may conflict in their listings of height and weight.; In these cases, the average was taken. ESPN grades are on a 100-point scale.; Sources: "Purdue Football Commitments". Rivals.; "2015 Purdue Football Commits". Scout.; "ESPN". ESPN.; "Scout.com Team Recruiting Rankings". Scout.; "2015 Team Ranking". Rivals.com.; "2015 Purdue Boilermakers football team". 247Sports.

== Schedule ==
Purdue announced their 2015 football schedule on June 3, 2013. The 2015 schedule consist of 7 home and 5 away games in the regular season. The Boilermakers will host Big Ten foes Illinois, Indiana, Minnesota, and Nebraska and will travel to Iowa, Michigan State, Northwestern, and Wisconsin.

The Boilermakers hosted three of their four non conference games against Bowling Green, Indiana State and Virginia Tech. Purdue traveled to Huntington, West Virginia to face Marshall of the Conference USA on September 6.

Originally Purdue had Notre Dame scheduled instead of Virginia Tech, but due to scheduling conflicts the Hokies were scheduled instead of the Fighting Irish.

Date	Time	Opponent	Site	TV	Result	Attendance
September 6	3:00 pm	at Marshall*	Joan C. Edwards Stadium; Huntington, WV	FS1	L 31–41	38,791
September 12	12:00 pm	No. 21 (FCS) Indiana State*	Ross–Ade Stadium; West Lafayette, IN	ESPNews	W 38–14	41,158
September 19	3:30 pm	Virginia Tech*	Ross–Ade Stadium; West Lafayette, IN	ESPNU	L 24–51	45,759
September 26	12:00 pm	Bowling Green*	Ross–Ade Stadium; West Lafayette, IN	BTN	L 28–35	33,162
October 3	12:00 pm	at No. 2 Michigan State	Spartan Stadium; East Lansing, MI	ESPN2	L 21–24	74,418
October 10	3:30 pm	Minnesota	Ross–Ade Stadium; West Lafayette, IN	ESPNU	L 13–41	33,780
October 17	12:00 pm	at Wisconsin	Camp Randall Stadium; Madison, WI	BTN	L 7–24	80,794
October 31	12:00 pm	Nebraska	Ross–Ade Stadium; West Lafayette, IN	ESPNU	W 55–45	31,351
November 7	12:00 pm	Illinois^{†}	Ross–Ade Stadium; West Lafayette, IN (Battle for the Purdue Cannon)	BTN	L 14–48	40,197
November 14	12:00 pm	at No. 24 Northwestern	Ryan Field; Evanston, IL	BTN	L 14–21	30,003
November 21	12:00 pm	at No. 6 Iowa	Kinnick Stadium; Iowa City, IA	ESPN2	L 20–40	62,920
November 28	12:00 pm	Indiana	Ross–Ade Stadium; West Lafayette, IN (Old Oaken Bucket)	BTN	L 36–54	37,152
*Non-conference game; ^{†}Homecoming; Rankings from AP Poll released prior to game; All times are in Eastern time

Schedule source:

== Radio ==
Radio coverage for all games was broadcast statewide on The Purdue Sports Network and on Sirius XM Satellite Radio. The radio announcers were Tim Newton with play-by-play, Pete Quinn with color commentary, and Kelly Kitchel with sideline reports.

== Game summaries ==
=== At Marshall ===
Purdue at Marshall

Team	1	2	3	4	Total
Boilermakers	14	7	7	3	31
• Thundering Herd	17	0	10	14	41

- Date: September 6
- Location: Joan C. Edwards Stadium
  Huntington, WV
- Game start: 3:05 p.m. EDT
- Elapsed time: 3:41
- Game attendance: 38,791
- Game weather: 89 °F (32 °C), Sunny, NE 2 mph (3.2 km/h)
- Referee: Ken Antee
- TV announcers (FS1): Justin Kutcher, Petros Papadakis & Steve Hutchinson

Scoring summary
1	14:53	MAR	Tiquan Lang 30-yard interception return (Nick Smith kick)	MAR 7–0
1	10:36	PUR	D. J. Knox 4-yard run (Paul Griggs kick)	Tie 7–7
1	6:18	MAR	Devon Johnson 20-yard pass from Michael Birdsong (Nick Smith kick)	MAR 14–7
1	3:00	MAR	Nick Smith 42-yard field goal	MAR 17–7
1	0:38	PUR	Danny Anthrop 9-yard pass from Austin Appleby (Paul Griggs kick)	MAR 17–14
2	7:35	PUR	Austin Appleby 1-yard run (Paul Griggs kick)	PUR 21–17
3	11:47	MAR	Ryan Yurachek 1-yard pass from Michael Birdsong (Nick Smith kick)	MAR 24–21
3	8:33	PUR	Markell Jones 36-yard run (Paul Griggs kick)	PUR 28–24
3	3:37	MAR	Nick Smith 32-yard field goal	PUR 28–27
4	10:14	PUR	Paul Griggs 22-yard field goal	PUR 31–27
4	2:50	MAR	Devon Johnson 6-yard run (Nick Smith kick)	MAR 34–31
4	1:20	MAR	Tiquan Lang 55-yard interception return (Nick Smith kick)	MAR 41–31

Overall record	Previous meeting	Previous winner
1–0	September 29, 2012	Purdue, 51–41

To open the season, Purdue faced the Marshall Thundering Herd.

=== Indiana ===
Indiana Hoosiers (5–6) at Purdue Boilermakers (2–9)

Quarter	1	2	3	4	Total
Indiana	10	14	14	16	54
Purdue	7	7	14	8	36

at Ross-Ade Stadium • West Lafayette, Indiana

- Date: November 28
- Game time: 12:00 p.m. CDT
- Game weather: Overcast • 38 °F (3 °C) • Wind 9 mph (14 km/h) NNE
- Game attendance: 37,152
- Referee: John O'Neill
- TV: Big Ten Network
- Automated ScoreBook

Game information

Indiana

- Nate Sudfeld
  18/29, 350 Yds, 4 TD
- Devine Redding
  22 Rush, 144 Yds, TD
- Mitchell Paige
  5 Rec, 92 Yds, TD

Purdue

- Austin Appleby
  36/57, 332 Yds, 2 TD, 3 INT
- Markell Jones
  16 Rush, 96 Yds, TD
- Danny Anthrop
  9 Rec, 96 Yds

Scoring summary

Quarter	Time	Drive			Team	Scoring information	Score	
Quarter	Time	Plays	Yards	TOP	Team	Scoring information	IND	PUR
1	9:51	10	72	2:53	Indiana	Paige 23-yard touchdown reception from Sudfeld, Oakes kick good	7	0
1	6:01	5	21	1:14	Indiana	45-yard field goal by Oakes	10	0
1	0:00	6	78	1:44	Purdue	Appleby 1-yard touchdown run, Griggs kick good	10	7
2	12:46	7	75	2:14	Indiana	Redding 6-yard touchdown run, Oakes kick good	17	7
2	7:07	14	99	4:12	Indiana	Cobbs 15-yard touchdown reception from Sudfeld, Oakes kick good	24	7
2	3:12	12	75	3:55	Purdue	Jurasevich 11-yard touchdown reception from Appleby, Griggs kick good	24	14
3	13:38	6	75	1:22	Indiana	Sudfeld 3-yard touchdown run, Oakes kick good	31	14
3	4:28	14	76	5:46	Purdue	Herdman 2-yard touchdown reception from Appleby, Griggs kick good	31	21
3	1:57	9	50	2:31	Indiana	Wilson 1-yard touchdown run, Oakes kick good	38	21
3	0:19	6	75	1:38	Purdue	M. Jones 20-yard touchdown run, Griggs kick good	38	28
4	12:22	4	53	1:33	Indiana	Knight 22-yard touchdown reception from Sudfeld, Oakes kick no good	44	28
4	11:21	4	56	1:01	Purdue	Appleby 1-yard touchdown run, 2-point pass good	44	36
4	10:15	3	83	1:06	Indiana	Booker 72-yard touchdown reception from Sudfeld, Oakes kick good	51	36
4	5:31	5	36	0:57	Indiana	34-yard field goal by Oakes	54	36
"TOP" = time of possession. For other American football terms, see Glossary of American football.							54	36

== Roster ==
2015 Purdue Boilermakers football team roster
Players
Coaches
Offense

Pos.	#	Name	Class
RB	1	D. J. Knox	So
TE	2	Jonathan Curry	Jr
QB	2	Elijah Sindelar	Fr
WR	3	Bilal Marshall	Jr
RB	4	Keith Byers II	So
WR	5	Domonique Young	Jr
WR	7	DeAngelo Yancey	Jr
RB	8	Markell Jones	Fr
WR	9	Dan Monteroso	Jr
TE	10	Matt Burke	So
QB	11	David Blough	Fr
QB	12	Austin Appleby	Jr
WR	15	Trae Hart	So
WR	18	Camerson Posey	Jr
QB	19	Aaron Banks	Fr
WR	20	Gregory Phillips	So
WR	21	Anthony Mahoungou	So
RB	23	Keyante Green	So
RB	25	Tario Fuller	Fr
RB	28	David Yancey	So
WR	33	Danny Anthrop (C)	Sr
RB	36	Richie Worship	Fr
RB	45	Lane Beeler	Fr
TE	47	Micah Budzinski	So
OL	51	Bearooz Yacoobi	Fr
OG/C	53	Kirk Barron	Fr
OL	55	Michael Mendez	Fr
C	57	Robert Kugler (C)	Sr
OL	60	Eric Swingler	Fr
OL	64	Dakota Jelinek	Fr
OL	66	Cameron Cermin	Jr
OL	68	Peyton Truitt	Fr
OL	70	Jordan Roos	Jr
OL	71	Corey Clements	Sr
OL	72	Jason King	Jr
OL	73	J. J. Prince	Jr
OL	74	Martesse Patterson	Fr
OT	75	David Heledin	Sr
OL	77	Joey Warburg	Jr
OL	79	Matt McCann	Fr
WR	80	Jarrett Burgess	Fr
WR	81	Keenan Schon	So
WR	82	Alex Hilger	Fr
WR	83	Malcolm Dotson	Fr
TE	84	Jess Trussell	Fr
TE	85	Jordan Jurasevich	Sr
WR	87	Shane Mikesky	Sr
TE	88	Cole Herdman	Fr
TE	89	Brycen Hopkins	Fr

Defense

Pos.	#	Name	Class
S	1	Brandon Roberts	Fr
CB	2	Da'Wan Hunte	So
S	3	Leroy Clark	Jr
LB	4	Ja'Whaun Bentley (C)	So
S	5	Austin Logan	Jr
CB	6	Evyn Cooper	Fr
CB	6	Myles Norwood	So
S	7	Robert Gregory	Jr
S	8	Tim Cason	Fr
CB	9	Anthony Brown	Sr
CB	10	Michael Little	Fr
RE	11	Antoine Miles	So
RE	13	Gelen Robinson	So
DT	14	Ra'Zahn Howard	Jr
S	15	Andy Chelf	Fr
LB	16	Garret Hudson	So
DT	17	Fred Brown	Fr
DT	18	Eddy Wilson	Fr
LB	19	Dezwan Polk-Campbell	So
CB	20	David Rose	Fr
LB	21	Markus Bailey	Fr
LB	22	Sawyer Dawson	Fr
CB	24	Frankie Williams (C)	Sr
CB	25	Antonio Blackmon	Fr
CB	26	Stefan Certa	Sr
S	27	Evan Feichter	So
LB	29	Jimmy Herman	Jr
LB	32	Evan Pulliam	Jr
CB	34	Austin Sullins	Fr
LB	36	Danny Ezechukwu	So
LB	40	Tim Faison	Fr
S	41	Jacob Theineman	Fr
LB	42	Andy James Garcia	Jr
DB	46	Race Johnson	So
DE	47	Shane Henley	Jr
DT	50	Keiwan Jones	Fr
DE	51	John Strauser	So
DT	52	Johnny Daniels	So
DT	54	Jake Replogle	Jr
RE	55	Ryan DeBusk	Jr
LB	56	Wyatt Cook	Fr
DE	59	Langston Newton	Jr
DT	90	Will Colmery	Fr
RE	91	Chazmyn Turner	Fr
DT	92	Ryan Watson	Sr
DE	95	Evan Panfil	Jr
DT	97	Michael Rouse III	Sr
DE	98	Will Schott	Jr

Special teams

Pos.	#	Name	Class
K	30	Thomas Meadows	Sr
K	31	Joe Schopper	Fr
K	37	Paul Griggs	Sr
K	38	Brian Bravo	Fr
K	43	Myles Homan	Fr
LS	48	John Vargyas	Fr
K	49	Tyler Duncan	Fr
LS	65	Ben Makowski	Fr
LS	69	John Bednar	Jr
LS	94	Grant Ellington	Sr
P	96	Jake Herr	Fr

Head coach

- Darrell Hazell

Coordinators/assistant coaches

- Greg Hudson (Defensive Coordinator)
- John Shoop (Offensive Coordinator / Quarterbacks)
- Jim Bridge (Offensive Line)
- Rubin Carter (Defensive Line)
- Marcus Freeman (Linebackers)
- Taver Johnson (Defensive Backs)
- Gerad Parker (Wide Receivers / Recruiting Coordinator)
- Terry Malone (Tight Ends)
- Jafar Williams (Running Backs)
- Doug Boersma (Assistant Athletics Director - Sports Medicine)
- Duane Carlisle (Director of Sports Performance)
- Andrew Warsaw (Director of Football Operations)
- Mike Waugh (Director of Player Personnel)
- John Nussman (Offensive Graduate Assistant)
- Zach Opsal (Defensive Graduate Assistant)
- Mark Sheridan (Defensive Graduate Assistant)
- Camden Wentz (Offensive Graduate Assistant)

Legend

- (C) Team captain
- (S) Suspended
- (I) Ineligible
- Injured
- Redshirt

Roster
Last update: August 28, 2015

== Awards and honors ==
Weekly Awards
Player	Award	Date Awarded	Ref.
David Blough	Big Ten Offensive Player of the Week	November 2, 2015	
Anthony Brown	Big Ten Defensive Player of the Week	November 2, 2015	

== 2016 NFL draft ==
Player	Position	Round	Pick	NFL club
Anthony Brown	Cornerback	6	189	Dallas Cowboys
