= Demetrious =

Demetrious is a given name. Notable people with the given name include:

- Demetrious Cox (born 1994), American football player
- Demetrious Johnson (born 1986), American mixed martial artist
- Demetrious Johnson (American football) (1961-2022), American football player
- Demetrious Maxie (born 1973), Canadian football player

== See also ==
- Demetrious, character from Dragon Ball Z: Bardock – The Father of Goku
