= 2015 Michigan State vs. Michigan football game =

- Conference game
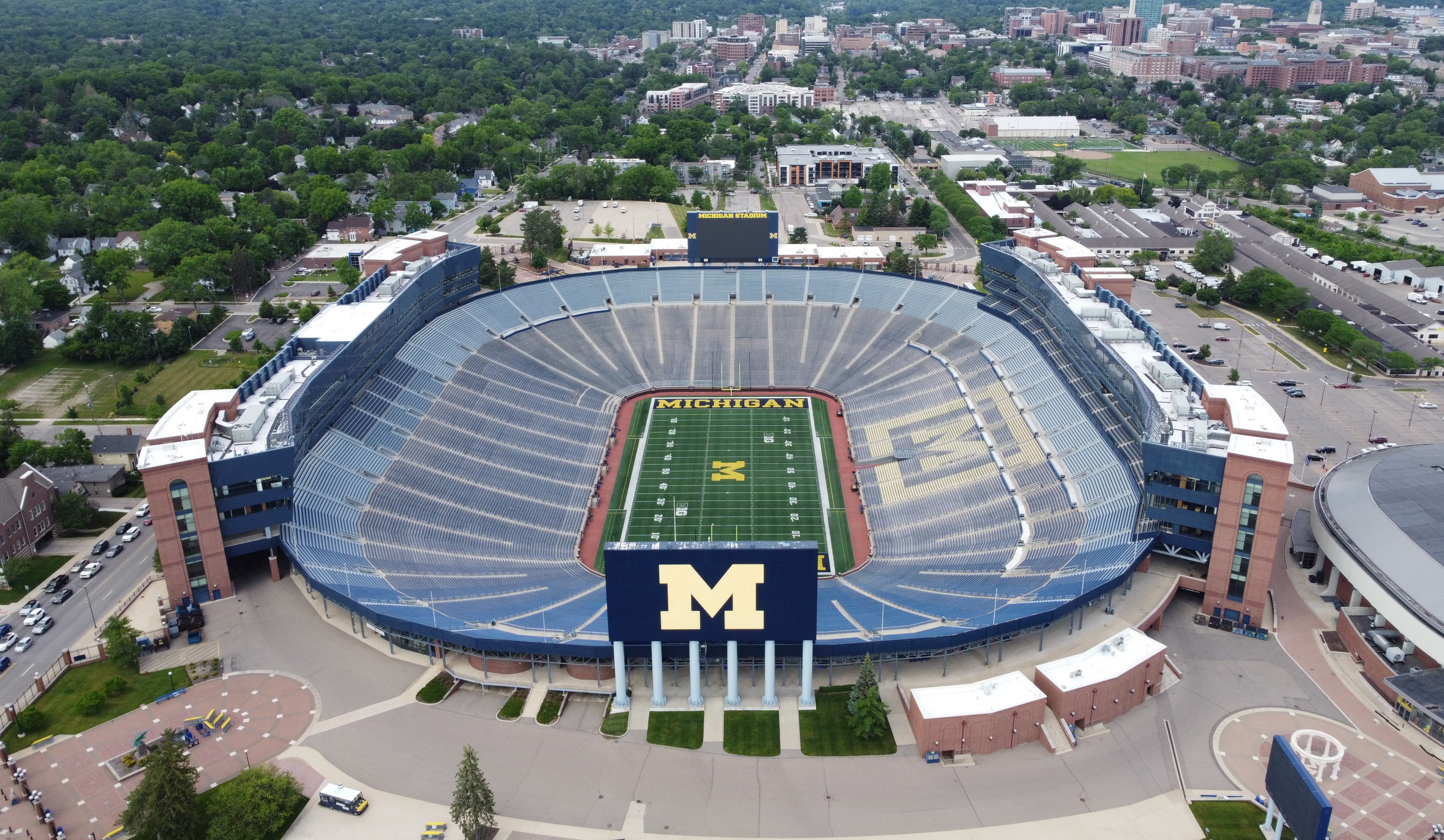
- Michigan Stadium, the site of the game.
Michigan State Spartans	Michigan Wolverines
(6–0)	(5–1)
27	23
Head coach: Mark Dantonio	Head coach: Jim Harbaugh
AP / Coaches; 7 / 4	AP / Coaches; 12 / 14
	1	2	3	4	Total
Michigan State	0	7	7	13	27
Michigan	0	10	10	3	23
- Date: October 17, 2015
- Season: 2015
- Stadium: Michigan Stadium
- Location: Ann Arbor, Michigan
- Favorite: Michigan by 7.5
- Referee: John O'Neill
- Attendance: 111,740

United States TV coverage
- Network: ESPN
- Announcers: Sean McDonough, Chris Spielman, and Todd McShay

On October 17, 2015, the Michigan Wolverines hosted the Michigan State Spartans as part of the Michigan–Michigan State football rivalry. The Spartans defeated the Wolverines 27–23 on the back of a fumble return.

The game was ranked as the 82nd best college football game of all time by ESPN. The game is infamous for the last play, in which Michigan punter Blake O'Neill fumbled the ball, which was picked up by Michigan State for a walk-off touchdown. Due to the TV call by ESPN Announcer Sean McDonough, the game has earned the nickname "Trouble With the Snap".

== Background ==
The two teams had been battling each other in a rivalry since 1898.

=== Michigan ===
After a disappointing 5–7 record in the previous season, the Wolverines fired Brady Hoke as head coach and replaced him with Jim Harbaugh. The team also cleaned out its coaching staff, with 9 out of 12 coaching at the university for the first time. Harbaugh, a former Michigan quarterback under coach Bo Schembechler, had held head coaching gigs for the San Diego Toreros, Stanford Cardinal and the San Francisco 49ers; the latter of which produced three straight NFC championship appearances and one Super Bowl appearance (a 34-31 loss to brother John's Baltimore Ravens at Super Bowl XLVII).

The previous season saw the Wolverines' offense finish 13th in the Big Ten in scoring (20.9 ppg) and total offense (333.0 ypg).

The Wolverines came into the matchup having shutout their last three opponents, and allowing only 6.3 points per game.

=== Michigan State ===
The Spartans came off a 10–2 season that saw them second in the Big Ten Conference, behind eventual CFP champion Ohio State. Their offense ranked second in the Big Ten for scoring (43.1 ppg) and yards per game (496.5), while their defense ranked second in points allowed per game (19.9) and third in yards allowed per game (293.5). They also won their bowl game.

== Broadcasting ==
The game was televised on ESPN and streamed on WatchESPN. The television broadcast became the most watched 3:30 p.m. game in college football history, and the most watched October game in 20 years. The streaming broadcast was the second most streamed regular season game in the history of WatchESPN, which was launched on October 25, 2010.

== Game summary ==
=== First half ===
Michigan State at Michigan

Team	1	2	3	4	Total
• #7 Spartans	0	7	7	13	27
#12 Wolverines	0	10	10	3	23

- Date: October 17
- Location: Michigan Stadium
  Ann Arbor, Michigan
- Game start: 3:35 p.m. EDT
- Elapsed time: 3:46
- Game attendance: 111,740
- Game weather: Mid 40s, Mostly cloudy, NW 12–14 MPH
- Referee: John O'Neill
- TV announcers (ESPN): Sean McDonough, Chris Spielman & Todd McShay

Scoring summary
2	13:13	MICH	Sione Houma 2-yard run (Kenny Allen kick)	MICH 7–0
2	7:06	MSU	LJ Scott 11-yard run (Michael Geiger kick)	Tie 7–7
2	5:34	MICH	Kenny Allen 38-yard field goal	MICH 10–7
3	9:17	MICH	Sione Houma 1-yard run (Kenny Allen kick)	MICH 17–7
3	7:07	MSU	Macgarrett Kings Jr. 30-yard pass from Connor Cook (Michael Geiger kick)	MICH 17–14
3	2:06	MICH	Kenny Allen 21-yard field goal	MICH 20–14
4	9:25	MICH	Kenny Allen 38-yard field goal	MICH 23–14
4	8:56	MSU	LJ Scott 1-yard run (Michael Geiger kick)	MICH 23–21
4	0:00	MSU	Jalen Watts-Jackson 38-yard fumble recovery	MSU 27–23

The Spartans received the opening kickoff for a touchback. The drive was poised to become a 3–and–out before a 27 yard reception to Aaron Burbridge. The drive then stalled out at the Spartans' own 47 yard line, and punted. The Wolverines downed the punt at their own 27 yard line. The Wolverines then failed to convert a first down and punted 80 yards to the Spartans' 2 yard line. The Spartans then immediately began marching down the field on a 16 play drive. They crossed midfield with the aid of a personal foul penalty. They reached the Wolverines' 28 yard line on 4th & 8 and failed to convert and turned the ball over on downs.

The Wolverines' picked up the ball at their own 28 yard line and began an 8 play 72 yard drive that ended in a touchdown to put the Wolverines up 7–0 early in the second quarter. Both teams then traded 3 and outs, before the Spartans' were awarded good field position on their own 46 yard line. Quarterback Connor Cook rushed for 6 yards, and crossed midfield on the back of a personal foul penalty, and were set up at the Wolverines' 24 yard line. The drive culminated in a 11-yard rushing touchdown to end the Wolverines' 212 minute shutout streak. The Wolverines responded with a 5 play 28 yard field goal drive aided by a 49 yard kickoff return. Kenny Allen hit a 38-yard field goal to put the Wolverines up 10–7. Both teams failed to score before the second half.

=== Second half ===
The second half began similarly to the beginning of the first. The Wolverines punted on a three-and-out and the Spartans turned the ball over on downs at their own 38 yard line. Lined up with excellent field position, the Wolverines marched down the field on a 6 play 38 yard drive culminating in a touchdown to put the Wolverines up 17–7. The Spartans responded by driving down the field for a touchdown, aided by a 27 yard completion and a 30 yard touchdown pass to put the Spartans at 14–17. The Wolverines then drove down the field 61 yards to set up a 21 yard field goal, which was completed to put the Wolverines up 20–14.

After three drives stalled out going into the fourth quarter, the Wolverines were poised to score when a punt return brought them to the Spartans' 28 yard line. However, they failed to convert a first down and settled for a 38-yard field goal, which was made to put the Wolverines up 23–14. The Spartans responded with a two play touchdown drive, aided by a 74 yard reception and a 1 yard rushing touchdown to put the Spartans back in contention trailing 21–23 with 8:56 remaining.

After three straight drives ending with punts, the Spartans took over with 4:54 left on their own 28 yard line. After an offsides penalty that put them at their own 33 and a sack that brought them to their 23 yard line, a 2nd & 15 conversion put them at their own 48 yard line. After a few rushing plays, the Spartans ended up at Michigan's 36 with 2:06 on the clock. After a sack, and three straight incompletions, the Spartans turned the ball over on downs with 1:42 on the clock.

The Wolverines began running out the clock, but were unable to convert a first down to put the game away.

=== Final play ===
External videos
- Video of the muffed punt., YouTube

Clinging to their 23–21 lead with 10 seconds left, the Wolverines got set to punt. Long snapper Scott Sypniewski was prepared to snap the ball to punter Blake O'Neill, and the Spartans eschewed a punt returner in order to send an extra player after the kicker. The snap was low, and O'Neill muffed the punt. As he attempted to punt it over his head, O'Neill was hit by defenders and the ball landed in the arms of sophomore safety Jalen Watts-Jackson. Aided by blockers in front, Watts-Jackson was able to rush 38 yards to the end zone for the seemingly impossible game-winning touchdown as he was dragged down after crossing the goal line, giving the Spartans a stunning 27–23 victory.

=== Broadcast calls ===
Whoa, he has trouble with the snap! And the ball is free! It’s picked up by Michigan State’s Jalen Watts-Jackson – and he scores! On the last play of the game! Unbelievable!

— Sean McDonough on ESPN's TV broadcast

Oh, he fumbled the ball! Now he fumbled it up in the air! And it's picked up by Michigan State! At the 20, the 15, the 10, and he's gonna score! No time left, you got to be kidding me. That you could not write. Michigan had the game on the line on the foot. [sic] And Michigan State... wins it with a 37-yard fumble return. On a... punt that is mishandled by Blake O'Neill. I don't know what to say.

— Jim Brandstatter on the Michigan Sports Network radio broadcast

Bad snap, bobbled, scooped up! Here come the Spartans! Down the sideline! Racing into the end zone! Raced on into the end zone is Jalen Watts-Jackson – Touchdown, MSU! Folks, no flags! The Spartans piling on each other in the end zone! It's over! The Spartans win again! The Spartans win again!

— George Blaha on the Michigan State radio broadcast on the Spartan Media Network

== Aftermath ==
As Watts-Jackson fell into the end zone, he suffered a broken hip after ending up at the bottom of a celebratory dogpile, and required surgery.

A fan in the stands suffered a heart attack at the culmination of the game. The fan was hospitalized and eventually recovered. Another fan in the stands, Chris Baldwin, became an internet sensation when his stunned reaction was caught by ESPN’s cameras, which became known as the “surrender cobra”. Michigan State had also given the Paul Bunyan Trophy, a trophy which is given to the winner of any given Michigan–Michigan State game, to Michigan before the end of the game. Television station WZZM in Grand Rapids had begun their post-game report before the ending of the game, declaring Michigan the winner.

Harbaugh met with President Barack Obama the Monday following their loss.

It was a tough way to lose a football game. (Obama) told the fellas to keep their chin up and him and Michelle were watching the game and likes the way our team played and told our guys to keep it going.

McDonough used the phrase "trouble with the snap" twice during the 2022 season, both involving the Wolverines. The first came against Michigan State, this time with the Spartans' punter receiving a poor snap in the fourth quarter as Michigan won 29–7. It appeared again in the Fiesta Bowl when Michigan's offense botched the snap on their last play, resulting in a 51–45 loss to the TCU Horned Frogs; Matt Fortuna of The Athletic quipped that "the only way this could have ended was with Sean McDonough saying 'trouble with the snap' on Michigan's final play." In 2025, McDonough mentioned the line again when the Miami Hurricanes had a bad snap on their 28-yard field goal attempt against the Notre Dame Fighting Irish.
