= Terry Malone =

American football coach and former player

LSU Tigers
- Title: Senior offensive analyst

Personal information
- Born: Buffalo, New York, U.S.

Career information
- College: Holy Cross

Career history
- Arizona (1983–1984) Graduate assistant; Holy Cross (1985) Tight ends coach; Bowling Green (1986–1995) Offensive line/tight ends/offensive coordinator; Boston College (1996) Offensive line coach; Michigan (1997–2000) Offensive line coach; Michigan (2001–2005) Offensive coordinator/offensive line coach; New Orleans Saints (2006–2014) Tight ends coach; Purdue (2015) Tight ends coach; Purdue (2016) Offensive coordinator/tight ends coach; Western Michigan (2017–2018) Running backs coach/director of player development; Bowling Green (2019–2020) Offensive coordinator/offensive line coach; Bowling Green (2021) Offensive coordinator/running backs coach

Awards and highlights
- Super Bowl champion (XLIV); FBS national champion (1997)

Terry Malone is an American football coach.

== Playing career ==
Born in Buffalo, New York and raised in Redford, Michigan, Malone played four seasons as a tight end at Holy Cross, where he was the Crusaders' captain during his senior season. He also earned a bachelor's degree in history.

== Coaching career ==
=== Early coaching career ===
Malone began his coaching career as a graduate assistant at Arizona in 1983 before moving on to his alma mater, Holy Cross, in 1985 to coach tight ends. He served as offensive line coach, tight ends coach, and offensive coordinator at Bowling Green from 1986-1995, where he was a part of two Mid-American Conference championships. He also spent the 1996 season as the offensive line coach at Boston College.

=== Michigan ===
Malone was the offensive line coach at Michigan from 1997 to 2005. He took over the offensive coordinator role in 2002

=== Saints ===
Originally going to the New England Patriots, Malone was hired away by Sean Payton, and became a part of his coaching staff in 2006 and helped the Saints capture their lone Super Bowl title in 2009. He left after the 2014 season.

=== Purdue ===
Malone was hired February 22, 2015, to coach tight ends at Purdue. On Dec. 22, 2015 he was promoted to Offensive Coordinator after the team fired John Shoop. However he only lasted in that role for one season.
