= Keith Dudzinski =

American football player and coach (born 1968)

Current position
- Title: Linebackers coach
- Team: Temple
- Conference: AAC

Biographical details
- Born: November 17, 1968 (age 57); Bridgeport, Connecticut, U.S.

Playing career
- c. 1990: New Haven
- Position: Linebacker

Coaching career (HC unless noted)
- 1991–1993: New Haven (OLB)
- 1994–1997: Brown (DL)
- 1998: UMass (DL)
- 1999–2000: UMass (LB)
- 2001: UMass (DB)
- 2002: Northeastern (LB)
- 2003: Northeastern (DC)
- 2004–2010: UMass (DC)
- 2011–2014: Maryland (ILB)
- 2015: Maryland (DC/ILB)
- 2016–2017: Albany (S)
- 2018–2019: Albany (AHC/co-DC)
- 2020: Michigan (analyst)
- 2021: Arizona (STC/OLB)
- 2022–2024: UMass (DC/LB)
- 2025–present: Temple (LB)

Keith Dudzinski (born November 17, 1968) is an American college football coach and former player. He is the linebackers coach for Temple University. Dudzinski served as the defensive coordinator at the University of Maryland, College Park in 2015.

== Playing career ==
Dudzinski played outside linebacker at the University of New Haven. There he was an All-New England linebacker and served as team captain during his senior season.

== Coaching career ==
Dudzinski's coaching career began at his alma mater in 1991, serving as the team's outside linebackers coach until 1993. In 1994 he joined the Brown Bears staff where he served as the defensive line coach until after the 1997 season. In 1998 he joined the UMass staff as the defensive line coach. In 1999 and 2000 he served as the team’s linebackers coach. In 2001 he coached the team’s defensive backs. In 2002 he went with Don Brown to Northeastern and was named the team’s linebackers coach. In 2003 he was promoted to defensive coordinator. In 2004 he went back to UMass where he served as the team’s defensive coordinator until the end of the 2010 season. In 2011 he joined the Maryland Terps as their inside linebackers coach. In 2015 he was promoted to the team’s defensive coordinator, however he was only in the role for one season. In 2016 he joined the staff at Albany where his son was playing and became the team’s safeties coach. In 2018 he was promoted to assistant head coach and defensive coordinator. In 2020 he worked as a defensive analyst for the Michigan Wolverines. In 2021 he followed Brown once again and became the special team’s coordinator and outside linebackers coach for the Arizona Wildcats. At the end of 2021 he did it again, and followed Brown back to UMass and became the team’s defensive coordinator.

== Personal life ==
Dudzinski and his wife, Katherine, have two daughters, Mary Kathryn and Elizabeth, and a son, Jack, who played offensive line for Albany from 2014 to 2018.
