= Eddy Wilson (American football) =

American football player (born 1997)

Eddy Wilson II
No. 91
- Position: Defensive tackle

Personal information
- Born: February 13, 1997 (age 29); Pontiac, Michigan, U.S.
- Listed height: 6 ft 4 in (1.93 m)
- Listed weight: 295 lb (134 kg)

Career information
- High school: West Bloomfield (MI)
- College: Purdue
- NFL draft: 2018: undrafted

Career history
- Seattle Seahawks (2018)*; Cincinnati Bengals (2018)*; Salt Lake Stallions (2019); Hamilton Tiger-Cats (2019–2021)
- * Offseason or practice squad member only

Eddy Wilson II (born February 13, 1997) is an American former professional football player. He played college football at Purdue.

== Early life ==
Wilson attended West Bloomfield High School in West Bloomfield, Michigan. As a senior, he tallied 72 tackles with 19 sacks. He originally committed to play football for the Bowling Green Falcons but changed his commitment to the Purdue Boilermakers.

== College career ==
Wilson played in nine games in 2015 as a true freshman, recording ten tackles.

In 2016, as a sophomore, Wilson played in ten games, tallying 36 tackles (six for loss) and 2.5 sacks.

As a junior in 2017 Wilson played in 12 of Purdue's 13 games, missing only the 2017 Foster Farms Bowl. In 12 games, he made 27 tackles (2.5 for loss), one sack and two pass breakups. After the season, he declared for the 2018 NFL draft.

== Professional career ==
=== Seattle Seahawks ===
Wilson signed with the Seattle Seahawks as an undrafted free agent on May 4, 2018. He was waived on August 3, 2018.

=== Cincinnati Bengals ===
On August 4, 2018, Wilson was claimed off waivers by the Cincinnati Bengals. He was waived on November 1, 2018.

=== Salt Lake Stallions ===
In 2018, Wilson joined the Salt Lake Stallions of the Alliance of American Football. He was waived on February 27, 2019.

=== Hamilton Tiger-Cats ===
Wilson played in two games for the Hamilton Tiger-Cats of the Canadian Football League in 2019. The 2020 CFL season was cancelled due to the COVID-19 pandemic. He played in seven games for the Tiger-Cats in 2021.
