= Monty Madaris =

American football player (born 1993)

Profile
- Position: Wide receiver

Personal information
- Born: September 8, 1993 (age 33); Cincinnati, Ohio
- Listed height: 6 ft 0 in (1.83 m)
- Listed weight: 196 lb (89 kg)

Career information
- High school: Cincinnati (OH) Moeller
- College: Michigan State
- NFL draft: 2017: undrafted

Career history
- Cincinnati Bengals (2017)*
- * Offseason or practice squad member only

Monty Madaris (born September 8, 1993) is an American former football wide receiver. He played college football at Michigan State, and signed with the Bengals as an undrafted free agent in 2017.

== Professional career ==
Madaris was signed by the Cincinnati Bengals as an undrafted free agent on May 5, 2017. He was placed on the physically unable to perform list on July 29, 2017, after failing his physical. He was waived on August 1, 2017.
