= Tevaun Smith =

Canadian gridiron football player (born 1993)

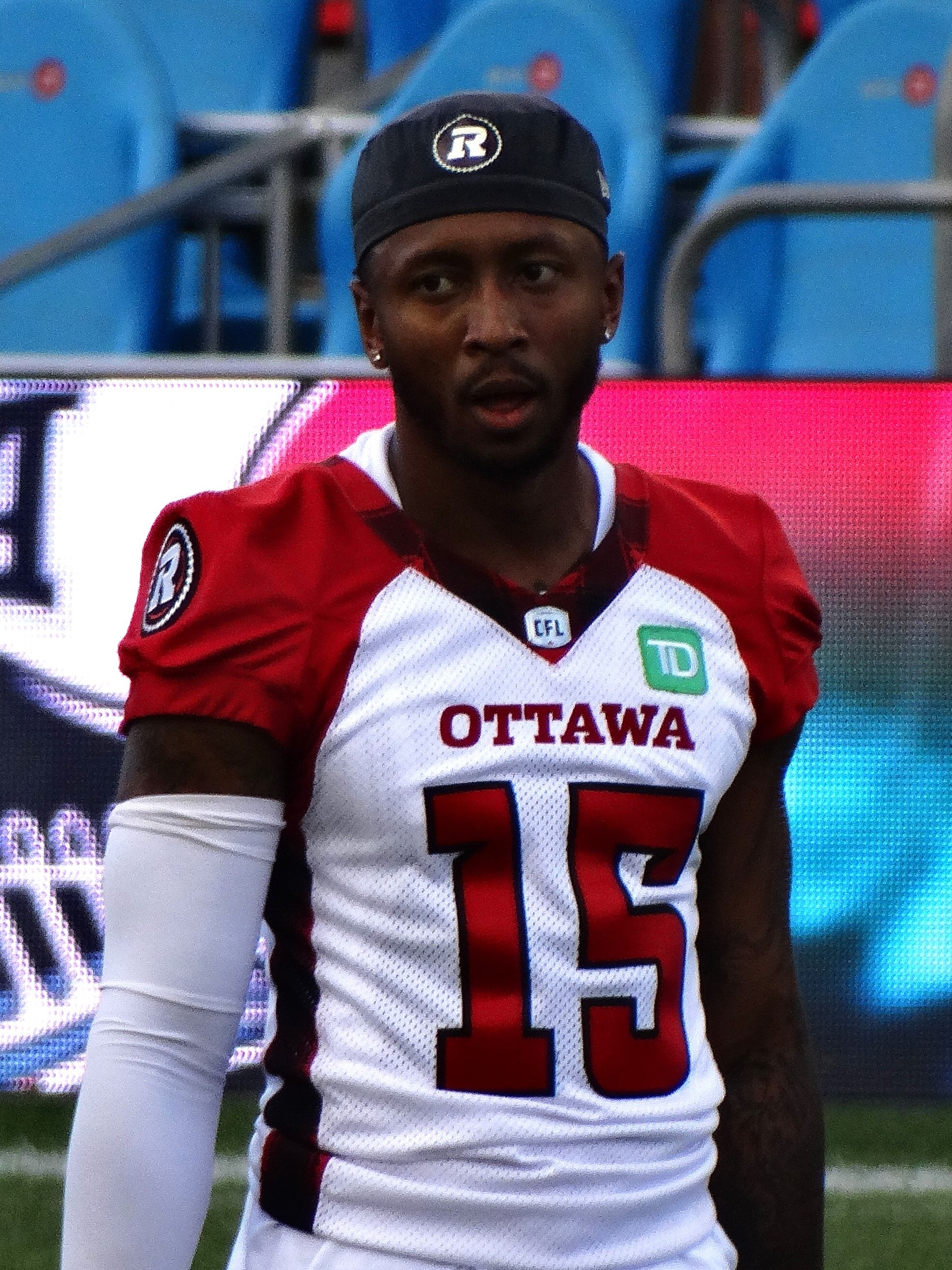
- Smith with the Ottawa Redblacks in 2023

Profile
- Position: Wide receiver

Personal information
- Born: January 30, 1993 (age 33); Toronto, Ontario, Canada
- Listed height: 6 ft 2 in (1.88 m)
- Listed weight: 197 lb (89 kg)

Career information
- High school: Chaminade College (Toronto); Kent School (Kent, Connecticut, U.S.)
- College: Iowa
- CFL draft: 2016: 1st round, 8th overall pick

Career history
- Indianapolis Colts (2016); Oakland Raiders (2017)*; Jacksonville Jaguars (2017–2018)*; Edmonton Eskimos / Elks (2019–2021); Ottawa Redblacks (2022–2023)
- * Offseason or practice squad member only

Career CFL statistics
- Receptions: 82
- Receiving yards: 956
- Receiving touchdowns: 6
- Stats at CFL.ca
- Stats at Pro Football Reference

Tevaun Smith (born January 30, 1993) is a Canadian professional football wide receiver. He played college football at Iowa. Smith has been a member of the Indianapolis Colts, Oakland Raiders, Jacksonville Jaguars, Edmonton Eskimos / Elks, and Ottawa Redblacks.

== Early life and college ==
Smith attended Kent School (class of 2012) in Kent, Connecticut. He spent four seasons with the Iowa Hawkeyes playing in 47 games, catching 102 passes for 1,500 yards accompanied with seven touchdowns.

== Professional career ==
=== Indianapolis Colts ===
Smith signed with the Indianapolis Colts as an undrafted free agent on May 2, 2016. He was released on September 3, 2016, and was signed to the practice squad the next day. He was elevated to the active roster on October 18, 2016. He was released by the Colts on November 8, 2016, and was signed to the practice squad the next day. He signed a reserve/future contract with the Colts on January 2, 2017.

On August 9, 2017, Smith was waived/injured by the Colts and placed on injured reserve. He was released on August 16, 2017.

=== Oakland Raiders ===
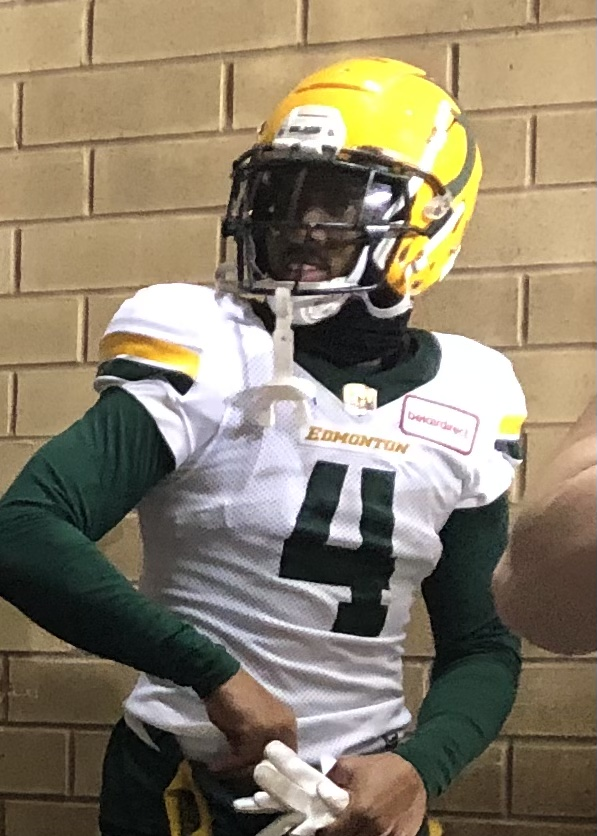
Smith with the Edmonton Elks in 2021

On November 29, 2017, Smith was signed to the Oakland Raiders' practice squad and was released on December 6, 2017.

=== Jacksonville Jaguars ===
On December 26, 2017, Smith was signed to the Jacksonville Jaguars' practice squad. He signed a reserve/future contract with the Jaguars on January 22, 2018. On June 6, 2018, Smith was waived/injured by the Jaguars and was placed on injured reserve. He was released on September 7, 2018.

=== Edmonton Eskimos / Elks ===
On February 11, 2019, Smith signed a two-year contract with the Edmonton Eskimos. The Eskimos had previously drafted him with the 8th-overall pick in the first round of the 2016 CFL draft. In his first season in the league he caught 55 passes for 632 yards with six touchdowns. He signed a contract extension through the 2021 season with Edmonton on December 31, 2020. During the 2021 season, Smith caught 27 passes for 324 yards. Smith was released by the Elks during training camp on May 17, 2022.

=== Ottawa Redblacks ===
On May 21, 2022, it was announced that Smith had signed with the Ottawa Redblacks. In his first year in Ottawa Smith played in eight games and caught 14 passes for 142 yards with two touchdowns. On February 2, 2023, Smith and the Redblacks agreed to a one-year contract extension. He became a free agent after the 2023 season.
