= Aaron Burbridge =

American football player (born 1993)

No. 13
- Position: Wide receiver

Personal information
- Born: December 23, 1993 (age 32); Detroit, Michigan, U.S.
- Listed height: 6 ft 0 in (1.83 m)
- Listed weight: 206 lb (93 kg)

Career information
- High school: Harrison (Farmington Hills, Michigan)
- College: Michigan State
- NFL draft: 2016: 6th round, 213th overall pick

Career history
- San Francisco 49ers (2016–2018); Denver Broncos (2019)*
- * Offseason or practice squad member only

Awards and highlights
- Big Ten Receiver of the Year (2015); First-team All-Big Ten (2015)

Career NFL statistics
- Receptions: 7
- Receiving yards: 88
- Stats at Pro Football Reference

Aaron Burbridge (born December 23, 1993) is an American former professional football player who was a wide receiver in the National Football League (NFL). He played college football for the Michigan State Spartans, and was selected by the San Francisco 49ers in the sixth round of the 2016 NFL draft.

== Early life ==
Burbridge attended Harrison High School in Farmington Hills, Michigan. He was rated by Rivals.com as a four-star recruit and committed to Michigan State University to play college football.

== College career ==
As a true freshman at Michigan State in 2012, Burbridge played in 11 games with seven starts and recorded 29 receptions for 364 yards and two touchdowns. He had 22 receptions for 194 yards as a sophomore in 2013 and 29 receptions for 358 yards and one touchdown as a junior in 2014. Burbridge became Michigan State's number one receiver in 2015. He was named the Big Ten Conference wide receiver of the year in 2015.

=== College statistics ===
Year	Team	Games		Receiving				Rushing			
Year	Team	GP	GS	Rec	Yards	Avg	TD	Att	Yards	Avg	TD
2012	Michigan State	11	7	29	364	12.6	2	1	4	4.0	0
2013	Michigan State	13	0	22	194	8.8	0	4	62	15.5	0
2014	Michigan State	13	2	29	358	12.3	1	8	39	4.9	0
2015	Michigan State	14	14	85	1,258	14.8	7	9	44	4.9	0
Career		51	23	165	2,174	13.2	10	22	149	6.8	0

== Professional career ==
=== San Francisco 49ers ===
Burbridge was selected by the San Francisco 49ers in the sixth round, 213th overall, in the 2016 NFL draft.

On September 2, 2017, Burbridge was placed on injured reserve.

On September 1, 2018, Burbridge was waived/injured by the 49ers and was placed on injured reserve. He was released on September 12, 2018. He was re-signed to the practice squad on October 23, 2018. He was released on November 1, 2018.

=== Denver Broncos ===
On January 24, 2019, Burbridge signed a reserve/future contract with the Denver Broncos. He announced his retirement from the NFL on July 17, 2019.
