= Demetrious Cox =

American football player (born 1994)

No. 37
- Position: Safety

Personal information
- Born: April 20, 1994 (age 32); Jeannette, Pennsylvania, U.S.
- Listed height: 6 ft 0 in (1.83 m)
- Listed weight: 200 lb (91 kg)

Career information
- High school: Jeannette
- College: Michigan State
- NFL draft: 2017: undrafted

Career history
- Cincinnati Bengals (2017)*; Carolina Panthers (2017); Arizona Cardinals (2018)*; Cincinnati Bengals (2018–2019)*; New York Guardians (2020); Winnipeg Blue Bombers (2021)*
- * Offseason or practice squad member only

Awards and highlights
- Third-team All-Big Ten (2015)

Career NFL statistics
- Total tackles: 4
- Stats at Pro Football Reference

Demetrious Cox (born April 20, 1994) is an American former professional football player who was a safety in the National Football League (NFL). He played college football for the Michigan State Spartans, and signed with the Cincinnati Bengals as an undrafted free agent in 2017.

== Early life ==
Cox played high school football at Jeannette Senior High School in Jeannette, Pennsylvania, and was a three-year starter. He completed 55 of 88 passes for 698 yards and 4 touchdowns while also rushing for 621 yards and 12 touchdowns his junior year in 2010. He also recorded 55 tackles and 3 interceptions in 2010. Cox completed 62 of 106 passes for 910 yards and 9 touchdowns while also rushing for 1,263 yards and 22 touchdowns his senior year in 2011. He also recorded 63 tackles and 3 interceptions, including one that was returned for a touchdown, in 2011. Jeannette had a 12–1 record and advanced to the state championship game in 2011. He was named an All-American by SuperPrep, MaxPreps and PrepStar. Cox also played basketball at Jeannette and scored over 1,000 career points. He averaged 18 points per game his junior season, earning All-Conference honors.

== College career ==
At Michigan State University, Cox was a four-year letterman for the Spartans from 2013 to 2016. He was redshirted in 2012.

He played in 14 games in 2013, recording 3 solo tackles and 3 tackle assists. He played in 13 games, starting 1, in 2014, totaling 19 solo tackles, 7 tackle assists, 1 sack, 2 pass breakups, 1 forced fumble and 1 fumble recovery. His one start was at cornerback. Cox played in 14 games, all starts, in 2015, recording 48 solo tackles, 31 tackle assists, 7 pass breakups, 3 interceptions and 1 fumble recovery which was returned for a touchdown. He started eight games at cornerback and six at safety. He was named Third-team All-Big Ten by the coaches and Honorable Mention All-Big Ten by the media. Cox played in ten games, all starts at free safety, in 2016, totaling 21 solo tackles, 34 tackle assists, 5 pass breakups and 1 interception which was returned for a touchdown. He was one of three team captains in 2016.

He played in 51 games, starting 25, during his college career, recording 91 solo tackles, 75 tackle assists, 1 sack, 14 pass breakups, 4 interceptions, 1 forced fumbled, 2 fumble recoveries and 2 touchdowns. He graduated from Michigan State in May 2016 with a bachelor's degree in interdisciplinary studies in social science.

== Professional career ==
Cox was rated the 12th best free safety in the 2017 NFL draft by NFLDraftScout.com.

Pre-draft measurables
Height	Weight	40-yard dash	10-yard split	20-yard split	20-yard shuttle	Three-cone drill	Vertical jump	Broad jump	Bench press
6 ft 0 in (1.83 m)	200 lb (91 kg)	4.55 s	1.57 s	2.61 s	4.33 s	7.02 s	34 in (0.86 m)	10 ft 4 in (3.15 m)	26 reps
All values from Michigan State Pro Day

Cox signed with the Cincinnati Bengals as an undrafted free agent on May 5, 2017. He was waived on September 2, 2017.

On September 3, 2017, Cox was claimed off waivers by the Carolina Panthers. He was placed on injured reserve on October 24, 2017, with an ankle injury. On August 31, 2018, Cox was waived by the Panthers.

On September 3, 2018, Cox was signed to the Arizona Cardinals' practice squad. He was released on October 2, 2018.

On October 10, 2018, Cox was signed to the Bengals practice squad. He signed a reserve/future contract with the Bengals on December 31, 2018. He was waived during final roster cuts on August 30, 2019.

Cox was selected in the 5th round during phase four in the 2020 XFL draft by the New York Guardians. He had his contract terminated when the league suspended operations on April 10, 2020.

Cox signed with the Winnipeg Blue Bombers of the CFL on January 15, 2021. He was released on June 18, 2021.
