= 2015 Foster Farms Bowl =

- 14th San Francisco Bowl
UCLA Bruins	Nebraska Cornhuskers
(8–4)	(5–7)
Pac-12	Big Ten
29	37
Head coach: Jim L. Mora	Head coach: Mike Riley
	1	2	3	4	Total
UCLA	7	14	0	8	29
Nebraska	7	14	9	7	37
- Date: December 26, 2015
- Season: 2015
- Stadium: Levi's Stadium
- Location: Santa Clara, California
- MVP: Offense: Tommy Armstrong (Nebraska); Defense: Jaleel Wadood (UCLA)
- Favorite: UCLA by 6.5
- Referee: Ron Cherry (ACC)
- Attendance: 33,527

United States TV coverage
- Network: ESPN / ESPN Radio
- Announcers: Jason Benetti, Rod Gilmore, Shelley Smith (ESPN); Bill Rosinski, David Norrie, Joe Schad (ESPN Radio)

The 2015 San Francisco Bowl, known as the Foster Farms Bowl for sponsorship purposes, was the fourteenth edition of the college football bowl game, played on December 26, 2015, at Levi's Stadium in Santa Clara, California. Part of the 2015–16 bowl season, it featured the UCLA Bruins of the Pac-12 and the Nebraska Cornhuskers of the Big Ten.

== Teams ==
Despite winning only five games in the regular season, Nebraska was invited to play in a bowl based on its Academic Progress Rate as there were not enough eligible teams to fill all 82 spots. The 2015 San Francisco Bowl was the thirteenth all-time and first postseason meeting between Nebraska and UCLA, with the series tied 6–6 prior to the game.

== Game ==
UCLA, favored by a touchdown, methodically marched down the field to take a 7–0 lead on its opening drive. The Cornhuskers answered with a twelve-play drive to tie the game, but could not slow down the Bruins offense for much of the first half. Midway through the second quarter, Tommy Armstrong lost a fumble in the red zone, and UCLA quarterback Josh Rosen delivered two quick touchdown drives of 86 and 68 yards to give the Bruins a 21–7 lead.

Nebraska mounted two run-heavy drives to tie the game at 21 with less than a minute remaining in the half. On the ensuing drive, Nebraska safety Nate Gerry was ejected for targeting, though both coaches agreed the play should not have been penalized.

The Cornhuskers maintained control to start the second half, holding UCLA to a single yard of offense on six plays in the third quarter. It allowed NU to extend its lead to nine points, which became sixteen less than a minute into the fourth quarter when a three-yard Armstrong touchdown brought the Nebraska run to thirty unanswered points. Rosen led a quick touchdown drive and a successful two-point conversion to make it a one-possession game; UCLA drove into NU territory twice more as time wound down, but came away scoreless after a missed field goal and an interception, allowing Nebraska to run out the clock on a 37–29 victory.

=== Scoring summary ===
Qtr	Time	Drive			Team	Detail	Score	
Qtr	Time	Plays	Yards	TOP	Team	Detail	UCLA	NU
1	10:17	10	79	4:43	UCLA	Paul Perkins 1-yd run (Kaʻimi Fairbairn kick)	7	0
1	3:50	12	75	6:27	NU	Imani Cross 1-yd run (Drew Brown kick)	7	7
2	11:04	4	86	1:38	UCLA	Kenneth Walker 60-yd pass from Josh Rosen (Fairbairn kick)	14	7
2	7:55	4	68	1:36	UCLA	Nate Starks 26-yd pass from Rosen (Fairbairn kick)	21	7
2	6:23	4	75	1:23	NU	Terrell Newby 3-yd run (Brown kick)	21	14
2	0:52	8	73	3:31	NU	Andy Janovich 1-yd run (Brown kick)	21	21
3	10:37	9	78	4:23	NU	Stanley Morgan 22-yd pass from Tommy Armstrong (kick failed)	21	27
3	4:50	11	67	4:32	NU	Brown 20-yd field goal	21	30
4	14:11	9	51	4:01	NU	Armstrong 3-yd run (Brown kick)	21	37
4	11:29	8	76	2:35	UCLA	Jordan Payton 9-yd pass from Rosen (Rosen pass to Thomas Duarte)	29	37

=== Team statistics ===
Statistic	UCLA	Nebraska
First downs	17	31
Rushes–yards	16–67	62–326
Comp.–att.–yards	26–41–319	12–19–174
Total offense	386	500
Turnovers	2	1
Punts–average	4–41.8	3–41.7
Penalties–yards	7–56	6–38
Time of possession	21:45	38:15

== Starting lineups ==
UCLA	Position		Nebraska
Offense
4 Darren Andrews	WR	TE	11 Cethan Carter
18 Thomas Duarte	WR	TE	84 Sam Cotton
6 Stephen Johnson	WR		7 Taariq Allen
9 Jordan Payne	WR		10 Jamal Turner
3 Josh Rosen	QB		4 Tommy Armstrong
24 Paul Perkins	RB		32 Imani Cross
68 Conor McDermott	LT		71 Alex Lewis
72 Christian Garcia	LG		66 Dylan Utter
54 Jake Brendel	C		65 Ryne Reeves
74 Caleb Benenoch	RG		58 Zach Sterup
77 Kolton Miller	RT		68 Nick Gates
Defense
97 Kenny Clark	NT	DT	7 Maliek Collins
98 Takkarist McKinley	DT		98 Vincent Valentine
96 Eli Ankou	DE		95 Jack Gangwish
	DE		90 Greg McMullen
12 Jayon Brown	LB		52 Josh Banderas
42 Kenny Young	LB		15 Michael Rose
58 Deon Hollins	OLB		
51 Aaron Wallace	OLB		
3 Randall Goforth	S		28 Byerson Cockrell
2 Jaleel Wadood	S		25 Nate Gerry
	S		24 Aaron Williams
1 Ishmael Adams	CB		8 Chris Jones
7 John Johnson	CB		10 Joshua Kalu
