= 2015 Nebraska Cornhuskers football team =

American college football season

2015 Nebraska Cornhuskers football

Foster Farms Bowl champion

Foster Farms Bowl, W 37–29 vs. UCLA
- Conference: Big Ten Conference
- West Division
- Record: 6–7 (3–5 Big Ten)
- Head coach: Mike Riley (1st season)
- Offensive coordinator: Danny Langsdorf (1st season)
- Offensive scheme: Multiple
- Defensive coordinator: Mark Banker (1st season)
- Base defense: 4–3
- Home stadium: Memorial Stadium

2015 Big Ten Conference football standings
	Conf.			Overall
Team	W		L	W		L
East Division
No. 6 Michigan State xy$^	7	–	1	12	–	2
No. 4 Ohio State x	7	–	1	12	–	1
No. 12 Michigan	6	–	2	10	–	3
Penn State	4	–	4	7	–	6
Indiana	2	–	6	6	–	7
Rutgers	1	–	7	4	–	8
Maryland	1	–	7	3	–	9
West Division
No. 9 Iowa xy	8	–	0	12	–	2
No. 23 Northwestern	6	–	2	10	–	3
No. 21 Wisconsin	6	–	2	10	–	3
Nebraska	3	–	5	6	–	7
Minnesota	2	–	6	6	–	7
Illinois	2	–	6	5	–	7
Purdue	1	–	7	2	–	10
Championship: Michigan State 16, Iowa 13
^ – College Football Playoff participant; $ – Conference champion; x – Division champion/co-champions; y – Championship game participant; Rankings from AP Poll

The 2015 Nebraska Cornhuskers football team represented the University of Nebraska in the 2015 NCAA Division I FBS football season. The team was coached by first-year head coach Mike Riley and played their home games at Memorial Stadium in Lincoln, Nebraska. They were members of the West Division of the Big Ten Conference.

Nebraska struggled with many close losses in the 2015 season and finished the regular season with a 5–7 overall record, but was able to hand a playoff-bound and Big Ten champion Michigan State team their only loss of the regular season. Nebraska still qualified for a bowl game, one of three teams to do so with a 5–7 record (the others being in-conference rival Minnesota and San Jose State). This was due to the lack of six-wins teams to fill the 80 bowl slots in the FBS and because of their APR score in relation to other FBS teams that also had a 5–7 record. The Huskers took on the UCLA Bruins in the Foster Farms Bowl in Santa Clara, California and won 37–29 to end the season with a 6–7 record.

== Before the season ==
=== Recruiting ===
==== Scholarship recruits ====
College recruiting
Name	Hometown	School	Height	Weight	40^{‡}	Commit date
Alston, Lavan; WR	Ventura, CA	St. Bonaventure	5 ft 11 in (1.80 m)	173 lb (78 kg)	4.43	Jan 31, 2015
Alston, Lavan; WR	Recruit ratings: Scout: Rivals: 247Sports: ESPN: (78)					
Anderson, Avery; CB	Colorado Springs, CO	Pine Creek	6 ft 0 in (1.83 m)	170 lb (77 kg)	–	Feb 2, 2014
Anderson, Avery; CB	Recruit ratings: Scout: Rivals: 247Sports: ESPN: (80)					
Barnett, Jalin; OG	Lawton, OK	Lawton	6 ft 3 in (1.91 m)	303 lb (137 kg)	5.2	Jan 14, 2015
Barnett, Jalin; OG	Recruit ratings: Scout: Rivals: 247Sports: ESPN: (84)					
Barry, Mohamed; LB	Loganville, GA	Grayson	6 ft 1 in (1.85 m)	210 lb (95 kg)	4.50	Jan 29, 2015
Barry, Mohamed; LB	Recruit ratings: Scout: Rivals: 247Sports: ESPN: (76)					
Davis, Alex; DE	West Palm Beach, FL	Dwyer	6 ft 5 in (1.96 m)	225 lb (102 kg)	–	Feb 1, 2015
Davis, Alex; DE	Recruit ratings: Scout: Rivals: 247Sports: ESPN: (NR)					
Davis, Carlos; DT	Blue Springs, MO	Blue Springs	6 ft 3 in (1.91 m)	270 lb (120 kg)	–	Mar 1, 2014
Davis, Carlos; DT	Recruit ratings: Scout: Rivals: 247Sports: ESPN: (80)					
Davis, Khalil; DT	Blue Springs, MO	Blue Springs	6 ft 3 in (1.91 m)	270 lb (120 kg)	–	Mar 1, 2014
Davis, Khalil; DT	Recruit ratings: Scout: Rivals: 247Sports: ESPN: (77)					
Decker, Michael; OG	Omaha, NE	Omaha North	6 ft 4 in (1.93 m)	288 lb (131 kg)	5.3	Apr 9, 2014
Decker, Michael; OG	Recruit ratings: Scout: Rivals: 247Sports: ESPN: (77)					
Ferguson, Tyrin; LB	New Orleans, LA	Edna Karr	6 ft 2 in (1.88 m)	210 lb (95 kg)	–	Dec 6, 2014
Ferguson, Tyrin; LB	Recruit ratings: Scout: Rivals: 247Sports: ESPN: (76)					
Gaylord, Christian; OT	Baldwin City, KS	Baldwin	6 ft 7 in (2.01 m)	290 lb (130 kg)	5.1	Feb 3, 2014
Gaylord, Christian; OT	Recruit ratings: Scout: Rivals: 247Sports: ESPN: (78)					
Lee, Eric; CB	Highlands Ranch, CO	Valor Christian	5 ft 11 in (1.80 m)	184 lb (83 kg)	–	Feb 1, 2014
Lee, Eric; CB	Recruit ratings: Scout: Rivals: 247Sports: ESPN: (82)					
Morgan Jr., Stanley; WR	New Orleans, LA	St. Augustine	6 ft 0 in (1.83 m)	185 lb (84 kg)	–	Nov 7, 2014
Morgan Jr., Stanley; WR	Recruit ratings: Scout: Rivals: 247Sports: ESPN: (81)					
Neal, DaiShon; DE	Omaha, NE	Omaha Central	6 ft 7 in (2.01 m)	245 lb (111 kg)	4.8	Apr 9, 2014
Neal, DaiShon; DE	Recruit ratings: Scout: Rivals: 247Sports: ESPN: (75)					
Ober, Jordan; LS	Las Vegas, NV	Bishop Gorman	6 ft 1 in (1.85 m)	200 lb (91 kg)	4.8	Feb 1, 2015
Ober, Jordan; LS	Recruit ratings: Scout: Rivals: 247Sports: ESPN: (NR)					
Ozigbo, Devine; RB	Sachse, TX	Sachse	5 ft 11 in (1.80 m)	220 lb (100 kg)	4.7	Jan 9, 2015
Ozigbo, Devine; RB	Recruit ratings: Scout: Rivals: 247Sports: ESPN: (78)					
Reed, Antonio; S	Southaven, MS	Southaven	6 ft 2 in (1.88 m)	220 lb (100 kg)	4.5	Apr 9, 2014
Reed, Antonio; S	Recruit ratings: Scout: Rivals: 247Sports: ESPN: (NR)					
Snyder, Matt; TE	San Ramon, CA	California	6 ft 5 in (1.96 m)	245 lb (111 kg)	–	Dec 30, 2014
Snyder, Matt; TE	Recruit ratings: Scout: Rivals: 247Sports: ESPN: (76)					
Stevenson, Jordan; RB	Dallas, TX	South Oak Cliff	5 ft 8 in (1.73 m)	210 lb (95 kg)	–	Jul 30, 2015
Stevenson, Jordan; RB	Recruit ratings: Scout: Rivals: 247Sports: ESPN: (80)					
Talan, Adrienne; LB	Pembroke Pines, FL	Flanagan	6 ft 1 in (1.85 m)	205 lb (93 kg)	4.5	Feb 4, 2015
Talan, Adrienne; LB	Recruit ratings: Scout: Rivals: 247Sports: ESPN: (72)					
Williams, Aaron; S	Atlanta, GA	Carver	6 ft 0 in (1.83 m)	185 lb (84 kg)	–	May 15, 2014
Williams, Aaron; S	Recruit ratings: Scout: Rivals: 247Sports: ESPN: (78)					
Young, Dedrick; RB	Peoria, AZ	Centennial	6 ft 1 in (1.85 m)	220 lb (100 kg)	–	Dec 15, 2014
Young, Dedrick; RB	Recruit ratings: Scout: Rivals: 247Sports: ESPN: (76)					
Overall recruit ranking: Scout: 33 Rivals: 31 ESPN: 31
‡ Refers to 40-yard dash; Note: In many cases, Scout, Rivals, 247Sports, On3, and ESPN may conflict in their listings of height, weight and 40 time.; In these cases, the average was taken. ESPN grades are on a 100-point scale.; Sources: "Yahoo Sports: Rivals.com 2015 Nebraska Commitments". Rivals.; "Scout.com 2015 Nebraska Commitments". Scout.; "ESPN 2015 Nebraska Commitments". ESPN.; "Scout.com Team Recruiting Rankings". Scout.; "2015 Team Ranking". Rivals.com.

==== Walk-on recruits ====
College recruiting
Name	Hometown	School	Height	Weight	Commit date
Anderson, Fyn; OT	Lincoln, NE	Lincoln Southeast	6 ft 3 in (1.91 m)	247 lb (112 kg)	
Anderson, Fyn; OT	Recruit ratings: Scout: Rivals: 247Sports: ESPN:				
Brugmann, Jared; LB	Gretna, NE	Gretna	6 ft 2 in (1.88 m)	225 lb (102 kg)	
Brugmann, Jared; LB	Recruit ratings: Scout: Rivals: 247Sports: ESPN:				
Cleveland, Brody; LB	Ogallala, NE	Ogallala	6 ft 2 in (1.88 m)	210 lb (95 kg)	
Cleveland, Brody; LB	Recruit ratings: Scout: Rivals: 247Sports: ESPN:				
Hemphill, Austin; FB	Gretna, NE	Gretna	6 ft 0 in (1.83 m)	220 lb (100 kg)	
Hemphill, Austin; FB	Recruit ratings: Scout: Rivals: 247Sports: ESPN:				
Karel, Reid; QB	Seward, NE	Seward	6 ft 3 in (1.91 m)	190 lb (86 kg)	
Karel, Reid; QB	Recruit ratings: Scout: Rivals: 247Sports: ESPN:				
Johnson, Noah; RB	Sutton, NE	Sutton	6 ft 0 in (1.83 m)	195 lb (88 kg)	
Johnson, Noah; RB	Recruit ratings: Scout: Rivals: 247Sports: ESPN:				
Mazour, Wyatt; ATH	Albion, NE	Boone Central	5 ft 9 in (1.75 m)	190 lb (86 kg)	
Mazour, Wyatt; ATH	Recruit ratings: Scout: Rivals: 247Sports: ESPN:				
Weinmaster, Jacob; LB	Loveland, CO	Loveland	6 ft 0 in (1.83 m)	200 lb (91 kg)	
Weinmaster, Jacob; LB	Recruit ratings: Scout: Rivals: 247Sports: ESPN:				
Young, Conor; ATH	Cozad, NE	Cozad	6 ft 1 in (1.85 m)	170 lb (77 kg)	
Young, Conor; ATH	Recruit ratings: Scout: Rivals: 247Sports: ESPN:				
Overall recruit ranking:
Note: In many cases, Scout, Rivals, 247Sports, On3, and ESPN may conflict in their listings of height and weight.; In these cases, the average was taken. ESPN grades are on a 100-point scale.; Sources: "2015 Team Ranking". Rivals.com.

== Schedule ==
Date	Time	Opponent	Site	TV	Result	Attendance	Source
September 5	2:30 p.m.	BYU*	Memorial Stadium; Lincoln, NE	ABC	L 28–33	89,959	
September 12	7:00 p.m.	South Alabama*	Memorial Stadium; Lincoln, NE	BTN	W 48–9	89,822	
September 19	2:30 p.m.	at Miami (FL)*	Sun Life Stadium; Miami Gardens, FL (rivalry)	ABC/ESPN2	L 33–36 ^{OT}	53,580	
September 26	11:00 a.m.	Southern Miss*^{†}	Memorial Stadium; Lincoln, NE	ESPNews	W 36–28	89,899	
October 3	3:00 p.m.	at Illinois	Memorial Stadium; Champaign, IL	BTN	L 13–14	40,138	
October 10	2:30 p.m.	Wisconsin	Memorial Stadium; Lincoln, NE (Freedom Trophy)	ABC/ESPN2	L 21–23	89,886	
October 17	2:30 p.m.	at Minnesota	TCF Bank Stadium; Minneapolis, MN (rivalry)	ESPN2	W 48–25	54,062	
October 24	11:00 a.m.	Northwestern	Memorial Stadium; Lincoln, NE	ESPN2	L 28–30	89,493	
October 31	11:00 a.m.	at Purdue	Ross–Ade Stadium; West Lafayette, IN	ESPNU	L 45–55	31,351	
November 7	6:00 p.m.	No. 6 Michigan State	Memorial Stadium; Lincoln, NE	ESPN	W 39–38	90,094	
November 14	2:30 p.m.	at Rutgers	High Point Solutions Stadium; Piscataway, NJ	BTN	W 31–14	45,606	
November 27	2:30 p.m.	No. 3 Iowa	Memorial Stadium; Lincoln, NE (Heroes Game)	ABC	L 20–28	90,830	
December 26	8:15 p.m.	UCLA*	Levi's Stadium; Santa Clara, CA (Foster Farms Bowl)	ESPN	W 37–29	33,527	
*Non-conference game; ^{†}Homecoming; Rankings from AP Poll released prior to the game; All times are in Central time

== Personnel ==
2015 Nebraska Cornhuskers football team roster
Players
Coaches
Offense

Pos.	#	Name	Class
WR	7	Taariq Allen	Sr
WR	3	Lavan Alston	Fr
QB	4	Tommy Armstrong Jr. (C)	Jr
WR	33	Christian Bailey	So
OL	74	Jalin Barnett	Fr
WR	40	Ty Betka	Jr
QB	9	Tyson Broekemeier	Sr
QB	6	AJ Bush	RFr
TE	11	Cethan Carter	Jr
WR	43	Brett Classen	So
OL	62	Cole Conrad	RFr
TE	84	Sam Cotton	Jr
IB	32	Imani Cross	Sr
QB	2	Zack Darlington	RFr
OL	79	Michael Decker	Fr
OL	63	Tanner Farmer	RFr
OL	67	Jerald Foster	RFr
TE	42	Trey Foster	Jr
OL	51	Ryan Freudenburg	RFr
QB	17	Ryker Fyfe	Jr
OL	68	Nick Gates	RFr
OL	56	Christian Gaylord	Fr
OL	73	Sam Hahn	Jr
OL	72	Zach Hannon	So
FB	49	Austin Hemphill	Fr
WR	25	Blake Holtmeier	RFr
TE	88	Tyler Hoppes	So
WR	13	Lane Hovey	Jr
FB	35	Andy Janovich	Sr
OL	76	Dwayne Johnson Jr.	So
RB	27	Noah Johnson	Fr
FB	38	Harrison Jordan	So
ATH	36	Reid Karel	Fr
TE	89	Connor Ketter	So
FB	30	Bo Kitrell	RFr
OL	77	David Knevel	So
OL	70	Chongo Kondolo	Sr
OL	71	Alex Lewis (C)	Sr
OL	75	Chris Long	Sr
RB	37	Wyatt Mazour	Fr
FB	44	Mitch McCann	Jr
TE	41	Luke McNitt	So
WR	82	Alonzo Moore	Jr
WR	8	Stanley Morgan Jr.	Fr
IB	29	Graham Nabity	Jr
IB	39	Jordan Nelson	Jr
IB	34	Terrell Newby	Jr
RB	22	Devine Ozigbo	Fr
OL	54	Robby Painter	Jr
WR	26	Brady Pelzer	RFr
WR	15	De'Mornay Pierson-El	So
WR	48	Gabe Rahn	So
OL	65	Ryne Reeves	Sr
WR	87	Brandon Reilly	Jr
TE	45	Bryan Reimers	RFr
IB	23	Austin Rose	RFr
TE	85	Matt Snyder	Fr
OL	57	Zach Sterup	Sr
IB	2	Jordan Stevenson	Fr
TE	86	David Sutton	Sr
IB	28	Adam Taylor	So
OL	55	Paul Thurston	Jr
WR	10	Jamal Turner	Sr
OL	66	Dylan Utter	Jr
WR	1	Jordan Westerkamp (C)	Jr
OL	58	Corey Whitaker	Jr
IB	21	Mikale Wilbon	RFr
WR	31	Conor Young	Fr

Defense

Pos.	#	Name	Class
DE	91	Freedom Akinmoladun	RFr
DB	4	Avery Anderson	Fr
DL	75	Fyn Anderson	Fr
LB	52	Josh Banderas	Jr
LB	18	Mohamed Barry	Fr
LB	53	Alex Boryca	RFr
LB	51	Jared Brugmann	Fr
LB	59	Brody Cleveland	Fr
S	28	Byerson Cockrell	Sr
DT	7	Maliek Collins (C)	Jr
LB	26	Thomas Connely	RFr
CB	23	Daniel Davie	Sr
DE	32	Alex Davis	Fr
DL	96	Carlos Davis	Fr
DL	94	Khalil Davis	Fr
DE	88	Ross Dzuris	Jr
DE	48	Erik Evans	So
LB	43	Tyrin Ferguson	Fr
DE	95	Jack Gangwish (C)	Sr
S	25	Nate Gerry (C)	Jr
LB	12	Luke Gifford	RFr
DB	29	Nolan Graham	RFr
S	21	Charles Jackson (injured)	Jr
DE	47	Matt Jarzynka	RFr
DL	50	Garret Johns	Jr
CB	8	Chris Jones	So
CB	11	Boaz Joseph	So
CB	10	Joshua Kalu	So
DE	19	Joe Keels	Sr
DE	17	Sedrick King	RFr
DB	42	Creighton Koley	RFr
LB	37	Noah Lazaro	Fr
DB	6	Eric Lee Jr.	Fr
DL	58	Joel Lopez	So
DT	55	Kevin Maurice	Jr
LB	33	Garrett McKay	Jr
DE	90	Greg McMullen	Jr
CB	2	Trai Mosley	RFr
DE	45	A.J. Natter	So
DE	9	DaiShon Neal	Fr
LB	3	Marcus Newby	So
DL	99	Peyton Newell	RFr
DL	76	Dylan Owen	RFr
LB	54	Garrett Poppen	RFr
DT	78	Givens Price	Sr
DT	97	Logan Rath	Jr
S	16	Antonio Reed	Fr
DB	22	Anthony Ridder	Sr
CB	14	Jonathan Rose	Sr
LB	15	Michael Rose-Ivey	Jr
LB	56	Brad Simpson	Jr
DL	44	Mick Stoltenberg	RFr
LB	13	Adrienne Talan	Fr
DT	98	Vincent Valentine	Jr
LB	49	Chris Weber	So
LB	57	Jacob Weinmaster	Fr
S	24	Aaron Williams	Fr
DT	92	Kevin Williams	Sr
S	26	Kieron Williams	So
LB	5	Dedrick Young	Fr

Special teams

Pos.	#	Name	Class
PK	34	Drew Brown	So
P	27	Sam Foltz	Jr
PK	95	Spencer Lindsay	Jr
LS	40	Jordan Ober	Fr
PK	26	Jamie Sutcliffe	Jr
LS	92	Chase Urbach	Fr

Head coach

- Mike Riley
  15th season
  1st year at Nebraska
  Alma mater: Alabama

Coordinators/assistant coaches

- Danny Langsdorf
  10th season as OC/QB coach
  1st year at Nebraska
  Alma mater: Linfield
- Mark Banker
  26th season as DC coach
  1st year at Nebraska
  Alma mater: Springfield
- Bruce Read
  7th season as STC coach
  1st year at Nebraska
  Alma mater: Portland State
- Trent Bray
  6th season as LB coach
  1st year at Nebraska
  Alma mater: Oregon State
- Mike Cavanaugh
  27th season as OL coach
  1st year at Nebraska
  Alma mater: S Conn St
- Reggie Davis
  7th season as RB coach
  1st year at Nebraska
  Alma mater: Washington
- Hank Hughes
  27th season as DL coach
  1st year at Nebraska
  Alma mater: Springfield
- Brian Stewart
  11th season as DB coach
  1st year at Nebraska
  Alma mater: Northern Arizona
- Keith Williams
  16th season as WR coach
  1st year at Nebraska
  Alma mater: San Diego State

Legend

- (C) Team captain
- (S) Suspended
- (I) Ineligible
- Injured
- Redshirt

Roster
Last update: November 6, 2015

=== Depth chart ===
Defense

FS
Byerson Cockrell
Aaron Williams
⋅

OUTSIDE	INSDIE	OUTSIDE
Dedrick Young	Josh Banderas	Marcus Newby; Michael Rose-Ivey
Brad Simpson	Chris Weber	Luke Gifford
⋅	⋅	⋅

SS
Nate Gerry
Kieron Williams
Antonio Reed

CB
Joshua Kalu
Daniel Davie
⋅

DE	DT	DT	DE
Jack Gangwish	Vincent Valentine	Maliek Collins	Greg McMullen
Freedom Akinmoldun	Kevin Williams	Kevin Maurice	Ross Dzuris
⋅	Mick Stoltenberg	⋅	⋅

CB
Jonathan Rose
Chris Jones
Trai Mosley
⋅

Offense

WR
Alonzo Moore
De'Mornay Pierson-El (injured)
⋅

WR
Brandon Reilly
Stanley Morgan
Lane Hovey

LT	LG	C	RG	RT
Alex Lewis	Dylan Utter	Ryne Reeves	Zach Sterup	Nick Gates
David Kneval	Jerald Foster	Paul Thurston	Chongo Kondolo	Zach Sterup
⋅	⋅	⋅	⋅	⋅

TE
Cethan Carter
Sam Cotton
David Sutton
Trey Foster

WR
Jordan Westerkamp
Taariq Allen
Jamal Turner
⋅

QB
Tommy Armstrong
Ryker Fyfe
A.J Bush

Key reserves
FB Andy Janovich
FB Harrison Jordan

Special teams
PK Drew Brown
P Sam Foltz
KR Stanley Morgan
Jordan Stevenson
PR De'Mornay Pierson-el
Jordan Westerkamp
LS Jordan Ober

RB
Terrell Newby
Imani Cross
Devine Ozigbo
Mikale Wilbon

== Rankings ==
Ranking movements Legend: ██ Increase in ranking ██ Decrease in ranking — = Not ranked RV = Received votes
	Week															
Poll	Pre	1	2	3	4	5	6	7	8	9	10	11	12	13	14	Final
AP	RV	—	—	—	—	—	—	—	—	—	—	—	—	—	—	—
Coaches	RV	RV	RV	—	—	—	—	—	—	—	—	—	—	—	—	—
CFP	Not released									—	—	—	—	—	—	Not released

== Game summaries ==
=== BYU ===
BYU at Nebraska

Team	1	2	3	4	Total
• BYU	7	17	0	9	33
Nebraska	14	0	14	0	28

- Date: September 5
- Location: Memorial Stadium
  Lincoln, NE
- Game start: 2:37 p.m. CDT
- Elapsed time: 3:42
- Game attendance: 89,959
- Game weather: 93 degrees, Wind: SSW @ 15 mph, Sunny
- Referee: Michael Cannon
- TV announcers (ABC): Sean McDonough, Chris Spielman, Todd McShay

Scoring summary
1	8:10	Nebraska	Jordan Westerkamp 14-yard pass from Tommy Armstrong (Drew Brown kick)	Nebraska 7–0
1	2:50	BYU	Taysom Hill 3-yard run (Trevor Samson kick)	7–7
1	0:16	Nebraska	Alonzo Moore 22-yard pass from Tommy Armstrong (Drew Brown kick)	Nebraska 14–7
2	13:13	BYU	Taysom Hill 21-yard run (Trevor Samson kick)	14–14
2	5:42	BYU	Trevor Samson 41-yard field goal	BYU 17–14
2	3:48	BYU	Mitch Mathews 15-yard pass from Taysom Hill (Trevor Samson kick)	BYU 24–14
3	10:39	Nebraska	Terrell Newby 10-yard run (Drew Brown kick)	BYU 24–21
3	5:31	Nebraska	Trey Foster 9-yard pass from Tommy Armstrong (Drew Brown kick)	Nebraska 28–24
4	7:57	BYU	Trevor Samson 35-yard field goal	Nebraska 28–27
4	0:00	BYU	Mitch Mathews 42-yard pass from Tanner Mangum	BYU 33–28

Overall record	Previous meeting	Previous winner
First meeting

BYU snapped Nebraska's 29-game season-opening winning streak on a last-second 42-yard Hail Mary pass from backup quarterback Tanner Mangum to Mitch Mathews. This was Nebraska's first season opening loss since 1985. BYU outgained Nebraska in total offense 511 yards to 445 yards. Nebraska was led by Tommy Armstrong who went 24-of-41 through the air for 319 yards with three touchdown passes and 1 interception. Terrell Newby was the team's leading rusher with 46 yards on 10 carries and a touchdown and Jordan Westerkamp was the top Husker receiver with seven catches for 107 yards and a touchdown. Taysom Hill was 21-of-34 for 268 yards with a touchdown and an interception before being knocked out of the game. His backup, Tanner Mangum was 7-of-11 for 111 yards with the game-winning hail mary touchdown pass. Hill was the leading Cougar rusher with 83 yards and two scores and Nick Kurtz was the top BYU receiver with five catches for 123 yards.

BYU Game starters

Position	Player
Quarterback	Tommy Armstrong
Running back	Terrell Newby
Wide receiver	Alonzo Moore
Wide receiver	Lane Hovey
Wide receiver	Jordan Westerkamp
Tight end	David Sutton
Left tackle	Alex Lewis
Left guard	Dylan Utter
Center	Ryne Reeves
Right guard	Chongo Kondolo
Right tackle	Nick Gates

Position	Player
Defensive end	Greg Mcmullen
Defensive tackle	Maliek Collins
Defensive tackle	Vincent Valentine
Defensive end	Jack Gangwish
Linebacker	Josh Banderas
Linebacker	Dedrick Young
Cornerback	Daniel Davie
Nickelback	Aaron Williams
Strong safety	Nate Gerry
Free safety	Byerson Cockrell
Cornerback	Joshua Kalu

=== South Alabama ===
South Alabama at Nebraska

Team	1	2	3	4	Total
South Alabama	0	0	3	6	9
• Nebraska	14	10	7	17	48

- Date: September 12
- Location: Memorial Stadium
  Lincoln, NE
- Game start: 7:00 p.m. CDT
- Elapsed time: 3:22
- Game attendance: 89,822
- Game weather: 69 degrees, Wind: SE @ 4 mph, clear
- Referee: Todd Geerlings
- TV announcers (BTN): Eric Collins, Glen Mason, Rick Pizzo

Scoring summary
1	10:02	Nebraska	Terrell Newby 13-yard run (Drew Brown kick)	Nebraska 7–0
1	6:05	Nebraska	Terrell Newby 8-yard pass from Tommy Armstrong (Drew Brown kick)	Nebraska 14–0
2	7:06	Nebraska	Terrell Newby 8-yard run (Drew Brown kick)	Nebraska 21–0
2	0:00	Nebraska	Drew Brown 42-yard field goal	Nebraska 24–0
3	8:04	Nebraska	Imani Cross 9-yard run (Drew Brown kick)	Nebraska 31–0
3	6:04	South Alabama	Sunanon Aleem 36-yard field goal	Nebraska 31–3
4	14:51	Nebraska	Drew Brown 25-yard field goal	Nebraska 34–3
4	10:11	Nebraska	Jordan Westerkamp 21-yard pass from Tommy Armstrong (Drew Brown kick)	Nebraska 41–3
4	8:30	Nebraska	Alonzo Moore 2-yard pass from Ryker Fyfe (Drew Brown kick)	Nebraska 48–3
4	3:36	South Alabama	Josh Magee 36-yard pass from Dallas Davis (TEAM rush failed)	Nebraska 48–9

Overall record	Previous meeting	Previous winner
First meeting

Nebraska used a balanced offensive effort and a stingy defense to put together four solid quarters of football in a 48–9 victory over South Alabama on Saturday night. Junior I-Back Terrell Newby raced to career highs with 28 carries for 198 yards and two touchdowns on the night, he also hauled in two catches for 38 yards and another score in the win. Tommy Armstrong was 21-of-30 for 270 yards and two scores. Nebraska totaled 561 yards of offense in the game with 258 yards on the ground and 303 in the air. The Huskers held South Alabama to 332 total yards, with 313 through the air and limiting the Jaguars to just 19 total yards rushing.

South Alabama Game starters

Position	Player
Quarterback	Tommy Armstrong
Running Back	Terrell Newby
Wide Receiver	Stanley Morgon
Wide Receiver	Brandon Reilly
Wide Receiver	Jordan Westerkamp
Tight End	Sam Cotton
Left Tackle	Alex Lewis
Left Guard	Dylan Utter
Center	Ryne Reeves
Right Guard	Chongo Kondolo
Right Tackle	Nick Gates

Position	Player
Defensive End	Greg Mcmullen
Defensive tackle	Maliek Collins
Defensive tackle	Vincent Valentine
Defensive End	Freedom Akinmolaun
Linebacker	Marcus Newby
Linebacker	Chris Weber
Linebacker	Michael Rose
Cornerback	Daniel Davie
Strong Safety	Nate Gerry
Free Safety	Byerson Cockrell
Cornerback	Joshua Kalu

=== Miami (FL) ===
Nebraska at Miami (FL)

Team	1	2	3	4	OT	Total
Nebraska	0	3	7	23	0	33
• Miami	17	3	10	3	3	36

- Date: September 19
- Location: Sun Life Stadium
  Miami Gardens, FL
- Game start: 3:30 p.m. EDT
- Elapsed time: 4:13
- Game attendance: 53,580
- Game weather: 81 deg, Sunny, Wind S@9 mph
- Referee: Dan Capron
- TV announcers (ABC/ESPN2): Mark Jones, Rod Gilmore, Quint Kessenich

Scoring summary
1	12:49	Miami	Chris Herndon 10-yard pass from Brad Kaaya (Michael Badgley kick)	Miami 7–0
1	8:04	Miami	Tyre Brady 11-yard pass from Brad Kaaya (Michael Badgley kick)	Miami 14–0
1	1:11	Miami	Michael Badgley 23-yard field goal	Miami 17–0
2	8:37	Nebraska	Drew Brown 49-yard field goal	Miami 17–3
2	6:05	Miami	Michael Badgley 27-yard field goal	Miami 20–3
3	13:50	Miami	Joe Yearby 41-yard run (Michael Badgley kick)	Miami 27–3
3	9:03	Nebraska	Jordan Westerkamp 22-yard pass from Tommy Armstrong (Drew Brown kick)	Miami 27–10
3	3:42	Miami	Michael Badgley 41-yard field goal	Miami 30–10
4	11:14	Miami	Michael Badgley 28-yard field goal	Miami 33–10
4	8:36	Nebraska	Alonzo Moore 10-yard pass from Tommy Armstrong (Cethan Carter pass from Tommy Armstrong)	Miami 33–18
4	3:46	Nebraska	Brandon Reilly 21-yard pass from Tommy Armstrong (Drew Brown kick)	Miami 33–25
4	0:33	Nebraska	Stanley Morgan 8-yard pass from Tommy Armstrong (Jordan Westerkamp pass from Tommy Armstrong)	33–33
OT	0:00	Miami	Michael Badgley 28-yard field goal	Miami 36–33

Overall record	Previous meeting	Previous winner
6–5	September 20, 2014	Nebraska, 41–31

Tommy Armstrong Jr. and the Huskers orchestrated a fourth-quarter comeback, erasing a 23-point deficit in the final 8:36 of regulation, but Miami escaped with a 36–33 overtime win on Saturday at Sun Life Stadium. Trailing 33–10 after Miami's Michael Badgley connected on his fourth field goal of the game. Armstrong led Nebraska to 23 unanswered points to send the game to overtime tied at 33. Nebraska's comeback included a trio of fourth quarter touchdown passes from Armstrong to Alonzo Moore, Brandon Reilly and Stanley Morgan Jr., and a pair of two point conversion passes to Jordan Westerkamp and Cethan Carter. In overtime Armstrong opened the extra period with an interception on the first play. Miami took over and kicked a 28-yard field goal to end the game. Armstrong ended the day going 21-of-45 for 309 yards with 4 TDs and 3 INTs. Terrell Newby was the top Husker rusher with 14 carries for 82 yards and Jordan Westerkamp led Nebraska's receivers with five catches for 95 yards and a touchdown. The Huskers gained 462 yards in the game and allowed 511 to the Hurricanes. Nebraska fell to 1–2 for the first time since 1981.

Miami Game starters

Position	Player
Quarterback	Tommy Armstrong
Running Back	Terrell Newby
Wide Receiver	Lane Hovey
Wide Receiver	Brandon Reilly
Wide Receiver	Jordan Westerkamp
Tight End	Cethan Carter
Left Tackle	Alex Lewis
Left Guard	Dylan Utter
Center	Ryne Reeves
Right Guard	Chongo Kondolo
Right Tackle	Nick Gates

Position	Player
Defensive End	Greg Mcmullen
Defensive tackle	Maliek Collins
Defensive tackle	Kevin Williams
Defensive End	Freedom Akinmoladun
Linebacker	Michael Rose
Linebacker	Josh Banderas
Linebacker	Dedrick Young
Cornerback	Daniel Davie
Strong Safety	Nate Gerry
Free Safety	Byerson Cockrell
Cornerback	Joshua Kalu

=== Southern Miss ===
Southern Miss at Nebraska

Team	1	2	3	4	Total
Southern Miss	0	0	7	21	28
• Nebraska	10	12	7	7	36

- Date: September 26
- Location: Memorial Stadium
  Lincoln, NE
- Game start: 11:01 a.m. CDT
- Elapsed time: 3:40
- Game attendance: 89,899
- Game weather: 69 degrees, Wind ENE @ 2 mph, Sunny, Clear
- Referee: Tim O'Dey
- TV announcers (ESPNews): Eamon McAnaney, Rocky Boiman

Scoring summary
1	9:57	Nebraska	Jordan Westerkamp 6-yard pass from Tommy Armstrong (Drew Brown kick)	Nebraska 7–0
1	4:24	Nebraska	Drew Brown 29-yard field goal	Nebraska 10–0
2	10:49	Nebraska	Drew Brown 27-yard field goal	Nebraska 13–0
2	5:31	Nebraska	Drew Brown 40-yard field goal	Nebraska 16–0
2	1:34	Nebraska	Drew Brown 22-yard field goal	Nebraska 19–0
2	0:00	Nebraska	Drew Brown 50-yard field goal	Nebraska 22–0
3	13:19	Southern Miss	Ito Smith 17-yard run (P. Shuanfield kick)	Nebraska 22–7
3	00:27	Nebraska	Taariq Allen 10-yard pass from Tommy Armstrong (Drew Brown kick)	Nebraska 29–7
4	13:34	Southern Miss	Casey Martin 21-yard pass from Nick Mullens (P. Shaunfield kick)	Nebraska 29–14
4	12:26	Southern Miss	Casey Maritn 19-yard pass from Nick Mullens (P. Shaunfield kick)	Nebraska 29–21
4	9:30	Nebraska	Tommy Armstrong 16-yard run (Drew Brown kick)	Nebraska 36–21
4	6:55	Southern Miss	Jalen Richard 1-yard run (P. Shaunfield kick)	Nebraska 36–28

Overall record	Previous meeting	Previous winner
4–1	September 7, 2013	Nebraska, 56–13

Tommy Armstrong, Drew Brown, Andy Janovich, Brandon Reilly and Jordan Westerkamp all produced career days to lead Nebraska to a 36–28 win over Southern Miss on Homecoming at Memorial Stadium. Brown tied an NCAA record by kicking five field goals in the first half to help Nebraska jump to a 22–0 halftime lead. He also tied the Memorial Stadium record for field goals made in a game. Westerkamp notched a career-high with 11 receptions for 118 yards and Reilly notched a career-high with 112 yards. Andy Janovich notched career highs rushing and receiving from the fullback position and Tommy Armstrong notched a career-high with 431 yards of total offense. The Husker defense for the fourth game this year allowed 300+ yards passing as Southern Miss threw for over 400 yards. The Golden Eagles mounted a comeback in the second half, but came up short as the Huskers held on for the 36–28 win to end the non-conference season.

Southern Miss Game starters

Position	Player
Quarterback	Tommy Armstrong
Running Back	Terrell Newby
Wide Receiver	Stanley Morgon
Wide Receiver	Brandon Reilly
Wide Receiver	Jordan Westerkamp
Tight End	Cethan Carter
Left Tackle	Alex Lewis
Left Guard	Dylan Utter
Center	Ryne Reeves
Right Guard	Chongo Kondolo
Right Tackle	Nick Gates

Position	Player
Defensive End	Greg Mcmullen
Defensive tackle	Maliek Collins
Defensive tackle	Kevin Williams
Defensive End	Freedom Akinmoladun
Linebacker	Marcus Newby
Linebacker	Chris Weber
Linebacker	Dedrick Young
Cornerback	Jonathan Rose
Strong Safety	Nate Gerry
Free Safety	Byerson Cockrell
Cornerback	Joshua Kalu

=== Illinois ===
Nebraska at Illinois

Team	1	2	3	4	Total
Nebraska	0	10	3	0	13
• Illinois	0	0	0	14	14

- Date: October 3
- Location: Memorial Stadium
  Champaign, IL
- Game start: 3:00 p.m. CDT
- Elapsed time: 3:34
- Game attendance: 40,138
- Game weather: Wind ENE @ 22 mph, 57 degrees, cloudy
- Referee: Ron Snodgrass
- TV announcers (BTN): Eric Collins, Chuck Long, Johnny Kane
- Sources:*Sources:

Scoring summary
2	12:35	Nebraska	Devine Ozigbo 19-yard run (Drew Brown kick)	Nebraska 7–0
2	0:11	Nebraska	Drew Brown 39-yard field goal	Nebraska 10–0
3	2:55	Nebraska	Drew Brown 28-yard field goal	Nebraska 13–0
4	13:21	Illinois	M. Murdock 22-yard pass from Wes Lunt (T. Zalewski kick)	Nebraska 13–7
4	0:10	Illinois	Geronimo Allison 1-yard pass from Wes Lunt (T. Zalewski kick)	Illinois 14–13

Overall record	Previous meeting	Previous winner
9–2–1	September 27, 2014	Nebraska, 45–14

For the fourth time in five contests, the outcome of Nebraska's game was not decided until the opponent's final offensive play, and for the third time, Nebraska walked away on the short end of the stick with a 14–13 loss to Illinois to open the Big Ten season. The game was decided on a one-yard touchdown pass from Wes Lunt to Geronimo Allison with 10 seconds remaining to complete the Illini's 13-point fourth quarter deficit. Nebraska gained 292 yards on the day, and allowed 382 yards. Tommy Armstrong had his worst passing day of the year, going 10-of-31 for 105 yards with an interception in the loss. Linebacker Chris Weber led the Blackshirts with a career-high 17 tackles, with three tackles for loss.

Illinois Game starters

Position	Player
Quarterback	Tommy Armstrong
Running Back	Terrell Newby
Wide Receiver	Alonzo Moore
Wide Receiver	Brandon Reilly
Wide Receiver	Jordan Westerkamp
Tight End	Cethan Carter
Left Tackle	Alex Lewis
Left Guard	Dylan Utter
Center	Ryne Reeves
Right Guard	Chongo Kondolo
Right Tackle	Nick Gates

Position	Player
Defensive End	Greg Mcmullen
Defensive tackle	Maliek Collins
Defensive tackle	Kevin Maurice
Defensive End	Jack Gangwish
Linebacker	Chris Weber
Linebacker	Dedrick Young
Cornerback	Jonathan Rose
Nickelback	Joshua Kalu
Strong Safety	Nate Gerry
Free Safety	Byerson Cockrell
Cornerback	Chris Jones

=== Wisconsin ===
Wisconsin at Nebraska
Freedom Trophy

Team	1	2	3	4	Total
• Wisconsin	0	7	3	13	23
Nebraska	0	14	0	7	21

- Date: October 10
- Location: Memorial Stadium
  Lincoln, NE
- Game start: 2:30 p.m. CDT
- Elapsed time: 3:26
- Game attendance: 89,886
- Game weather: 76 degrees, Wind SSW @ 7–10 mph, Sunny
- Referee: John O'Neill
- TV announcers (ABC/ESPN2): Adam Amin, Kelly Stouffer, Olivia Harlan
- Sources:*Sources:

Scoring summary
2	9:45	Wisconsin	Troy Fumagalli 7-yard pass from Joel Stave (R. Gaglianone kick)	Wisconsin 7–0
2	2:40	Nebraska	Tommy Armstrong 7-yard run (Drew Brown kick)	7–7
2	0:31	Nebraska	Alonzo Moore 41-yard pass from Tommy Armstrong (Drew Brown kick)	Nebraska 14–7
3	1:06	Wisconsin	R. Gaglianone 45-yard field goal	Nebraska 14–10
4	10:08	Wisconsin	Alec Ingold 1-yard run (R. Gaglianone kick)	Wisconsin 17–14
4	6:17	Wisconsin	R. Gaglianone 42-yard field goal	Wisconsin 20–14
4	3:38	Nebraska	Andy Janovich 55-yard run (Drew Brown kick)	Nebraska 21–20
4	0:04	Wisconsin	R. Gaglianone 46-yard field goal	Wisconsin 23–21

Overall record	Previous meeting	Previous winner
4–5	November 15, 2014	Wisconsin, 59–24

For the fourth time this season, Nebraska lost a game in the final seconds on the opponent's last offensive possession as Wisconsin kicked a 46-yard field goal with 0:04 remaining to seal a 23–21 win in Lincoln. With the loss, Nebraska drops to 2–4 for the first time since 1959. It is the seventh time in the last eight Nebraska games that the outcome has been decided by a single score. Wisconsin outgained the Huskers 469 yards (147 rush, 322 pass) to 325 yards (196 rush, 129 pass). Tommy Armstrong was 11-of-28 for 129 yards with a touchdown pass. Andy Janovich had three carries for 59 yards and a touchdown and Terrell Newby had 15 carries for 59 yards to lead the rushers, while Tommy Armstrong had 50 yards on eight carries and a score. Alonzo Moore was the top receiver with one catch for 41 yards and the touchdown. Byerson Cockrell lead the team in tackles with 10.

Wisconsin Game starters

Position	Player
Quarterback	Tommy Armstrong
Running Back	Terrell Newby
Wide Receiver	De'Mornay Pierson-El
Wide Receiver	Stanley Morgon
Wide Receiver	Jordan Westerkamp
Tight End	Cethan Carter
Left Tackle	Alex Lewis
Left Guard	Dylan Utter
Center	Ryne Reeves
Right Guard	Chongo Kondolo
Right Tackle	Nick Gates

Position	Player
Defensive End	Greg McMullen
Defensive tackle	Maliek Collins
Defensive tackle	Vincent Valentine
Defensive End	Jack Gangwish
Linebacker	Marcus Newby
Linebacker	Chris Weber
Linebacker	Dedrick Young
Cornerback	Jonathan Rose
Strong Safety	Nate Gerry
Free Safety	Byerson Cockrell
Cornerback	Joshua Kalu

=== Minnesota ===
Nebraska at Minnesota
$5 Bits of Broken Chair Trophy

Team	1	2	3	4	Total
• Nebraska	14	10	7	17	48
Minnesota	7	7	0	11	25

- Date: October 17
- Location: TCF Bank Stadium
  Minneapolis, MN
- Game start: 2:35 p.m. CDT
- Elapsed time: 3:25
- Game attendance: 54,062
- Game weather: Sunny
- Referee: Mike Cannon
- TV announcers (ESPN2): Eamon McAnaney, Rocky Boiman, Jane Slater
- Sources:*Sources:

Scoring summary
1	10:14	Minnesota	Eric Carter 24-yard pass from Mitch Leidner (Ryan Santoso kick)	Minnesota 7–0
1	8:52	Nebraska	Terrell Newby 69-yard run (Drew Brown kick)	7–7
1	3:50	Nebraska	Alonzo Moore 32-yard pass from Tommy Armstrong (Drew Brown kick)	Nebraska 14–7
2	9:46	Nebraska	Drew Brown 45-yard field goal	Nebraska 17–7
2	6:02	Minnesota	K. J. Maye 7-yard run (Ryan Santoso kick)	Nebraska 17–14
2	1:55	Nebraska	Terrell Newby 9-yard run (Drew Brown kick)	Nebraska 24–14
3	4:16	Nebraska	Cethan Carter 10-yard pass from Tommy Armstrong (Drew Brown kick)	Nebraska 31–14
4	14:21	Nebraska	De'Mornay Pierson-El 14-yard pass from Tommy Armstrong (Drew Brown kick)	Nebraska 38–14
4	11:52	Minnesota	Mitch Leidner 1-yard run (K.J. Maye pass from Mitch Leidner)	Nebraska 38–22
4	6:49	Minnesota	Ryan Santoso 39-yard field goal	Nebraska 38–25
4	3:06	Nebraska	Drew Brown 41-yard field goal	Nebraska 41–25
4	2:10	Nebraska	Joshua Kalu 41-yard interception return (Drew Brown kick)	Nebraska 48–25

Overall record	Previous meeting	Previous winner
22–31–2	November 22, 2014	Minnesota, 28–24

Nebraska clinched their first Big Ten victory under Mike Riley with a 48–25 win over Minnesota in Minneapolis. Nebraska jumped to a 17–7 lead and then scored 21 unanswered to secure the win. Tommy Armstrong was 18-of-26 for 261 yards and had eight carries for 38 yards to lead the Huskers. Terrell Newby rushed 13 times for 116 yards and a pair of touchdowns in the win with the Huskers gaining 464 total yards of offense while Blackshirts held Minnesota to 366 yards and forced three turnovers.

Minnesota Game starters

Position	Player
Quarterback	Tommy Armstrong
Running Back	Terrell Newby
Wide Receiver	Alonzo Moore
Wide Receiver	De'Mornay Pierson-El
Wide Receiver	Taariq Allen
Tight End	Cethan Carter
Left Tackle	Alex Lewis
Left Guard	Dylan Utter
Center	Ryne Reeves
Right Guard	Chongo Kondolo
Right Tackle	Zach Streup

Position	Player
Defensive End	Greg Mcmullen
Defensive tackle	Maliek Collins
Defensive tackle	Vincent Valentine
Defensive End	Jack Gangwish
Linebacker	Marcus Newby
Linebacker	Josh Banderas
Linebacker	Dedrick Young
Cornerback	Jonathan Rose
Strong Safety	Nate Gerry
Free Safety	Byerson Cockrell
Cornerback	Joshua Kalu

=== Northwestern ===
Northwestern at Nebraska

Team	1	2	3	4	Total
• Northwestern	7	10	3	10	30
Nebraska	5	7	7	9	28

- Date: October 24
- Location: Memorial Stadium
  Lincoln, NE
- Game start: 11:00 a.m. CDT
- Elapsed time: 3:30
- Game attendance: 89,493
- Game weather: Sunny, 53 degrees, Wind WNW @ 15 mph
- Referee: Jerry McGinn
- TV announcers (ESPN2): Beth Mowins, Anthony Becht, Paul Carcattera

Scoring summary
1	10:26	Nebraska	Drew Brown 43-yard field goal	Nebraska 3–0
1	8:45	Northwestern	Clayton Thorson 1-yard run (Jack Mitchell kick)	Northwestern 7–3
1	5:19	Nebraska	Team Safety	Northwestern 7–5
2	7:17	Northwestern	Nick VanHoose 72-yard interception return (Jack Mitchell kick)	Northwestern 14–5
2	1:07	Nebraska	Brandon Reilly 10-yard pass from Tommy Armstrong (Drew Brown kick)	Northwestern 14–12
2	0:00	Northwestern	Jack Mitchell 28-yard field goal	Northwestern 17–12
3	8:59	Nebraska	Tommy Armstrong 4-yard run (Drew Brown kick)	Nebraska 19–17
3	5:18	Northwestern	Jack Mitchell 18-yard field goal	Northwestern 20–19
4	14:55	Nebraska	Drew Brown 48-yard field goal	Nebraska 22–20
4	9:53	Northwestern	Dan Vitale 37-yard pass from Clayton Thorson (Jack Mitchell kick)	Northwestern 27–22
4	7:27	Northwestern	Jack Mitchell 27-yard field goal	Northwestern 30–22
4	4:23	Nebraska	Tommy Armstrong 3-yard run (Tommy Armstrong PAT pass failed)	Northwestern 30–28

Overall record	Previous meeting	Previous winner
6–2	October 18, 2014	Nebraska, 38–17

In another game that went down to the wire, Nebraska watched a two-point conversion attempt fall incomplete with 4:23 left, allowing Northwestern to escape Memorial Stadium with a 30–28 win. With Nebraska's fifth loss of the season by five or fewer points, the Huskers slip to 3–5 overall and 1–3 in the Big Ten. Nebraska's five losses have come by a total of 13 points. Nebraska outgained Northwestern in total offense 373 yards (291 pass, 82 rush) to 333 yards (177 pass, 156 rush). Tommy Armstrong was 24-of-48 for 291 yards with 1 TD and 1 INT in the loss. Terrell Newby was the top rusher with 16 carries for 53 yards and Jordan Westerkamp the top receiver with five catches for 92 yards.

Northwestren Game starters

Position	Player
Quarterback	Tommy Armstrong
Running Back	Terrell Newby
Wide Receiver	Taariq Allen
Wide Receiver	Alonzo Moore
Wide Receiver	Jordan Westerkamp
Tight End	Cethan Carter
Left Tackle	Alex Lewis
Left Guard	Dylan Utter
Center	Ryne Reeves
Right Guard	Chongo Kondolo
Right Tackle	Zach Sterup

Position	Player
Defensive End	Ross Dzuris
Defensive tackle	Greg Mcmullen
Defensive tackle	Maliek Collins
Defensive End	Jack Gangwish
Linebacker	Josh Banderas
Linebacker	Dedrick Young
Cornerback	Chris Jones
Nickelback	Joshua Kalu
Strong Safety	Nate Gerry
Free Safety	Byerson Cockrell
Cornerback	Daniel Davie

=== Purdue ===
Nebraska at Purdue

Team	1	2	3	4	Total
Nebraska	3	6	7	29	45
• Purdue	7	14	21	13	55

- Date: October 31
- Location: Ross–Ade Stadium
  West Lafayette, IN
- Game start: 11:00 a.m. EDT
- Elapsed time: 3:45
- Game attendance: 31,351
- Game weather: 47 degrees, cloudy, Wind SSE @ 11 mph
- Referee: Don Willard
- TV announcers (ESPNU): Anish Shroff, Ahmad Brooks

Scoring summary
1	7:53	Nebraska	Drew Brown 41-yard field goal	Nebraska 3–0
1	5:06	Purdue	David Blough 56-yard run (Paul Griggs kick)	Purdue 7–3
2	13:48	Purdue	Danny Anthrop 3-yard pass from David Blough (Paul Griggs kick)	Purdue 14–3
2	11:52	Nebraska	Stanley Morgan Jr. 20-yard pass from Ryker Fyfe (Drew Brown PAT blocked)	Purdue 14–9
2	4:12	Purdue	Domonique Young 4-yard run (Paul Griggs kick)	Purdue 21–9
3	12:04	Nebraska	Imani Cross 9-yard run (Drew Brown kick)	Purdue 21–16
3	7:42	Purdue	Jordan Jurasevich 5 yard pass from David Blough (Paul Griggs kick)	Purdue 28–16
3	5:19	Purdue	DeAngelo Yancey 83-yard pass from David Blough (Paul Griggs kick)	Purdue 35–16
3	2:34	Purdue	DeAngelo Yancey 9-yard pass from David Blough (Paul Griggs kick)	Purdue 42–16
4	14:56	Nebraska	Lane Hovey 17-yard pass from Ryker Fyfe (Drew Brown kick)	Purdue 42–23
4	11:39	Nebraska	Andy Janovich 1-yard run (Jordan Westerkamp PAT pass from Ryker Fyfe)	Purdue 42–31
4	5:51	Purdue	Markell Jones 6-yard run (Paul Griggs kick)	Purdue 49–31
4	3:27	Nebraska	Brandon Reilly 8-yard pass from Ryker Fyfe (Drew Brown kick)	Purdue 49–38
4	1:02	Purdue	Markell Jones 8-yard run (Paul Griggs PAT blocked)	Purdue 55–38
4	0:30	Nebraska	Jordan Westerkamp 35 yard pass from Ryker Fyfe (Drew Brown kick)	Purdue 55–45

Overall record	Previous meeting	Previous winner
2–1	November 1, 2014	Nebraska, 35–14

Nebraska turned the ball over five times and suffered a 55–45 loss to Purdue at Ross-Ade Stadium. The Huskers slipped to 3–6 overall and 1–4 in the Big Ten. Ryker Fyfe made his first career start at quarterback in place of injured starter Tommy Armstrong and threw for 407 yards and four touchdowns despite also throwing four interceptions and losing one fumble. The five turnovers were converted into 28 points by the Boilermakers. The Huskers were also without receivers Alonzo Moore and De'Moarnay Pierson-El and running back Terrell Newby to injury as well. Nebraska outgained Purdue in total offense with 484 total yards compared to Purdue's 457 yards. Nebraska rallied with 29 fourth quarter points, the second-best point total in the quarter in school history, trailing only 30 points scored at Hawaii in December 1982. Jordan Westerkamp hauled in nine passes for 123 yards and a touchdown in the loss to help lead the Huskers. The loss marked the 1st time in Huskers football history that they lost 6 games before the start of November.

Purdue Game starters

Position	Player
Quarterback	Ryker Fyfe
Running Back	Terrell Newby
Wide Receiver	Lane Hovey
Wide Receiver	Brandon Reilly
Wide Receiver	Jordan Westerkamp
Tight End	Cethan Carter
Left Tackle	Alex Lewis
Left Guard	Dylan Utter
Center	Ryne Reeves
Right Guard	Chongo Kondolo
Right Tackle	Zach Sterup

Position	Player
Defensive End	Ross Dzuris
Defensive tackle	Greg Mcmullen
Defensive tackle	Vincent Valentine
Defensive End	Jack Gangwish
Linebacker	Josh Banderas
Linebacker	Dedrick Young
Cornerback	Chris Jones
Nickelback	Joshua Kalu
Strong Safety	Nate Gerry
Free Safety	Aaron Williams
Cornerback	Daniel Davie

=== Michigan State ===
Michigan State at Nebraska

Team	1	2	3	4	Total
#6 Michigan State	3	14	14	7	38
• Nebraska	10	3	7	19	39

- Date: November 7
- Location: Memorial Stadium
  Lincoln, NE
- Game start: 6:00 p.m. CST
- Elapsed time: 3:38
- Game attendance: 90,094
- Game weather: 49 degrees, Wind Calm, Clear
- Referee: John O'Neill
- TV announcers (ESPN): Dave Pasch, Brian Griese, Tom Luginbill

Scoring summary
1	7:10	Nebraska	Drew Brown 44-yard field goal	Nebraska 3–0
1	2:07	Nebraska	Jordan Westerkamp 38-yard pass from Tommy Armstrong (Drew Brown kick)	Nebraska 10–0
1	0:30	Michigan State	Michael Geiger 46-yard field goal	Nebraska 10–3
2	11:35	Michigan State	M. Kings 18-yard pass from Connor Cook (Michael Geiger kick)	10–10
2	4:21	Nebraska	Drew Brown 43-yard field goal	Nebraska 13–10
2	0:17	Michigan State	M. Kings 18-yard pass from Connor Cook (Michael Geiger kick)	Michigan State 17–13
3	12:31	Nebraska	Imani Cross 1-yard run (Drew Brown kick)	Nebraska 20–17
3	9:13	Michigan State	Aaron Burbridge 33-yard pass from Connor Cook (Michael Geiger kick)	Michigan State 24–20
3	2:14	Michigan State	Jamal Lyles 16-yard pass from Connor Cook (Michael Geiger kick)	Michigan State 31–20
4	13:06	Nebraska	Tommy Armstrong 2-yard run (PAT pass failed)	Michigan State 31–26
4	4:16	Michigan State	Gerald Holmes 1-yard run (Michael Geiger kick)	Michigan State 38–26
4	1:47	Nebraska	Tommy Armstrong 1-yard run (Drew Brown kick)	Michigan State 38–33
4	0:17	Nebraska	Brandon Reilly 30-yard pass from Tommy Armstrong (PAT pass failed)	Nebraska 39–38

Overall record	Previous meeting	Previous winner
7–2	October 4, 2014	Michigan State, 27–22

Nebraska scored two touchdowns in the final 1:47 of the game to rally for a 39–38 upset over #7 ranked Michigan State. The Huskers' 12-point rally in the fourth quarter tied for the largest fourth quarter rally in school history. Nebraska outgained MSU in total offense 499 yards to 491 yards. Tommy Armstrong finished the day going 19-of-33 for 320 yards with 2 TDs and 2 INTs. He also added 19 yards rushing and two scores on the ground. Imani Cross had 18 carries for 98 yards and a touchdown while Jordan Westerkamp had the top day for the receivers with 9 catches for 143 yards and a touchdown. Brandon Reilly added three catches for 87 yards and the game-winning touchdown. It was the first time an unranked Nebraska team beat a Top 10 ranked opponent since 1977.

Michigan State Game starters

Position	Player
Quarterback	Tommy Armstrong
Running Back	Imani Cross
Wide Receiver	Alonzo Moore
Wide Receiver	Brandon Reilly
Wide Receiver	Jordan Westerkamp
Tight End	Cethan Carter
Left Tackle	Alex Lewis
Left Guard	Dylan Utter
Center	Ryne Reeves
Right Guard	Zach Sterup
Right Tackle	Nick Gates

Position	Player
Defensive End	Greg Mcmullen
Defensive tackle	Maliek Collins
Defensive tackle	Vincent Valentine
Defensive End	Jack Gangwish
Linebacker	Marcus Newby
Linebacker	Josh Banderas
Linebacker	Dedrick Young
Cornerback	Chris Jones
Strong Safety	Nate Gerry
Free Safety	Byerson Cockrell
Cornerback	Joshua Kalu

=== Rutgers ===
Nebraska at Rutgers

Team	1	2	3	4	Total
• Nebraska	14	7	7	3	31
Rutgers	0	7	7	0	14

- Date: November 14
- Location: High Point Solutions Stadium
  Piscataway, NJ
- Game start: 2:30 p.m. CST
- Elapsed time: 3:13
- Game attendance: 45,606
- Game weather: 49 deg, Sunny, Wind NW @ 20 mph
- Referee: J. Servinski
- TV announcers (BTN): Josh Lewin, J Leman, Tina Cervasio

Scoring summary
1	10:56	Nebraska	Cethan Carter 32-yard run (Drew Brown kick)	Nebraska 7–0
1	2:39	Nebraska	Jordan Westerkamp 15-yard pass from Tommy Armstrong (Drew Brown kick)	Nebraska 14–0
2	11:49	Nebraska	Alonzo Moore 44-yard pass from Tommy Armstrong (Drew Brown kick)	Nebraska 21–0
2	1:17	Rutgers	Robert Martin 1-yard run (Kyle Federico kick)	Nebraska 21–7
3	6:03	Rutgers	Chris Laviano 5-yard pass from Janarion Grant (Kyle Federico kick)	Nebraska 21–14
3	1:58	Nebraska	Cethan Carter 11-yard pass from Tommy Armstrong (Drew Brown kick)	Nebraska 28–14
4	14:50	Nebraska	Drew Brown 44-yard field goal	Nebraska 31–14

Overall record	Previous meeting	Previous winner
2–0	October 25, 2014	Nebraska, 42–24

Nebraska jumped out to a 21–0 lead and never looked back in a 31–14 victory over Rutgers at High Point Solutions Stadium. The Huskers wasted little time, marking 78 yards in eight plays to score on the game's opening drive. The Blackshirt defense played its most complete game of the year, coming up with six sacks, 10 tackles for loss and 2 interceptions in the win. The Huskers held the Scarlet Knights to just 259 yards of offense. Nebraska gained 362 total yards on the day (174 rush, 188 pass). Tommy Armstrong was 14-of-21 for 188 yards with 3 TD passes and 3 INT. Cethan Carter was the top receiver with four catches for 57 yards and a touchdown while Imani Cross led the Huskers on the ground with 20 carries for 94 yards.

Rutgers Game starters

Position	Player
Quarterback	Tommy Armstrong
Running Back	Imani Cross
Wide Receiver	Alonzo Moore
Wide Receiver	Lane Hovey
Wide Receiver	Jordan Westerkamp
Tight End	Cethan Carter
Left Tackle	Alex Lewis
Left Guard	Dylan Utter
Center	Ryne Reeves
Right Guard	Zach Sterup
Right Tackle	Nick Gates

Position	Player
Defensive End	Greg Mcmullen
Defensive tackle	Maliek Collins
Defensive tackle	Vincent Valentine
Defensive End	Jack Gangwish
Linebacker	Marcus Newby
Linebacker	Josh Banderas
Linebacker	Dedrick Young
Cornerback	Chris Jones
Nickelback	Joshua Kalu
Strong Safety	Nate Gerry
Free Safety	Byerson Cockrell
Cornerback	Jonathan Rose

=== Iowa ===
Iowa at Nebraska
Heroes Trophy

Team	1	2	3	4	Total
• Iowa	0	14	14	0	28
Nebraska	0	10	7	3	20

- Date: November 27
- Location: Memorial Stadium
  Lincoln, NE
- Game start: 2:30 p.m. CST
- Elapsed time: 3:23
- Game attendance: 90,830
- Game weather: 24 degrees, overcast, Wind N @ 13 mph
- Referee: Ron Snodgrass
- TV announcers (ABC): Adam Amin, Kelly Stouffer, Olivia Harlan

Scoring summary
2	13:50	Iowa	George Kittle 10-yard pass from C. J. Beathard (Marshall Koehn kick)	Iowa 7–0
2	10:18	Nebraska	Imani Cross 4-yard run (Drew Brown kick)	7–7
2	6:38	Iowa	Parker Hesse 4-yard interception return (Marshall Koehn kick)	Iowa 14–7
2	0:03	Nebraska	Drew Brown 39-yard field goal	Iowa 14–10
3	12:17	Iowa	Jordan Canzeri 29-yard run (Marshall Koehn kick)	Iowa 21–10
3	7:00	Nebraska	Imani Cross 4-yard run (Drew Brown kick)	Iowa 21–17
3	6:43	Iowa	Jordan Canzeri 68-yard run (Marshall Koehn kick)	Iowa 28–17
4	1:17	Nebraska	Drew Brown 42-yard field goal	Iowa 28–20

Overall record	Previous meeting	Previous winner
29–13–3	November 28, 2014	Nebraska, 37–34 ^{OT}

Despite outgaining Iowa in total yardage, time of possession and plays run, the Hawkeyes held on for a 28–20 win over Nebraska in the HyVee Heroes Game on Black Friday. Nebraska's defense held Iowa to 0-of-9 on third downs, but four interceptions by the Huskers and untimely penalties doomed Nebraska. Nebraska outgained Iowa 433 yards (296 pass, 137 rush) to 250 yards (97 pass, 153 rush). Tommy Armstrong was 25-of-45 for 296 yards with 4 INT. Imani Cross was the leading rusher with 19 carries for 58 yards and two TDs. Terrell Newby had a team-high five receptions for 22 yards in the loss, while Cethan Carter caught four passes for a team-high 76 yards.

Iowa Game starters

Position	Player
Quarterback	Tommy Armstrong
Running Back	Imani Cross
Wide Receiver	Lane Hovey
Wide Receiver	Brandon Reilly
Wide Receiver	Jordan Westerkamp
Tight End	Cethan Carter
Left Tackle	Alex Lewis
Left Guard	Dylan Utter
Center	Ryne Reeves
Right Guard	Zach Sterup
Right Tackle	Nick Gates

Position	Player
Defensive End	Greg Mcmullen
Defensive tackle	Maliek Collins
Defensive tackle	Vincent Valentine
Defensive End	Jack Gangwish
Linebacker	Marcus Newby
Linebacker	Josh Banderas
Linebacker	Dedrick Young
Cornerback	Chris Jones
Strong Safety	Nate Gerry
Free Safety	Byerson Cockrell
Cornerback	Joshua Kalu

=== Foster Farms Bowl ===
UCLA vs. Nebraska
Foster Farms Bowl

Team	1	2	3	4	Total
UCLA	7	14	8	0	29
• Nebraska	7	14	9	7	37

- Date: December 26
- Location: Levi's Stadium
  Santa Clara, CA
- Game start: 8:15 p.m. CST
- Elapsed time: 3:18
- Game attendance: 33,527
- Game weather: Partly cloudy, 46 degrees, Wind N @ 7 mph
- Referee: Ron Cherry
- TV announcers (ESPN): Jason Benetti, Rod Gilmore, Shelley Smith

Scoring summary
1	10:17	UCLA	Paul Perkins 1-yard run (Kaʻimi Fairbairn kick)	UCLA 7–0
1	3:50	Nebraska	Imani Cross 1-yard run (Drew Brown kick)	7–7
2	11:04	UCLA	Kenneth Walker 60-yard pass from Josh Rosen (Kaʻimi Fairbairn kick)	UCLA 14–7
2	1:17	UCLA	Nate Starks 26-yard pass from Josh Rosen (Kaʻimi Fairbairn kick)	UCLA 21–7
2	6:23	Nebraska	Terrell Newby 3-yard run (Drew Brown kick)	UCLA 21–14
2	0:52	Nebraska	Andy Janovich 1-yard run (Drew Brown kick)	21–21
3	10:37	Nebraska	Stanley Morgan Jr. 22-yard pass from Tommy Armstrong Jr. (Drew Brown kick failed)	Nebraska 27–21
3	4:50	Nebraska	Drew Brown 20-yard field goal	Nebraska 30–21
4	14:11	Nebraska	Tommy Armstrong Jr. 3-yard run (Drew Brown kick)	Nebraska 37–21
4	11:29	UCLA	Jordan Payton 9-yard pass from Josh Rosen (Thomas Duarte PAT pass from Josh Rosen)	Nebraska 37–29

Overall record	Previous meeting	Previous winner
6–6	September 14, 2013	UCLA, 41–21

Tommy Armstrong threw and ran for touchdowns to help Nebraska cap its season on a bright note with a 37–29 win over UCLA in the Foster Farms Bowl. Nebraska scored 30 straight points after falling behind 21–7 early on. The Huskers rushed for a season-high 326 yards (151 in the third quarter alone) in the win and ended the game plus-one in turnover margin. Armstrong ended the night going 12-of-19 for 174 yards with a touchdown pass and added 76 yards rushing on 10 carries with a score on the ground. Freshman Devine Ozigbo led all rushers with 20 carries for 80 yards. Jordan Westerkamp was the top receiver for Nebraska with two catches for 44 yards. For his effort, Tommy Armstrong was named Offensive MVP of the Foster Farms Bowl. Also, head coach Mike Riley became the first coach to win this bowl game twice, after also having won the game in (2007)

UCLA Game starters

Position	Player
Quarterback	Tommy Armstrong
Running Back	Imani Cross
Wide Receiver	Jamal Turner
Wide Receiver	Taariq Allen
Wide Receiver	Jordan Westerkamp
Tight End	Cethan Carter
Left Tackle	Alex Lewis
Left Guard	Dylan Utter
Center	Ryne Reeves
Right Guard	Zach Sterup
Right Tackle	Nick Gates

Position	Player
Defensive End	Greg Mcmullen
Defensive tackle	Maliek Collins
Defensive tackle	Vincent Valentine
Defensive End	Jack Gangwish
Linebacker	Michael Rose
Linebacker	Josh Banderas
Cornerback	Chris Jones
Nickelback	Byerson Cockrell
Strong Safety	Nate Gerry
Free Safety	Aaron Williams
Cornerback	Joshua Kalu

== Big Ten awards ==
=== Player of the Week Honors ===
Week	Award	Player	Position
Week 2	Offensive	Terrell Newby	RB
Week 4	Offensive	Tommy Armstrong Jr.	QB
Week 5	Special Teams	Sam Foltz	P
Week 10	Offensive	Tommy Armstrong Jr.	QB

=== All Conference Honors ===
2015 Big Ten All-Conference Honors

Eddleman-Fields Punter of the Year
Sam Foltz

Position	Player	Team
Coaches All-Big Ten
P	Sam Foltz	First Team
WR	Jordan Westerkamp	Second Team
OT	Alex Lewis	Second Team
DT	Maliek Collins	Second Team
K	Drew Brown	Honorable Mention
S	Nathan Gerry	Honorable Mention
FB	Andy Janovich	Honorable Mention
CB	Joshua Kalu	Honorable Mention

Position	Player	Team
Media All-Big Ten
P	Sam Foltz	First Team
WR	Jordan Westerkamp	Second Team
OT	Alex Lewis	Third Team
DT	Maliek Collins	Third Team
S	Nathan Gerry	Third Team
TE	Cethan Carter	Honorable Mention

== NFL draft ==
- Maliek Collins (DT, 3rd round, 67th pick, Dallas Cowboys)
- Vincent Valentine (DT, 3rd round, 96th pick, New England Patriots)
- Alex Lewis (OT, 4th round, 130th pick, Baltimore Ravens)
- Andy Janovich (FB, 6th round, 176th pick, Denver Broncos)
