= 2015 All-Big Ten Conference football team =

American college football all-star team

The 2015 All-Big Ten Conference football team consists of American football players chosen as All-Big Ten Conference players for the 2015 Big Ten Conference football season. The conference recognizes two official All-Big Ten selectors: (1) the Big Ten conference coaches selected separate offensive and defensive units and named first- and second-team players (the "Coaches" team); and (2) a panel of sports writers and broadcasters covering the Big Ten also selected offensive and defensive units and named first- and second-team players (the "Media" team).

== Offensive selections ==
=== Quarterbacks ===
- Connor Cook, Michigan State (Coaches-1; Media-1)
- C. J. Beathard, Iowa (Coaches-2; Media-2)
- Nate Sudfeld, Indiana (Coaches-3; Media-3)

=== Running backs ===
- Ezekiel Elliott, Ohio State (Coaches-1; Media-1)
- Jordan Howard, Indiana (Coaches-1; Media-1)
- Justin Jackson, Northwestern (Coaches-2; Media-2)
- Saquon Barkley, Penn State (Coaches-2; Media-2)
- Josh Ferguson, Illinois (Coaches-3; Media-3)
- Jordan Canzeri, Iowa (Coaches-3; Media-3)

=== Wide receivers ===
- Aaron Burbridge, Michigan State (Coaches-1; Media-1)
- Alex Erickson, Wisconsin (Coaches-2; Media-1)
- Jehu Chesson, Michigan (Coaches-1)
- Jordan Westerkamp, Nebraska (Coaches-2; Media-2)
- Chris Godwin, Penn State (Coaches-3; Media-2)
- Michael Thomas, Ohio State (Coaches-3; Media-3)
- Leonte Carroo, Rutgers (Media-3)

=== Centers ===
- Jack Allen, Michigan State (Coaches-1; Media-1)
- Austin Blythe, Iowa (Coaches-2; Media-2)
- Jacoby Boren, Ohio State (Coaches-3; Media-3)

=== Guards ===
- Pat Elflein, Ohio State (Coaches-1; Media-1)
- Jordan Walsh, Iowa (Coaches-1; Media-2)
- Dan Feeney, Indiana (Coaches-2; Media-1)
- Brian Allen, Michigan State (Coaches-2; Media-2)
- Donavon Clark, Michigan State (Coaches-3)
- Billy Price, Ohio State (Coaches-3)
- Ted Karras, Illinois (Media-3)
- Kyle Kalis, Michigan (Media-3)

=== Tackles ===
- Jack Conklin, Michigan State (Coaches-1; Media-1)
- Taylor Decker, Ohio State (Coaches-1; Media-1)
- Jason Spriggs, Indiana (Coaches-2; Media-2)
- Alex Lewis, Nebraska (Coaches-2; Media-3)
- Tyler Marz, Wisconsin (Coaches-3; Media-2)
- Erik Magnuson, Michigan (Coaches-3; Media-3)

=== Tight ends ===
- Jake Butt, Michigan (Coaches-1; Media-1)
- Dan Vitale, Northwestern (Coaches-2; Media-2)
- Josiah Price, Michigan State (Coaches-3; Media-3)

== Defensive selections ==
=== Defensive linemen ===
- Yannick Ngakoue, Maryland (Coaches-1; Media-1)
- Shilique Calhoun, Michigan State (Coaches-1; Media-1)
- Joey Bosa, Ohio State (Coaches-1; Media-1)
- Carl Nassib, Penn State (Coaches-1; Media-1)
- Malik McDowell, Michigan State (Coaches-2; Media-2)
- Dean Lowry, Northwestern (Coaches-2; Media-2)
- Adolphus Washington, Ohio State (Coaches-2; Media-2)
- Maliek Collins, Nebraska (Coaches-2; Media-3)
- Austin Johnson, Penn State (Coaches-3; Media-2)
- Nate Meier, Iowa (Coaches-3; Media-3)
- Anthony Zettel, Penn State (Coaches-3; Media-3)
- Chris Wormley, Michigan (Coaches-3)
- Deonte Gibson, Northwestern (Media-3)

=== Linebackers ===
- Anthony Walker Jr., Northwestern (Coaches-1; Media-1)
- Joe Schobert, Wisconsin (Coaches-1; Media-1)
- Joshua Perry, Ohio State (Coaches-1; Media-2)
- Raekwon McMillan, Ohio State (Coaches-2; Media-1)
- Josey Jewell, Iowa (Coaches-2; Media-2)
- Darron Lee, Ohio State (Coaches-2; Media-3)
- Riley Bullough, Michigan State (Coaches-3; Media-2)
- Vince Biegel, Wisconsin (Coaches-3; Media-3)
- Darien Harris, Michigan State (Coaches-3)
- Steve Longa, Rutgers (Media-3)

=== Defensive backs ===
- Desmond King, Iowa (Coaches-1; Media-1)
- Jourdan Lewis, Michigan (Coaches-1; Media-1)
- Jabrill Peppers, Michigan (Coaches-1; Media-1)
- William Likely, Maryland (Coaches-1; Media-2)
- Vonn Bell, Ohio State (Coaches-2; Media-1)
- Nick VanHoose, Northwestern (Coaches-2; Media-2)
- Michael Caputo, Wisconsin (Coaches-2; Media-2)
- Eli Apple, Ohio State (Coaches-2)
- Clayton Fejedelem, Illinois (Media-2)
- Eric Murray, Minnesota (Coaches-3; Media-3)
- Matthew Harris, Northwestern (Coaches-3; Media-3)
- Jordan Lomax, Iowa (Coaches-3)
- Demetrious Cox, Michigan State (Coaches-3)
- Briean Boddy-Calhoun, Minnesota (Media-3)
- Nate Gerry, Nebraska (Media-3)

== Special teams ==
=== Kickers ===
- Griffin Oakes, Indiana (Coaches-1; Media-1)
- Marshall Koehn, Iowa (Coaches-2)
- Drew Brown, Nebraska (Media-2)
- Ryan Santoso, Minnesota (Coaches-3)
- Kenny Allen, Michigan (Media-3)

=== Punters ===
- Sam Foltz, Nebraska (Coaches-1; Media-1)
- Cameron Johnston, Ohio State (Coaches-2; Media-2)
- Peter Mortell, Minnesota (Coaches-3; Media-3)

=== Return specialist ===
- William Likely, Maryland (Coaches-1; Media-1)
- Janarion Grant, Rutgers (Media-2; Coaches-3)
- Jabrill Peppers, Michigan (Coaches-2)
- Solomon Vault, Northwestern (Media-3)

== Key ==
Bold = Consensus first-team selection by both the coaches and media

Coaches = Selected by the Big Ten Conference coaches

Media = Selected by the conference media

== See also ==
- 2015 College Football All-America Team
