= Jack Allen (American football) =

American football player (born 1992)

No. 66, 74
- Position: Center

Personal information
- Born: September 24, 1992 (age 34); Hinsdale, Illinois, U.S.
- Listed height: 6 ft 2 in (1.88 m)
- Listed weight: 296 lb (134 kg)

Career information
- High school: Hinsdale (IL) Central
- College: Michigan State
- NFL draft: 2016: undrafted

Career history
- New Orleans Saints (2016–2017); Chicago Bears (2018)*; Kansas City Chiefs (2018)*
- * Offseason or practice squad member only

Awards and highlights
- First-team All-American (2015); First-team All-Big Ten (2015); Rose Bowl champion (2013)
- Stats at Pro Football Reference

Jack Allen (born September 24, 1992) is an American former professional football center. He played college football for Michigan State. His younger brother Brian Allen was the 111th overall pick in the fourth round of the 2018 NFL draft by the Los Angeles Rams.

== Early life and college ==
Allen attended Hinsdale Central High School in Hinsdale, Illinois. He was also a State Champion in wrestling while in high school. He received first-team Associated Press All-American honors in 2015 while playing for the Michigan State Spartans football team. That season, Allen scored a touchdown on a hand-off against Penn State.

== Professional career ==
Pre-draft measurables
Height	Weight	Arm length	Hand span	40-yard dash	10-yard split	20-yard split	20-yard shuttle	Three-cone drill	Vertical jump	Broad jump	Bench press
6 ft 1 1/4 in (1.86 m)	294 lb (133 kg)	32 1/4 in (0.82 m)	10 1/8 in (0.26 m)	5.29 s	1.84 s	3.06 s	4.73 s	7.90 s	26.5 in (0.67 m)	8 ft 5 in (2.57 m)	23 reps
All values from NFL Combine

=== New Orleans Saints ===
On April 30, 2016, Allen signed an undrafted free agent deal with the New Orleans Saints after going undrafted in the 2016 NFL draft. On September 3, 2016, he was waived by the Saints and was signed to the practice squad. Allen was promoted to the active roster on December 10, 2016.

On August 23, 2017, Allen was waived/injured by the Saints and placed on injured reserve.

=== Chicago Bears ===
On July 28, 2018, Allen signed with the Chicago Bears. He was waived on August 4, 2018.

=== Kansas City Chiefs ===
On August 5, 2018, Allen was claimed off waivers by the Kansas City Chiefs, but was waived two days later.
