= Brian Allen (offensive lineman) =

American football player (born 1995)

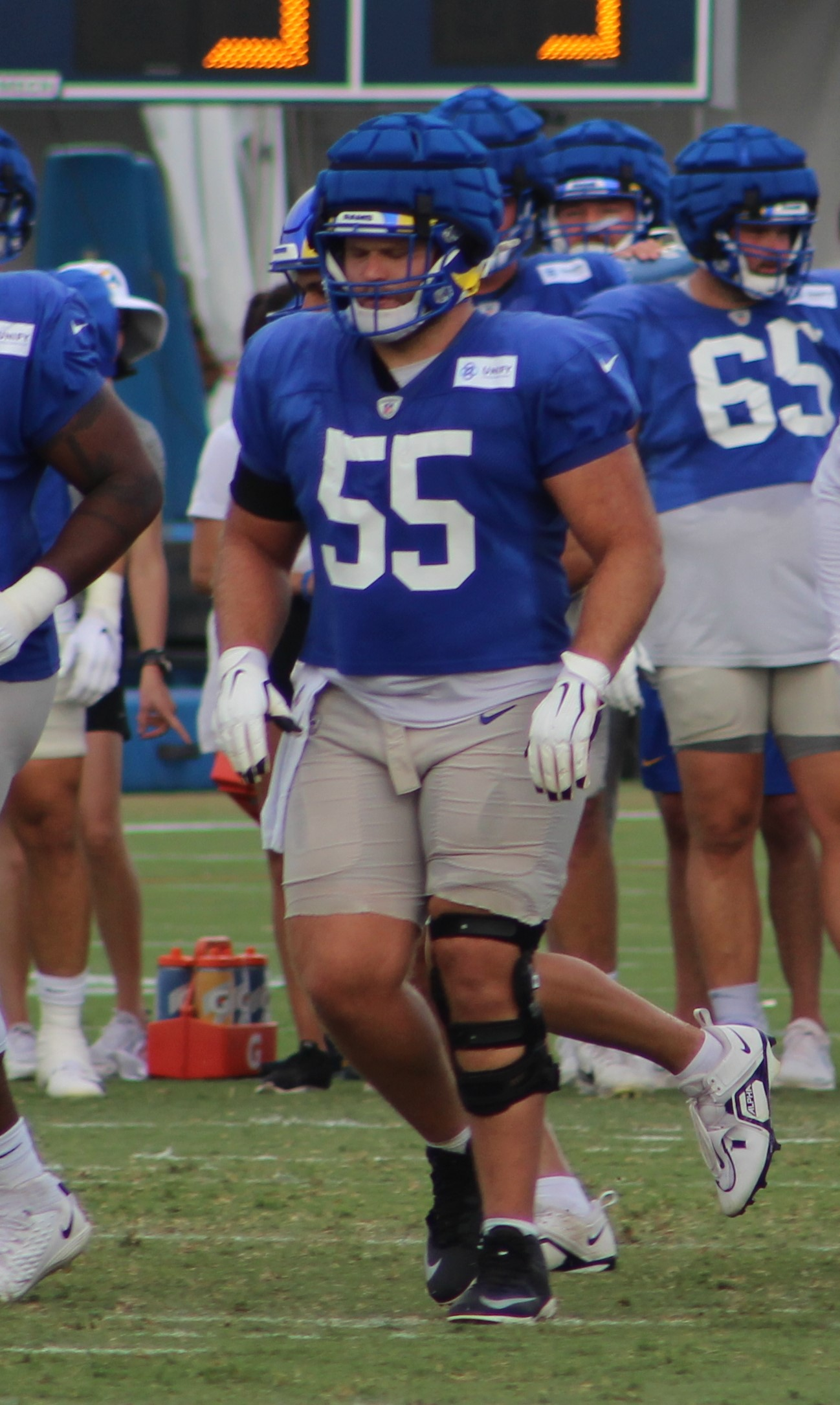
- Allen with the Los Angeles Rams in 2023

Los Angeles Rams
- Title: Assistant offensive line coach

Personal information
- Born: October 11, 1995 (age 31); Hinsdale, Illinois, U.S.
- Listed height: 6 ft 2 in (1.88 m)
- Listed weight: 303 lb (137 kg)

Career information
- Position: Center (No. 55)
- High school: Hinsdale Central
- College: Michigan State (2014–2017)
- NFL draft: 2018: 4th round, 111th overall pick

Career history

Playing
- Los Angeles Rams (2018–2023); Cleveland Browns (2024)*
- * Offseason or practice squad member only

Coaching
- Los Angeles Rams (2026–present) Assistant offensive line coach

Awards and highlights
- Super Bowl champion (LVI); 2× Second-team All-Big Ten (2015, 2016)

Career NFL statistics
- Games played: 50
- Games started: 32
- Stats at Pro Football Reference

Brian Allen (born October 11, 1995) is an American professional football coach and former center who is currently the assistant offensive line coach for the Los Angeles Rams of the National Football League (NFL). Allen played in the NFL for seven seasons, mainly for the Rams. He played college football for the Michigan State Spartans. He was selected by the Rams in the fourth round of the 2018 NFL draft.

== College career ==
After starring for Hinsdale Central High School, Allen was recruited to play college football for Michigan State University. Allen played with his older brother and his younger brother during his collegiate career. He was a three time all-Big Ten Conference selection as well as a Freshman All-American.

== Professional playing career ==
Pre-draft measurables
Height	Weight	Arm length	Hand span	Wingspan	40-yard dash	10-yard split	20-yard split	20-yard shuttle	Three-cone drill	Vertical jump	Broad jump	Bench press
6 ft 1 1/8 in (1.86 m)	298 lb (135 kg)	32 3/8 in (0.82 m)	9 1/4 in (0.23 m)	6 ft 4 3/4 in (1.95 m)	5.34 s	1.81 s	3.10 s	4.71 s	7.81 s	26.5 in (0.67 m)	8 ft 3 in (2.51 m)	27 reps
All values from NFL Combine

=== Los Angeles Rams ===
Allen was selected by the Los Angeles Rams in the fourth round (111th overall) of the 2018 NFL draft, using the pick acquired in the Robert Quinn trade. He played in 13 games his rookie year as a backup.

In 2019, Allen was named the starting center following the departure of veteran John Sullivan. He started the first nine games before suffering an MCL injury in Week 10. He was placed on injured reserve on November 12, 2019. On April 15, 2020, the Rams announced that Allen was the first NFL player to test positive for COVID-19. Allen would ultimately miss the 2020 season due to injury.

In 2021, Allen had his best season to date, starting 16 out of 17 games during the regular season and all four playoff games, helping the Rams reach Super Bowl LVI where they would defeat the Cincinnati Bengals 23–20. He was also named as a Pro Bowl alternate following the regular season, but did not participate due to playing in the Super Bowl.

On March 14, 2022, Allen signed a three-year extension with the Rams worth $24 million. Allen struggled with knee and thumb injuries that limited him to only five games during the 2022 season.

Prior to the 2023 season, Allen sat out due to injury and was replaced by teammate Coleman Shelton for the starting center position. He appeared in five games for the Rams during the season with no starts.

On February 21, 2024, Allen was released by the Rams.

=== Cleveland Browns ===
On May 6, 2024, Allen signed with the Cleveland Browns. He was placed on injured reserve on July 29 and released with an injury settlement of August 3.

On March 5, 2025, Allen announced his retirement from the NFL.

== Professional coaching career ==
On February 23, 2026, Allen joined the coaching staff of the Los Angeles Rams as an assistant offensive line coach under head coach Sean McVay.

== Personal life ==
His older brother Jack is also a center who signed a free agent deal with the New Orleans Saints in 2016. He also has a younger brother, Matt, who he also played with at Michigan State. All 3 brothers were Illinois high school HWT state wrestling champions.
