= William Likely =

American football player (born 1994)

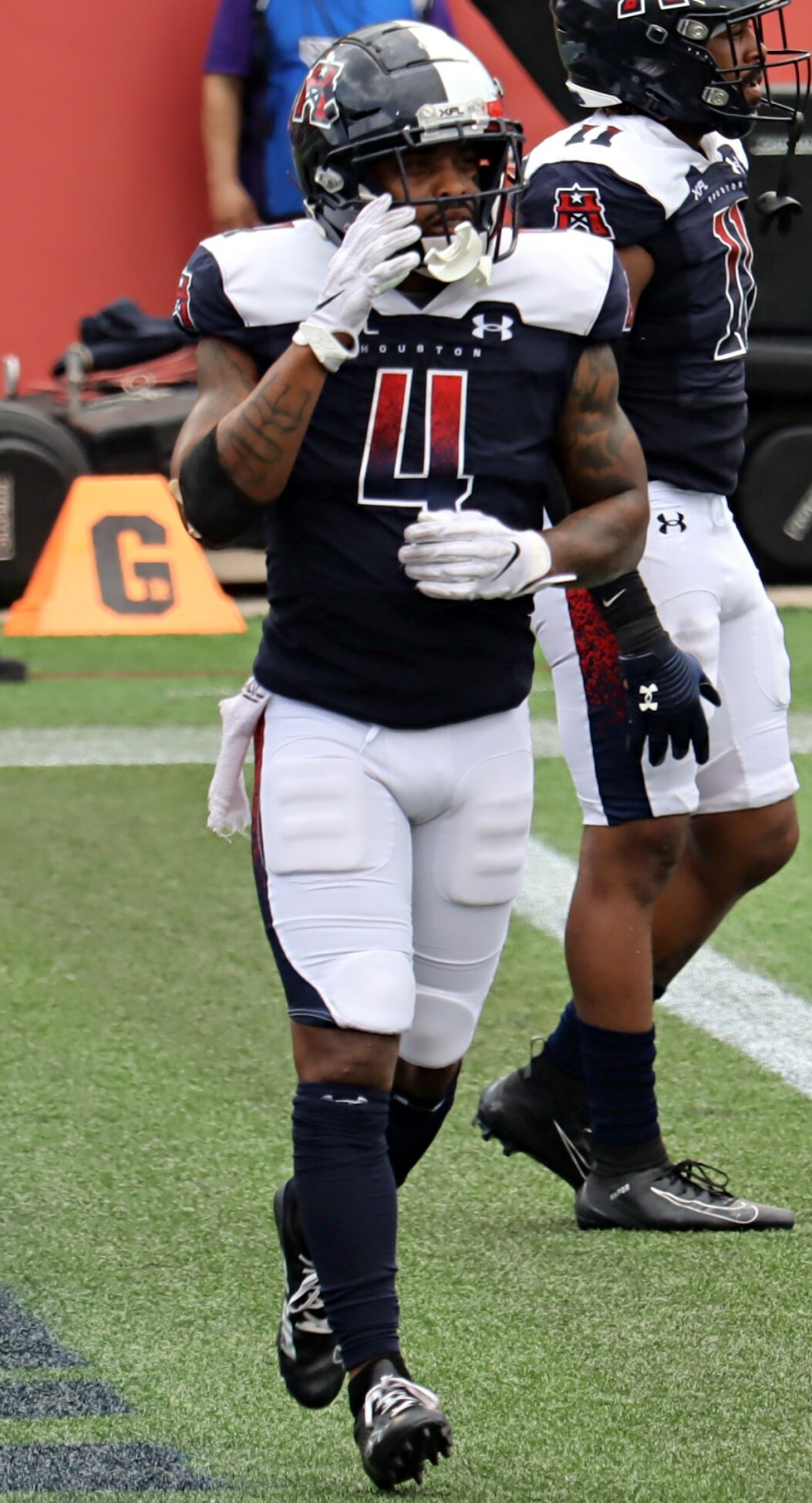
- Likely with the Houston Roughnecks in 2023

No. 33, 4
- Position: Cornerback

Personal information
- Born: September 13, 1994 (age 32); Belle Glade, Florida, U.S.
- Listed height: 5 ft 7 in (1.70 m)
- Listed weight: 179 lb (81 kg)

Career information
- High school: Glades Central (Belle Glade, Florida)
- College: Maryland (2013–2016)
- NFL draft: 2017: undrafted

Career history
- New England Patriots (2017)*; Toronto Argonauts (2018); Hamilton Tiger-Cats (2019); DC Defenders (2020)*; TSL Jousters (2021); Houston Gamblers (2022); Houston Roughnecks (2023); Memphis Showboats (2024)*
- * Offseason or practice squad member only

Awards and highlights
- All-USFL Team (2022); Big Ten Return Specialist of the Year (2015); 2× First-team All-Big Ten (2014, 2015)

William Likely III (born September 13, 1994) is an American former professional football cornerback. He played college football at the University of Maryland.

On September 5, 2015 Likely broke a 76 year old Big Ten Conference single-game record when he returned 8 punts for 233 yards in the season opener against Richmond. He was selected by both the coaches and media as a first-team return specialist and also a first-team defensive back by the coaches on the 2015 All-Big Ten team.

== College career ==
Likely played for the Maryland Terrapins from 2013 to 2016.

Maryland career records

- Single-season interception return yards (170, 2014)
- Single-season interceptions returned for a touchdown (2, 2014)
- Single-game kickoff return yards (228 yards vs. Michigan State, 2014)
- Single-game punt return yards (233 yards vs. Richmond, 2015)
- Co-longest kickoff return average in a season (31.0 yards, 2014)
- Co-longest kickoff return (100 yards vs. Stanford, 2014)

== Professional career ==
=== New England Patriots ===
Likely signed with the Patriots as an undrafted free agent on June 5, 2017. He was waived on September 2, 2017.

=== Toronto Argonauts ===
The Toronto Argonauts signed Likely to their practice squad on August 21, 2018.

=== Hamilton Tiger-Cats ===
Likely was signed to the Hamilton Tiger-Cats' practice roster on June 18, 2019. He was promoted to the active roster on July 12, and demoted to the practice roster on July 31. He was promoted again on September 19, and demoted again on September 26. He was released from the practice roster after the season on November 26, 2019.

=== DC Defenders ===
Likely signed with the DC Defenders of the XFL during mini-camp in December 2019. He was waived during final roster cuts on January 22, 2020.

=== Houston Gamblers ===
Likely was selected in the 9th round of the 2022 USFL draft by the Houston Gamblers.

=== Houston Roughnecks ===
The Houston Roughnecks selected Likely in the first round of the 2023 XFL Supplemental Draft on January 1, 2023. The Roughnecks brand was transferred to the Houston Gamblers when the XFL and USFL merged to create the United Football League (UFL).

=== Memphis Showboats ===
Likely was selected by the Memphis Showboats in the seventh round of the Super Draft portion during the 2024 UFL dispersal draft on January 15, 2024. He signed with the team on January 25. He was released on March 10, 2024.
