= Maliek Collins =

American football player (born 1995)

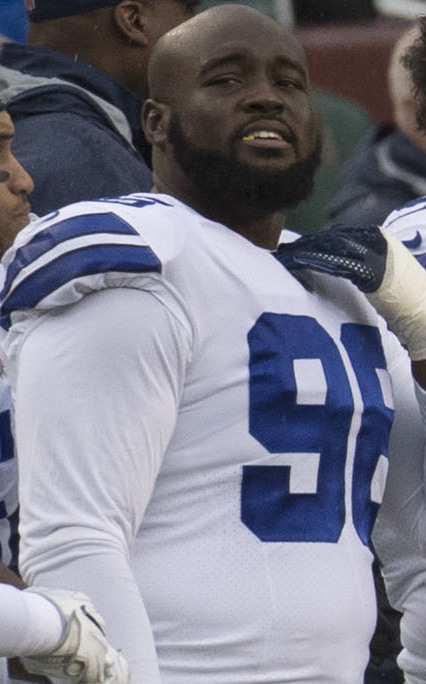
- Collins with the Dallas Cowboys in 2017

No. 96 – Cleveland Browns
- Position: Defensive tackle
- Roster status: Active

Personal information
- Born: April 8, 1995 (age 31); Kansas City, Kansas, U.S.
- Listed height: 6 ft 2 in (1.88 m)
- Listed weight: 310 lb (141 kg)

Career information
- High school: Center (Kansas City)
- College: Nebraska (2013–2015)
- NFL draft: 2016: 3rd round, 67th overall pick

Career history
- Dallas Cowboys (2016–2019); Las Vegas Raiders (2020); Houston Texans (2021–2023); San Francisco 49ers (2024); Cleveland Browns (2025–present)

Awards and highlights
- 2× Second-team All-Big Ten (2014, 2015)

Career NFL statistics as of 2025
- Total tackles: 264
- Sacks: 37.0
- Forced fumbles: 1
- Fumble recoveries: 9
- Pass deflections: 4
- Interceptions: 1
- Stats at Pro Football Reference

Maliek Collins Sr. (born April 8, 1995) is an American professional football defensive tackle for the Cleveland Browns of the National Football League (NFL). He played college football for the Nebraska Cornhuskers and has previously played in the National Football League (NFL) for the Dallas Cowboys, Las Vegas Raiders, Houston Texans, and San Francisco 49ers.

== Early life ==
Collins was born on April 8, 1995, in Kansas City, Kansas, to Janice Davis and C.W. Collins, a mechanic. He has two older sisters. His father C.W. died of a heart attack when Collins was 6 years old.

Collins attended Center High School in Kansas City, Missouri, where he was an outstanding athlete in both American football and wrestling. As a junior, he had a 48–5 record in wrestling and advanced to the state quarterfinals. As a senior, he compiled a perfect 48–0 record in wrestling and won the state championship. As a senior defensive tackle he posted 102 tackles (43 for loss), 15 sacks and 5 forced fumbles.

He accepted a scholarship from the University of Nebraska to play college football.

== College career ==
As a freshman, he played in 12 games as a backup defensive lineman. The next year, he was named a starter at defensive tackle, leading the team in tackles for loss with 14, while finishing second on the team with 4.5 sacks and 13 quarterback pressures. He also had 45 tackles (17 solo).

In his junior season, he started 12 games at nose tackle, where he faced more double teams, registering 29 tackles (7 for loss), 2.5 sacks and 6 quarterback pressures.

After his junior season, Collins decided to forgo his senior year and enter the 2016 NFL draft. He finished his college career with 8 sacks, 19 quarterback pressures and 23 tackles for loss.

=== College statistics ===
Nebraska Cornhuskers
| Season | | | Tackling | | | | | Interceptions | | | | | Fumbles | | | |
| Year | Class | GP | Tkls | Solo | Asst | Loss | Sack | Int | Yds | TD | Lng | PD | FF | FR | Yds | TD |
| 2013 | FR | 6 | 12 | 6 | 6 | 1.5 | 1.0 | 0 | 0 | 0 | 0 | 0 | 1 | 0 | 0 | 0 |
| 2014 | SO | 13 | 45 | 17 | 28 | 13.0 | 4.5 | 0 | 0 | 0 | 0 | 0 | 0 | 0 | 0 | 0 |
| 2015 | JR | 13 | 29 | 14 | 15 | 7.0 | 2.5 | 0 | 0 | 0 | 0 | 1 | 0 | 0 | 0 | 0 |
| NCAA total | | 32 | 86 | 37 | 49 | 21.5 | 8.0 | 0 | 0 | 0 | 0 | 1 | 1 | 0 | 0 | 0 |

== Professional career ==
=== Pre-draft ===
Coming out of college, Collins was projected by some analysts to be a second or third round selection.

Pre-draft measurables
| Height | Weight | Arm length | Hand span | Wingspan | 40-yard dash | 10-yard split | 20-yard split | 20-yard shuttle | Three-cone drill | Vertical jump | Broad jump | Bench press |
|---|---|---|---|---|---|---|---|---|---|---|---|---|
| 6 ft 1 7/8 in (1.88 m) | 311 lb (141 kg) | 33 1/8 in (0.84 m) | 9 1/2 in (0.24 m) | 6 ft 8 7/8 in (2.05 m) | 5.03 s | 1.79 s | 2.91 s | 4.52 s | 7.53 s | 29.5 in (0.75 m) | 9 ft 1 in (2.77 m) | 25 reps |
All values from NFL Combine

=== Dallas Cowboys ===
==== 2016 season ====
Collins was selected by the Dallas Cowboys in the third round (67th overall) of the 2016 NFL draft. On July 13, 2016, the Cowboys signed Collins to a four-year, $3.22 million contract with $887,545 guaranteed and a signing bonus of $881,152. He was the last remaining Cowboys player of the 2016 draft class to be signed. He suffered a broken right foot during the first week of organized team activities, he was placed on the physically unable to perform list and missed most of the preseason.

Collins began his rookie season as the fourth defensive tackle on the depth chart behind the veterans Tyrone Crawford, Terrell McClain and Cedric Thornton. Although he made his professional regular season debut in the Cowboys’ season-opening loss to the New York Giants, he did not record a statistic.

The improved play he showed in the second game of the season against the Washington Redskins made the Cowboys decide in the fourth quarter to move Crawford to left defensive end and keep Collins as the full-time one-technique tackle, where he was playing out of position. He finished the game with three combined tackles and multiple quarterback hurries. The following week, Collins earned his first career start at defensive tackle and made two combined tackles in the Cowboys' 31–17 defeat over the Chicago Bears.

On November 9, 2016, Collins made his first career sack on Cleveland Browns' quarterback Cody Kessler. He made 3 tackles and 2 sacks in the 35–10 victory. He started at the three-technique tackle position against the Bears, 49ers, Bengals and Packers.

During a Week 13 win over the Minnesota Vikings, Collins made two combined tackles and sacked Sam Bradford for his third of the season. On December 18, 2016, Collins made one solo tackle, and sacked Tampa Bay Buccaneers quarterback Jameis Winston causing a forced fumble, the first of his career, helping the Cowboys win 26–20. In his rookie season, he started 14 of 16 games, making 31 tackles, 5 sacks (second on the team), 14 quarterback pressures (third on the team), one forced fumble and one fumble recovery.

==== 2017 season ====
In Week 2 against the Denver Broncos, Collins's teammate DeMarcus Lawrence forced a fumble off of quarterback Trevor Siemian. The fumble was recovered by Collins and helped set up the Cowboys on a touchdown-scoring drive in the 42–17 loss.

In Week 3 against the Arizona Cardinals, he had his second career multi-sack game with two, along with 5 tackles and 2 quarterback pressures. In the fifth game, he moved from under tackle to nose tackle, after David Irving returned from his suspension.

Collins started all 16 games, posting 18 tackles (3 for loss), 2.5 sacks (third on the team), 25 quarterback pressures (third on the team) and 2 fumble recoveries.

Although he did not miss a game, he had a surgery to address a stress reaction in his left foot during the offseason, which bothered him from the sixth game of the season on.

According to the Cowboys coaches' breakdown, Collins had 18 tackles, 2.5 sacks, three tackles for loss, 25 quarterback pressures and two fumble recoveries in 2017.

==== 2018 season ====
On May 14, 2018, Collins underwent foot surgery to repair a fifth metatarsal fracture in his left foot suffered during an offseason workout, and was ruled out until August.

Collins injured his knee in the second game against the Giants and missed three contests. His first start of the season came in the eighth game against the Tennessee Titans, making a season-best 5 tackles with one for a loss.

He appeared in 13 games with 9 starts. He totaled 16 tackles, 4 tackles for loss (tied for third on the team), 3 sacks (fifth on the team), 20 quarterback pressures (fourth on the team) and one fumble recovery.

==== 2019 season ====
He started all 16 games, making 16 tackles, 4 sacks (tied for third on the team), 30 quarterback pressures (third on the team) and one fumble recovery. In the fifth game against the Philadelphia Eagles, he had a season-high 5 tackles (2 solo) and added one fumble recovery.

=== Las Vegas Raiders ===
On March 30, 2020, Collins signed a one-year contract with the Las Vegas Raiders, reuniting with defensive line coach Rod Marinelli, who was his defensive coordinator with the Cowboys.

Collins was placed on the reserve/COVID-19 list by the team on November 18, and activated three days later. He played in 10 games before being placed on injured reserve on December 4, 2020. On December 26, 2020, Collins was activated off of injured reserve. He appeared in 12 games with 11 starts, registering 15 tackles and no sacks.

=== Houston Texans ===
On March 23, 2021, Collins signed a one-year contract with the Houston Texans. He started 15 games, recording 29 tackles, along with 2.5 sacks (tied for fifth on the team), 9 tackles for loss, one interception, one pass defensed and one fumble recovery.

On March 18, 2022, Collins signed a two-year contract extension with the Texans. He started 15 games, posting 37 tackles, 3.5 sacks and 2 passes defensed. He had two sacks against the Miami Dolphins.

On June 20, 2023, Collins signed a two-year, $23 million contract extension with the Texans. He started 16 games, collecting a career-high 41 tackles, 5 sacks and one pass defensed. He had two sacks games against the Carolina Panthers and the Tennessee Titans.

=== San Francisco 49ers ===
On March 14, 2024, Collins was traded by the Texans to the San Francisco 49ers in exchange for the first of the 49ers' two seventh-round picks in the 2024 NFL draft (No. 232, which Houston traded to the Minnesota Vikings). He started all 17 games for San Francisco, recording 2 fumble recoveries, 5 sacks, 12 quarterback hits, and 33 combined tackles.

On March 12, 2025, Collins was released by the 49ers.

=== Cleveland Browns ===
On March 13, 2025, Collins signed a two-year, $20 million contract with the Cleveland Browns. He started in all 12 of his appearances for the team, recording one fumble recovery, 6.5 sacks, and 25 combined tackles. In Week 13 against the 49ers, Collins suffered a season-ending quad injury. He was placed on injured reserve on December 2.

On October 24, 2026, Collins signed a two-year, $30 million contract extension with the Browns.

== NFL career statistics ==
Legend
| **Bold** | Career high |

=== Regular season ===
| Year | Team | Games | | Tackles | | | | | Interceptions | | | | | | Fumbles | | | |
| Year | Team | GP | GS | Cmb | Solo | Ast | Sck | TFL | PD | Int | Yds | Avg | Lng | TD | FF | FR | Yds | TD |
|---|---|---|---|---|---|---|---|---|---|---|---|---|---|---|---|---|---|---|
| 2016 | DAL | 16 | 14 | 23 | 17 | 6 | 5.0 | 5 | 0 | — | — | — | — | — | **1** | 1 | 0 | 0 |
| 2017 | DAL | 16 | 16 | 22 | 10 | 12 | 2.5 | 4 | 0 | — | — | — | — | — | 0 | **2** | **6** | 0 |
| 2018 | DAL | 13 | 9 | 19 | 12 | 7 | 3.0 | 5 | 0 | — | — | — | — | — | 0 | 1 | 0 | 0 |
| 2019 | DAL | 16 | 16 | 20 | 15 | 5 | 4.0 | 6 | 0 | — | — | — | — | — | 0 | 1 | 0 | 0 |
| 2020 | LV | 12 | 11 | 15 | 8 | 7 | 0.0 | 0 | 0 | — | — | — | — | — | 0 | 0 | 0 | 0 |
| 2021 | HOU | 15 | 15 | 29 | 18 | 11 | 2.5 | **9** | 1 | **1** | 0 | 0.0 | 0 | 0 | 0 | 1 | 0 | 0 |
| 2022 | HOU | 15 | 15 | 37 | **27** | 10 | 3.5 | **9** | **2** | — | — | — | — | — | 0 | 0 | 0 | 0 |
| 2023 | HOU | 16 | 16 | **41** | 19 | **22** | 5.0 | 8 | 1 | — | — | — | — | — | 0 | 0 | 0 | 0 |
| 2024 | SF | **17** | **17** | 33 | 20 | 13 | 5.0 | 5 | 0 | — | — | — | — | — | 0 | **2** | 0 | 0 |
| 2025 | CLE | 12 | 12 | 25 | 15 | 10 | **6.5** | 7 | 0 | — | — | — | — | — | 0 | 1 | 0 | 0 |
| Career | | 148 | 141 | 264 | 161 | 103 | 37.0 | 58 | 4 | 1 | 0 | 0.0 | 0 | 0 | 1 | 9 | 6 | 0 |

=== Postseason ===
| Year | Team | Games | | Tackles | | | | | Interceptions | | | | | | Fumbles | | | |
| Year | Team | GP | GS | Cmb | Solo | Ast | Sck | TFL | PD | Int | Yds | Avg | Lng | TD | FF | FR | Yds | TD |
|---|---|---|---|---|---|---|---|---|---|---|---|---|---|---|---|---|---|---|
| 2016 | DAL | 1 | 1 | 0 | 0 | 0 | 0.0 | 0 | 0 | — | — | — | — | — | 0 | 0 | 0 | 0 |
| 2018 | DAL | **2** | **2** | **10** | **6** | **4** | **1.0** | **2** | 0 | — | — | — | — | — | 0 | 0 | 0 | 0 |
| 2023 | HOU | **2** | **2** | 2 | 2 | 0 | 0.0 | 1 | 0 | — | — | — | — | — | 0 | 0 | 0 | 0 |
| Career | | 5 | 5 | 12 | 8 | 4 | 1.0 | 3 | 0 | 0 | 0 | 0.0 | 0 | 0 | 0 | 0 | 0 | 0 |
