= Andy Janovich =

American football player (born 1993)

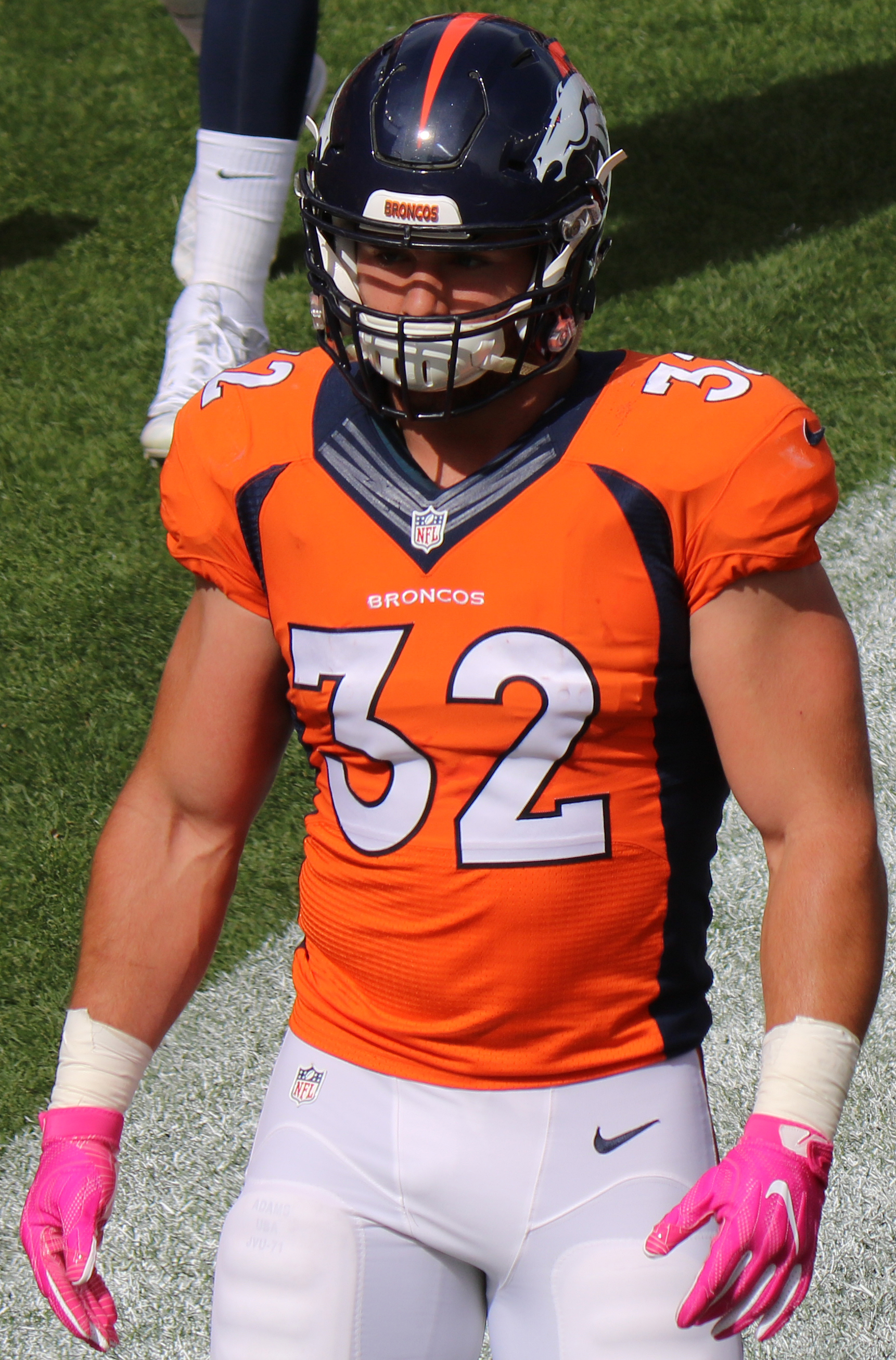
- Janovich with the Denver Broncos in 2019

No. 32, 31
- Position: Fullback

Personal information
- Born: May 23, 1993 (age 33); Gretna, Nebraska, U.S.
- Listed height: 6 ft 1 in (1.85 m)
- Listed weight: 238 lb (108 kg)

Career information
- High school: Gretna
- College: Nebraska (2012–2015)
- NFL draft: 2016: 6th round, 176th overall pick

Career history
- Denver Broncos (2016–2019); Cleveland Browns (2020–2021); Houston Texans (2022)*
- * Offseason or practice squad member only

Career NFL statistics
- Rushing yards: 55
- Rushing average: 3.2
- Rushing touchdowns: 4
- Receptions: 27
- Receiving yards: 255
- Receiving touchdowns: 1
- Stats at Pro Football Reference

Andy Janovich (born May 23, 1993) is an American former professional football player who was a fullback in the National Football League (NFL). He played college football for the Nebraska Cornhuskers, and was selected in the sixth round of the 2016 NFL draft by the Denver Broncos. Janovich played for the Broncos, Cleveland Browns, and Houston Texans.

Janovich played the entirety of his rookie contract with the Broncos before he was traded to the Browns during the 2020 NFL offseason, where he played with the Browns for 2 seasons (Janovich had previously signed a contract extension to remain with Denver during the 2019 season). He signed with the Texans as a free agent in the 2022 NFL offseason and was released prior to the start of the regular season. Janovich retired from professional football in January 2023 after not playing during the 2022 season.

== Early life ==
Janovich attended and played high school football at Gretna High School.

== College career ==
Janovich played college football at the University of Nebraska–Lincoln, where he spent the majority of his playing time on special teams and alternating at fullback with C. J. Zimmerer, primarily in blocking roles. His touches were few and far between until the 2015 season, where he was fourth in total rushing yards with 265 rushing yards (6.3 yards per carry), 3 rushing touchdowns, and two receptions for 58 yards; he also led the team on special teams tackles with 13 (11 solo).

== Professional career ==
=== Pre-draft ===
Janovich was one of four Nebraska Cornhuskers and one of five fullbacks to attend the NFL Scouting Combine in Indianapolis, Indiana. He tied Northwestern's Dan Vitale for first in the bench press among all running backs. On March 4, 2016, he participated at Nebraska's pro day, but opted to not perform drills and only meet with team representatives and scouts. At the conclusion of the pre-draft process, Janovich was projected to be a seventh round pick or a priority undrafted free agent. He was ranked as the seventh best fullback in the draft by NFLDraftScout.com.

Pre-draft measurables
Height	Weight	Arm length	Hand span	40-yard dash	10-yard split	20-yard split	20-yard shuttle	Three-cone drill	Vertical jump	Broad jump	Bench press
6 ft 1 in (1.85 m)	238 lb (108 kg)	31 5/8 in (0.80 m)	9 3/4 in (0.25 m)	4.81 s	1.62 s	2.75 s	4.32 s	7.28 s	34 in (0.86 m)	9 ft 11 in (3.02 m)	30 reps
All values from NFL Combine

=== Denver Broncos ===
==== 2016 ====
The Denver Broncos selected Janovich in the sixth round (176th overall) of the 2016 NFL draft. He was the first of three fullbacks selected in 2016. On May 13, 2016, the Broncos signed Janovich to a four-year, $2.5 million contract that included a signing bonus of $164,309.

Throughout training camp, he competed against veteran Juwan Thompson for the starting fullback position. He made his professional regular season debut in the Broncos' season-opener against the Carolina Panthers and scored a 28-yard touchdown on his first career carry during the 21–20 victory. On September 25, 2016, he earned his first career start and had one carry for two-yards during a 29–17 victory over the Cincinnati Bengals. On November 30, 2016, Janovich was placed on injured reserve after having ankle surgery. He finished the 2016 season with four carries for 33 rushing yards in 11 games and five starts.

==== 2017–2019 ====
Janovich entered the 2017 season slated as the starting fullback under new head coach Vance Joseph. On October 22, 2017, he had one carry for a three-yard gain and caught the first two passes of his career for 14 yards during a 21–0 loss to the Los Angeles Chargers. On December 10, 2017, he scored a one-yard rushing touchdown in the Broncos' 23–0 win over the New York Jets. In the 2017 season, he finished with six carries for 12 rushing yards and a rushing touchdown to go along with four receptions for 35 receiving yards.

In 2018, Janovich played all 16 games (7 starts), recording eight receptions for 112 yards with one touchdown and rushing twice for five yards. On December 30, 2018, Janovich caught his first career receiving touchdown on a 20-yard pass from quarterback Case Keenum in a loss to the Chargers.

On October 11, 2019, Janovich signed a three-year, $5.7 million contract extension with the Broncos. In Week 11, Janovich suffered a dislocated elbow injury and was ruled out for the rest of the year. He was placed on injured reserve on November 19. He appeared in seven games and recorded five receptions for 42 receiving yards and had one rushing touchdown.

=== Cleveland Browns ===
Janovich was traded to the Cleveland Browns on March 20, 2020, in exchange for the Browns' seventh-round pick in the 2021 NFL draft. He was placed on the reserve/COVID-19 list by the team on November 16, 2020, and activated on November 30.

On October 12, 2021, Janovich was placed on injured reserve. He was activated on November 6.

=== Houston Texans ===
On March 25, 2022, Janovich signed with the Houston Texans. He was released on August 21, 2022.

Janovich announced his retirement from the NFL on January 2, 2023.

== Personal life ==
Janovich is the son of Ron and Brenda Janovich. He was raised in Gretna, Nebraska and attended Gretna High School, where he starred in football and wrestling. In 2010–2011, Janovich won the Nebraska Class B 189-pound title, with a 53–0 record. In 2011–2012, Janovich won the 220-pound title, finishing at 46–0. Andy is of Lithuanian, German, and Irish descent. Andy married his college girlfriend, Madison McConkey, in February 2018. Madison filed for divorce July 25, 2024.

After his retirement from football, Janovich started a roofing company sporting his name, Andy Janovich Roofing, stylizing the "N" in the middle of his surname to callback to his alma mater. The company does a variety of roofing services, but is prolific in their advertising for emergency and storm damage repairs.
