= Alex Lewis (offensive lineman) =

American football player (born 1992)

No. 71
- Position: Offensive guard

Personal information
- Born: April 21, 1992 (age 34); Tempe, Arizona, U.S.
- Listed height: 6 ft 6 in (1.98 m)
- Listed weight: 305 lb (138 kg)

Career information
- High school: Phoenix (AZ) Mountain Pointe
- College: Nebraska
- NFL draft: 2016: 4th round, 130th overall pick

Career history
- Baltimore Ravens (2016–2018); New York Jets (2019–2020)

Awards and highlights
- Second-team All-Big Ten (2015)

Career NFL statistics
- Games played: 44
- Games started: 39
- Stats at Pro Football Reference

Alex Lewis (born April 21, 1992) is an American former professional football player who was an offensive guard in the National Football League (NFL). He played college football for the Nebraska Cornhuskers, and was selected by the Baltimore Ravens in the fourth round of the 2016 NFL draft.

== College career ==
Lewis started his career with Colorado, playing all 12 games as a true freshman in 2011 at tackle and tight end before moving to guard. He played all of the 2012 season at left guard.

After the 2012 season, Lewis transferred to Nebraska, where his father, Bill Lewis, was an All-American center. He sat out the 2013 season due to transfer rules and started all games for Nebraska in 2014 and 2015.

== Professional career ==
Pre-draft measurables
Height	Weight	Arm length	Hand span	Wingspan	40-yard dash	10-yard split	20-yard split	20-yard shuttle	Three-cone drill	Vertical jump	Broad jump	Bench press
6 ft 6 in (1.98 m)	312 lb (142 kg)	34 in (0.86 m)	10 in (0.25 m)	6 ft 9 1/4 in (2.06 m)	5.22 s	1.84 s	3.03 s	4.72 s	7.94 s	29.5 in (0.75 m)	8 ft 9 in (2.67 m)	27 reps
All values from NFL Combine/Pro Day

=== Baltimore Ravens ===
The Baltimore Ravens selected Lewis with the 130th overall pick in the fourth round of the 2016 NFL draft. He played in 10 games with 8 starts at guard for the Ravens before missing the last six weeks of the season with a sprained ankle.

On August 10, 2017, during the Ravens first preseason games, Lewis suffered a shoulder injury that required surgery, causing him to miss the entire 2017 season. He was placed on injured reserve on September 1, 2017.

On October 14, 2018, Lewis was carted off field with a suspected serious neck injury. He only missed two games and returned in Week 9.

=== New York Jets ===
On August 5, 2019, Lewis was traded to the New York Jets for a conditional seventh round draft pick in the 2020 NFL draft. After beginning the season as a backup, he was named the starting left guard in Week 5 following an injury to Kelechi Osemele. He started 12 games before being placed on injured reserve on December 28, 2019.

On March 21, 2020, Lewis signed a three-year, $18.6 million contract extension with the Jets. He started nine games at left guard before being placed on the reserve/non-football injury list on December 4, 2020. He was designated to return and began practicing with the team again on December 30, but the team did not activate him before the end of the season.

On August 6, 2021, Lewis was placed on the left squad list after injuring his head during practice. He announced his retirement on August 18.
