= Zach Sterup =

American football player (born 1992)

No. 71, 74
- Position: Offensive tackle

Personal information
- Born: May 14, 1992 (age 34); Hastings, Nebraska, U.S.
- Listed height: 6 ft 9 in (2.06 m)
- Listed weight: 318 lb (144 kg)

Career information
- High school: St. Cecilia (Hastings)
- College: Nebraska
- NFL draft: 2016: undrafted

Career history
- Kansas City Chiefs (2016)*; New York Jets (2016)*; Cleveland Browns (2016–2017)*; Miami Dolphins (2017–2019)
- * Offseason or practice squad member only

Career NFL statistics
- Games played: 12
- Games started: 2
- Stats at Pro Football Reference

Zach Sterup (born May 14, 1992) is an American former professional football player who was an offensive tackle in the National Football League (NFL). He played college football for the Nebraska Cornhuskers.

== Professional career ==
=== Kansas City Chiefs ===
Sterup signed with the Kansas City Chiefs as an undrafted free agent on May 10, 2016. He was waived by the Chiefs on September 3, 2016. He was re-signed to the practice squad on November 2, 2016, but was released six days later.

=== New York Jets ===
On November 9, 2016, Sterup was signed to the New York Jets' practice squad. He was released on November 29, 2016.

=== Cleveland Browns ===
On December 5, 2016, Sterup was signed to the Cleveland Browns' practice squad. He signed a reserve/future contract with the Browns on January 2, 2017.

On September 7, 2017, Sterup was waived by the Browns and was re-signed to the practice squad.

=== Miami Dolphins ===
On November 8, 2017, Sterup was signed by the Miami Dolphins off the Browns' practice squad.

On September 1, 2019, Sterup was waived by the Dolphins and re-signed to the practice squad. He was released on September 10.
