= Vincent Valentine (American football) =

American football player (born 1994)

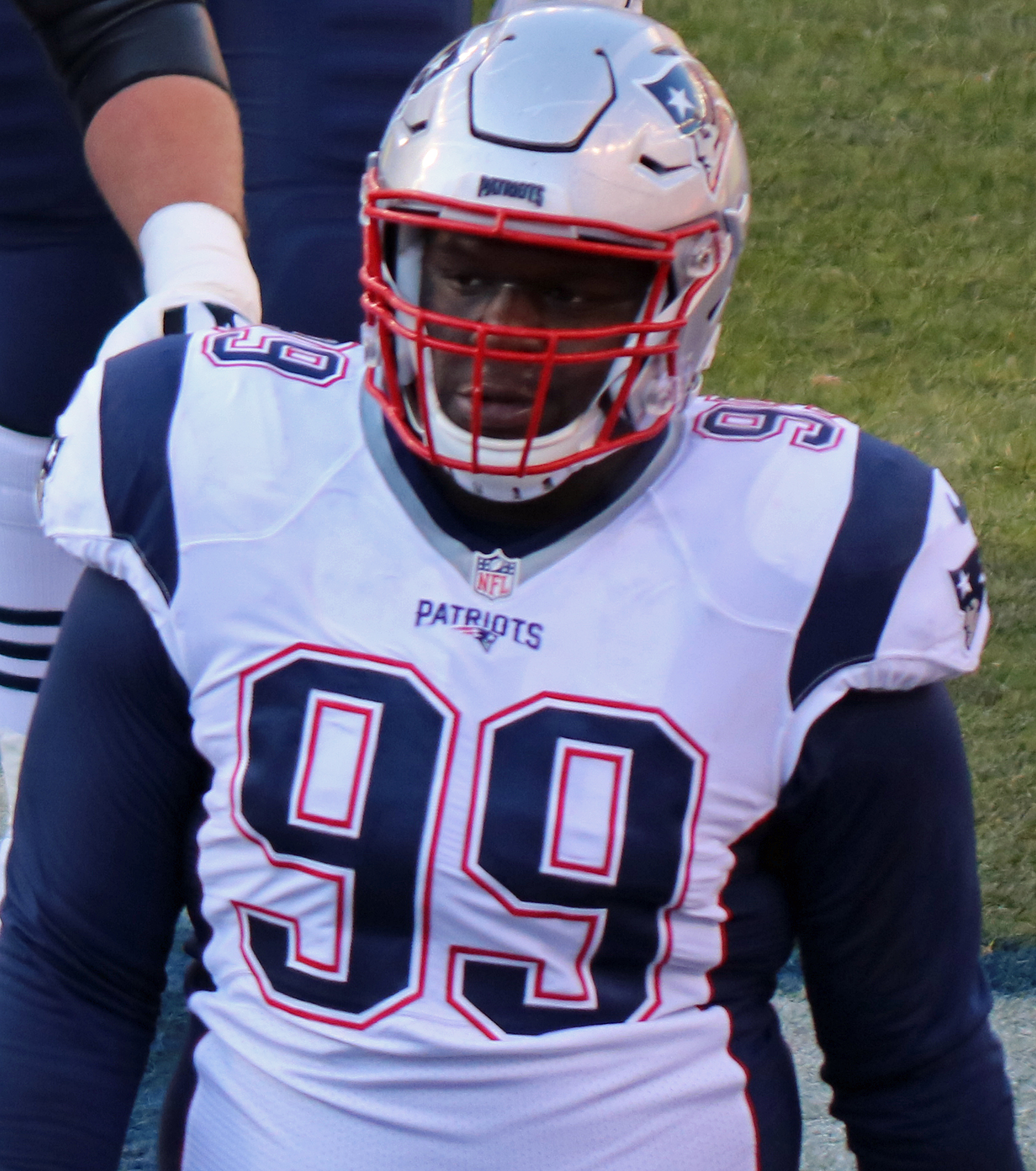
- Valentine with the New England Patriots in 2016

No. 96, 99
- Position: Defensive tackle

Personal information
- Born: February 23, 1994 (age 32); Madison, Illinois, U.S.
- Listed height: 6 ft 4 in (1.93 m)
- Listed weight: 331 lb (150 kg)

Career information
- High school: Edwardsville (Edwardsville, Illinois)
- College: Nebraska (2012–2015)
- NFL draft: 2016: 3rd round, 96th overall pick

Career history
- New England Patriots (2016–2018); Arizona Cardinals (2018)*; Seattle Seahawks (2018)*; Arizona Cardinals (2018)
- * Offseason or practice squad member only

Awards and highlights
- Super Bowl champion (LI)

Career NFL statistics
- Total tackles: 20
- Sacks: 1
- Stats at Pro Football Reference

Vincent Valentine (born February 23, 1994) is an American former professional football player who was a defensive tackle in the National Football League (NFL) for the New England Patriots and Arizona Cardinals. He was selected by the Patriots in the third round of the 2016 NFL draft after playing college football for the Nebraska Cornhuskers. He was also a member of the Seattle Seahawks but did not appear in any games for them.

== College career ==
Valentine played college football for the Nebraska Cornhuskers from 2013 to 2015. He was redshirted in 2012. He declared for the NFL draft after his redshirt junior year in 2015.

== Professional career ==
Pre-draft measurables
Height	Weight	Arm length	Hand span	40-yard dash	10-yard split	20-yard split	20-yard shuttle	Three-cone drill	Vertical jump	Broad jump	Bench press
6 ft 3 5/8 in (1.92 m)	329 lb (149 kg)	33 1/8 in (0.84 m)	9 5/8 in (0.24 m)	5.19 s	1.77 s	2.99 s	4.59 s	8.03 s	29 in (0.74 m)	9 ft 2 in (2.79 m)	17 reps
All values from NFL Combine

=== New England Patriots ===
Valentine was selected by the Patriots in the third round, 96th overall, in the 2016 NFL draft. Valentine entered training camp competing to be a backup defensive tackle with Markus Kuhn, Woodrow Hamilton, Joe Vellano, and Anthony Johnson. He won the backup job and began the regular season as the Patriot's primary backup defensive tackle behind veteran starting defensive tackles Malcom Brown and Alan Branch.

Valentine made his professional debut in the season opener against the Arizona Cardinals, where he recorded his first career sack against quarterback Carson Palmer.

On February 5, 2017, Valentine was part of the Patriots team that won Super Bowl LI. In the game, the Patriots defeated the Atlanta Falcons by a score of 34–28 in overtime.

On September 22, 2017, the Patriots placed Valentine on injured reserve after dealing with a knee injury. The Patriots made it to Super Bowl LII without Valentine, but lost 41–33 to the Philadelphia Eagles.

On September 1, 2018, Valentine was waived by the Patriots and was signed to the practice squad the next day. He was released on October 8, 2018.

=== Arizona Cardinals (first stint) ===
On October 31, 2018, Valentine was signed to the Arizona Cardinals practice squad. He was released on November 27, 2018.

=== Seattle Seahawks ===
On December 4, 2018, Valentine was signed to the Seattle Seahawks practice squad after a tryout the previous day.

=== Arizona Cardinals (second stint) ===
On December 11, 2018, Valentine was signed by the Cardinals off the Seahawks practice squad. He was waived/injured on August 7, and reverted to injured reserve after clearing waivers on August 8. He was waived from injured reserve on August 30, 2019.

== Personal life ==
In college, he was a journalism major, and earned a spot on the Nebraska Scholar-Athlete Honor Roll in the spring of 2013. Valentine also volunteered his time with Uplifting Athletes and part of team hospital visits while with the Huskers.
