= Nate Gerry =

American football player (born 1995)

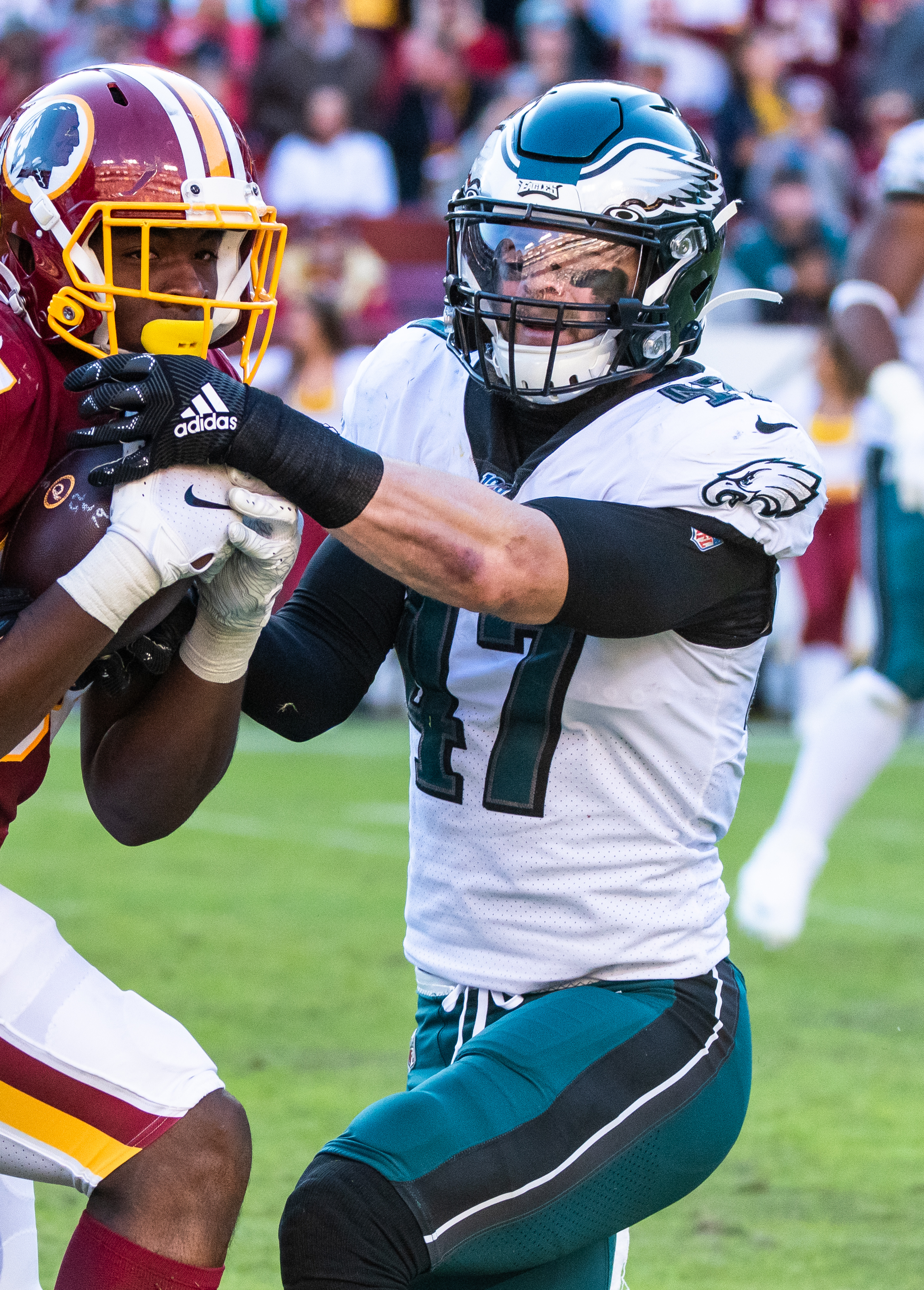
- Gerry (right) with the Philadelphia Eagles in 2019

Profile
- Position: Linebacker

Personal information
- Born: February 23, 1995 (age 31); Sioux Falls, South Dakota, U.S.
- Listed height: 6 ft 2 in (1.88 m)
- Listed weight: 230 lb (104 kg)

Career information
- High school: Washington (Sioux Falls)
- College: Nebraska
- NFL draft: 2017: 5th round, 184th overall pick

Career history
- Philadelphia Eagles (2017–2020); San Francisco 49ers (2021)*; Washington Commanders (2022)
- * Offseason or practice squad member only

Awards and highlights
- Super Bowl champion (LII); Second-team All-Big Ten (2014); Third-team All-Big Ten (2016)

Career NFL statistics
- Total tackles: 163
- Sacks: 3.5
- Fumble recoveries: 1
- Interceptions: 3
- Defensive touchdowns: 1
- Stats at Pro Football Reference

Nathan Gerry (born February 23, 1995) is an American professional football linebacker. He played college football at Nebraska and was drafted by the Philadelphia Eagles in the fifth round of the 2017 NFL draft. He has also been a member of the San Francisco 49ers and Washington Commanders.

== Early life ==
Gerry grew up in Sioux Falls, South Dakota, and played high school football and ran track for Washington High School. Gerry was the 200-meter high school champion in South Dakota during his junior and senior years and set a state-record 21.52 seconds. As a senior, Gerry also won the 100 meter race. In his senior year playing football, Gerry had 64 tackles, including 13 tackles for loss, eight pass breakups, five interceptions and two forced fumbles. He committed to play college football at the University of Nebraska–Lincoln.

== College career ==
In Gerry's freshman year he had 32 tackles, including 18 stops. In Gerry's sophomore season he switched from linebacker to safety. Gerry started every game and led the Huskers with five interceptions and was second on the team for tackles with 88. Gerry started every game in 2015 and led the Huskers with 79 tackles and 4 interceptions. He also had 7 pass breakups. In 2016, Gerry was named Third-team All-Big Ten Conference by the coaches and Second-team All-Big Ten by the media.

He was ruled ineligible for his final game with the Huskers, the Music City Bowl versus Tennessee Volunteers.

== Professional career ==
Pre-draft measurables
Height	Weight	Arm length	Hand span	40-yard dash	Vertical jump	Broad jump	Bench press
6 ft 1 7/8 in (1.88 m)	218 lb (99 kg)	31 1/4 in (0.79 m)	9 1/4 in (0.23 m)	4.58 s	30.5 in (0.77 m)	10 ft 2 in (3.10 m)	17 reps
All values from NFL Combine

=== Philadelphia Eagles ===
Gerry was drafted by the Philadelphia Eagles in the fifth round, 184th overall, in the 2017 NFL draft. He signed a four-year rookie contract with the Eagles on May 12, 2017. He was waived on September 2, 2017 and was signed to the Eagles' practice squad the next day. He was promoted to the active roster on October 19, 2017. On February 4, 2018, Gerry won Super Bowl LII with the Eagles.

In week 5 of the 2019 season against the New York Jets, Gerry recorded an interception off Luke Falk and returned it for a 51 yard touchdown in the 31–6 win. In week 11 against the New England Patriots, Gerry recorded a team high 10 tackles and sacked Tom Brady once in the 17–10 loss.

Gerry was placed on the reserve/COVID-19 list by the Eagles on July 29, 2020. He was activated on August 9, 2020. He was placed on injured reserve on October 30, 2020 with an ankle injury.

=== San Francisco 49ers ===
On March 29, 2021, Gerry signed a one-year contract with the San Francisco 49ers. He was released with an injury waiver on July 6, 2021. He was re-signed to the practice squad on September 8, 2021, but was released on November 2, 2021.

=== Washington Commanders ===
Gerry signed with the Washington Commanders on August 7, 2022. He was placed on injured reserve on August 23, 2022, and was released with an injury settlement two days later. He signed with the Commanders' practice squad on November 3. On January 4, 2023, he was signed to the active roster.

Gerry signed a one-year contract extension on March 1, 2023, but was released on May 23, 2023.
