= 2015 Rutgers Scarlet Knights football team =

American college football season

2015 Rutgers Scarlet Knights football
- Conference: Big Ten Conference
- East Division
- Record: 4–8 (1–7 Big Ten)
- Head coach: Kyle Flood (4th season; first 2 games); Norries Wilson (next 3 games); Kyle Flood (remainder of season)
- Offensive coordinator: Ben McDaniels (1st season)
- Offensive scheme: Pro-style
- Defensive coordinator: Joe Rossi (2nd season)
- Base defense: 4–3
- Home stadium: High Point Solutions Stadium

2015 Big Ten Conference football standings
	Conf.			Overall
Team	W		L	W		L
East Division
No. 6 Michigan State xy$^	7	–	1	12	–	2
No. 4 Ohio State x	7	–	1	12	–	1
No. 12 Michigan	6	–	2	10	–	3
Penn State	4	–	4	7	–	6
Indiana	2	–	6	6	–	7
Rutgers	1	–	7	4	–	8
Maryland	1	–	7	3	–	9
West Division
No. 9 Iowa xy	8	–	0	12	–	2
No. 23 Northwestern	6	–	2	10	–	3
No. 21 Wisconsin	6	–	2	10	–	3
Nebraska	3	–	5	6	–	7
Minnesota	2	–	6	6	–	7
Illinois	2	–	6	5	–	7
Purdue	1	–	7	2	–	10
Championship: Michigan State 16, Iowa 13
^ – College Football Playoff participant; $ – Conference champion; x – Division champion/co-champions; y – Championship game participant; Rankings from AP Poll

The 2015 Rutgers Scarlet Knights football team represented Rutgers University in the 2015 NCAA Division I FBS football season. It is the Scarlet Knights' second season as a member of the Big Ten Conference, and second as a member of the East Division. The team was led by Kyle Flood, in his fourth year as head coach, and played its home games at High Point Solutions Stadium in Piscataway, New Jersey.

The season began with controversies over an investigation into violations of NCAA regulations and school policy concerning coach Flood's improper contacting of a professor concerning a student's academic status; and the arrests and dismissal of several football players on violent felony charges connected to an April 2015 home invasion robbery in New Brunswick. Coach Flood was suspended for three games after the investigation found improper contact was made.

== Before the season ==
=== Controversies and legal issues ===
The 2015 football season began with the shadow of several incidents of alleged misconduct and criminal charges. On May 24, 2015, redshirt freshman defensive back Darian Dailey was arrested in Florida on felony robbery charges. In late August 2015, head coach Kyle Flood suspended five players from the first half of the season opener for violating team policies on breaking curfews. These players were Ruhann Peele (cornerback), Leonte Carroo (receiver), Tim Gleeson (punter), Chris Laviano (quarterback) and Kevin Marquez (linebacker). There were doubts that Flood would be coaching the season opener and some speculation amongst news media and fans about the possibility of Flood's firing or resignation. Around this time, many fans had called for the return of Flood's predecessor, Greg Schiano as head coach. According to The Asbury Park Press, students remarked that the recent controversies tarnish the university's reputation.

On September 3, 2015, ten suspects, including six players, were arrested and charged with felony assault, armed robbery, criminal restraint, conspiracy, riot, and weapons possession charges stemming from an April 26, 2015 incident in New Brunswick, New Jersey characterized as a home invasion robbery. One victim, identified only as a 19-year-old male Rutgers student was reported to have had his jaw broken in the assault. Five players—Ruhann Peele (cornerback), Nadir Barnwell (cornerback), Razohnn Gross (fullback), Delon Stephenson (free safety), and Andre Boggs (cornerback)—were dismissed from the team moments before the season-opening football game against the Norfolk State Spartans. Former player Tejay Johnson (free safety and wide receiver), was also arrested on September 3. A sixth player, Lloyd Terry (fullback) was arrested a few days later. Several of the players arrested in this incident had previous arrests in 2013 and 2014 for other criminal charges.

One of the suspects, Barnwell, was the center of an ongoing investigation into head coach Kyle Flood for possible violations of school policy and National Collegiate Athletic Association (NCAA) regulations prohibiting the athletic coaching staff from contacting faculty regarding the academic eligibility status of a player. According to New Jersey Advance Media, publisher of the Star-Ledger and other statewide newspapers, Flood defied academic support staff by contacting one of Barnwell's professors and that sources stated that Flood attempted to "circumvent the process and trying to get the kid eligible".

Flood suspended wide receiver Leonte Carroo indefinitely after his arrest on September 13, 2015. Carroo was arrested by the Rutgers University Police Department and charged with simple assault stemming from a domestic violence incident that occurred on campus shortly after the end of the game against Washington State. Carroo was the seventh Rutgers player arrested in ten days. Star-Ledger and New Jersey Advance Media sports columnist Steve Politi described Carroo as "another casualty of the season from hell" and called the incident further proof that Flood had lost control of the team. Politi mused, "you wonder how soon before his head coach joins him on the list"—implying that Flood's tenure as coach should be ending with his termination.

The 15-member Rutgers Board of Governors, one of the school's two governing bodies, and university president Robert Barchi met on September 11 in a closed-door emergency session to discuss ongoing "athletic matters" and the potential for litigation in the wake of these controversies and arrests. On September 16, 2015, after the conclusion of a university-led investigation into his conduct determined he improperly contacted a professor to get Barnwell's grade changed, Flood was suspended for three games and fined $50,000 by Rutgers president Robert Barchi. Flood would be suspended during and miss an away game against Penn State (September 19, 2015), and home games against Kansas (September 26) and Michigan State (October 10). Associate head coach Norries Wilson would fill-in as head coach for those three games during Flood's suspension.

After Flood's reinstatement, questions continued to circulate about possible drug problems within the program in the wake of former Scarlet Knights' fullback Lloyd Terry telling police that "he failed multiple drug tests while on the football team".

Flood, along with athletic director Julie Herman, was fired at the end of the season.

== Coaching staff ==
=== Coaching changes ===
2014 offensive coordinator Ralph Friedgen relinquished his position as offensive coordinator due to age and stayed on as a special assistant to the head coach.

Ben McDaniels, 2014 wide receiver coach and brother of former Denver Broncos head coach and current New England Patriots offensive coordinator Josh McDaniels, was promoted to offensive coordinator.

2014 graduate assistant and former Rutgers defensive lineman Charlie Noonan was hired as defensive line coach at Holy Cross.

Graduate assistant Sam Williams' two years of graduate assistant-ship expired and was hired by Penn State working with special teams and recruiting quality control.

2014 Graduate assistant and former Rutgers quarterback Mike Teel was hired by his alma mater Don Bosco Preparatory High School as offensive coordinator

2014 undergraduate student assistant Sean Barowski stayed on as a graduate assistant upon graduating.

=== 2015 staff ===
Name	Position	Seasons at Rutgers	Alma mater
Kyle Flood	Head coach	10	Iona College (1992)
Norries Wilson	Running backs/associate head coach/interim head coach	4	Minnesota (1989)
Ben McDaniels	Offensive coordinator	1 (first as OC)	Kent State (2003)
Joe Rossi	Defensive coordinator	4	Allegheny College (2000)
Phil Galiano	Special teams/tight ends	10	Shippensburg University (1999)
Mitch Browning	Offensive line	1	Capital University (1979)
Anthony Campanile	Wide receivers	4	Rutgers (2004)
Jim Panagos	Defensive line	4	Maryland (1992)
Bob Fraser	Linebackers	5	Allegheny College
Darrell Wilson	Defensive backs	4	Connecticut (1981)
Jeremy Cole	Strength and conditioning/assistant AD	9	University of Findlay (2005)
Rocco Dimeco	Offensive assistant	1	Norwich University
Scott Vallone	Defensive assistant	0	Rutgers (2012)
Sean Barowski	Graduate assistant	0	Rutgers (2015)
Ralph Friedgen	Special assistant to the head coach	1	Maryland

== Schedule ==
Rutgers announced their 2015 football schedule on June 3, 2013. The 2015 schedule consist of 7 home, and 5 away games in the regular season. The Scarlet Knights hosted Big Ten foes Maryland, Michigan State, Ohio State, and Nebraska and traveled to Indiana, Michigan, Penn State, and Wisconsin.

The Scarlet Knights hosted three of their four non conference games against Kansas, Norfolk State and Washington State. Rutgers matched up against Army on November 21 at Michie Stadium at West Point.

Date	Time	Opponent	Site	TV	Result	Attendance
September 5	12:00 pm	Norfolk State*	High Point Solutions Stadium; Piscataway, NJ	ESPNews	W 63–13	47,453
September 12	3:30 pm	Washington State*	High Point Solutions Stadium; Piscataway, NJ	ESPNU	L 34–37	46,536
September 19	8:00 pm	at Penn State	Beaver Stadium; University Park, PA	BTN	L 3–28	103,323
September 26	12:00 pm	Kansas*^{†}	High Point Solutions Stadium; Piscataway, NJ	BTN	W 27–14	46,136
October 10	8:00 pm	No. 4 Michigan State	High Point Solutions Stadium; Piscataway, NJ	BTN	L 24–31	50,373
October 17	3:30 pm	at Indiana	Memorial Stadium; Bloomington, IN	BTN	W 55–52	40,567
October 24	8:00 pm	No. 1 Ohio State	High Point Solutions Stadium; Piscataway, NJ	ABC	L 7–49	53,111
October 31	12:00 pm	at Wisconsin	Camp Randall Stadium; Madison, WI	BTN	L 10–48	74,575
November 7	3:30 pm	at No. 16 Michigan	Michigan Stadium; Ann Arbor, MI	BTN	L 16–49	108,879
November 14	3:30 pm	Nebraska	High Point Solutions Stadium; Piscataway, NJ	BTN	L 14–31	45,606
November 21	12:00 pm	at Army*	Michie Stadium; West Point, NY	CBSSN	W 31–21	30,113
November 28	12:00 pm	Maryland	High Point Solutions Stadium; Piscataway, NJ	BTN	L 41–46	44,846
*Non-conference game; ^{†}Homecoming; Rankings from AP Poll released prior to game; All times are in Eastern time

Schedule source:

== Game summaries ==
=== Norfolk State ===
	1	2	3	4	Total
Spartans	7	6	0	0	13
Scarlet Knights	7	14	28	14	63

On September 5, 2015, the Rutgers Scarlet Knights met the Norfolk State Spartans, a Football Championship Subdivision team in the Mid-Eastern Athletic Conference, for the fourth game in their series. Rutgers had won the previous three games against Norfolk State in which the Scarlet Knights outscored the Spartans 128–0.

=== Washington State ===
	1	2	3	4	Total
Cougars	7	6	7	17	37
Scarlet Knights	0	6	6	22	34

After last season's 41–38 victory against Washington State (Pac-12 Conference) on August 28, 2014, this was the second meeting between the Scarlet Knights and the Cougars. Rutgers lost after a penalty-prone fourth quarter (ending with a spike on 4th down), 34–37.

=== At Penn State ===
	1	2	3	4	Total
Scarlet Knights	0	0	0	3	3
Nittany Lions	0	21	0	7	28

In the first game of head coach Kyle Flood's three-game suspension, associate head coach Norries Wilson filled in as head coach for the Rutgers and Penn State conference opener. Rutgers' only score was posted with 10:35 remaining in the fourth quarter by kicker Kyle Federico who made 34 yard field goal.

=== Kansas ===
	1	2	3	4	Total
Jayhawks	0	7	7	0	14
Scarlet Knights	7	13	7	0	27

This was the first meeting between the Kansas Jayhawks (Big-12 Conference) and the Scarlet Knights. In 2012, Rutgers and Kansas announced two home-and-home series games this season and the 2018 season.

=== No. 4 Michigan State ===
	1	2	3	4	Total
No. 4 Spartans	7	3	14	7	31
Scarlet Knights	0	14	7	3	24

Rutgers hosted the undefeated Michigan State Spartans for their sixth meeting. With Michigan State ranked number 4 in national polls, it was the first time in 6 seasons that Rutgers met a team ranked the top 25 (beating No 23-ranked USF 31–0 on November 12, 2009) and 8 seasons since they upset a No. 2-ranked South Florida in 2007.

This was the last game that interim head coach Norries Wilson coached during head coach Kyle Flood's three-game suspension.

=== At Indiana ===
	1	2	3	4	Total
Scarlet Knights	7	20	6	22	55
Hoosiers	10	14	28	0	52

Despite a 52–27 Indiana lead in the third quarter, the Scarlet Knights erased the 25-point deficit by converting three fourth-quarter turnovers into touchdowns and took the lead in the game's final seconds with a 26-yard field goal from Kyle Federico. Leonte Carroo caught seven passes, for 157 yards and three touchdowns before leaving in the second half with an injured right leg.

=== No. 1 Ohio State ===
	1	2	3	4	Total
No. 1 Buckeyes	7	14	21	7	49
Scarlet Knights	0	0	0	7	7

=== At Wisconsin ===
	1	2	3	4	Total
Scarlet Knights	3	0	7	0	10
Badgers	10	17	14	7	48

=== At No. 17 Michigan ===
	1	2	3	4	Total
Scarlet Knights	3	13	0	0	16
No. 17 Wolverines	14	21	11	3	49

=== Nebraska ===
	1	2	3	4	Total
Cornhuskers	14	7	7	3	31
Scarlet Knights	0	7	7	0	14

=== At Army ===
	1	2	3	4	Total
Scarlet Knights	14	10	7	0	31
Black Knights	0	14	7	0	21

=== Maryland ===
	1	2	3	4	Total
Terrapins	0	13	14	19	46
Scarlet Knights	7	24	7	3	41

== Roster ==
2015 Rutgers Scarlet Knights football team roster
Players
Coaches
Offense

Pos.	#	Name	Class
WR	1	Janarion Grant	Jr
WR	3	Jawuan Harris	Fr
WR	4	Leonte Carroo	Sr
QB	5	Chris Laviano	So
RB	6	Desmond Peoples	Jr
RB	7	Robert Martin	So
RB	8	Josh Hicks	So
QB	11	Hayden Rettig	Jr
WR	13	Carlton Agudosi	Jr
QB	15	Jack Clements	Fr
WR	16	Christopher Parker	Fr
QB	17	Giovanni Rescigno	Fr
QB	18	Michael Dare	Fr
QB	19	Troy Anthony	Jr
RB	21	Charles Snorweah	Fr
FB	30	Conor Dowd	Fr
RB	32	Justin Goodwin	Jr
RB	33	Greg Jones	Jr
RB	34	Paul James	Sr
FB	37	Max Anthony	Fr
WR	39	Sandy Anya	So
TE	42	Nick Arcidiacono	Jr
TE	43	George Behr	Fr
FB	44	Sam Bergen	Sr
WR	44	Joseph Gause	Fr
RB	45	Jeffrey Farina	Fr
FB	45	Shaquan Oliver	Fr
TE	46	Charles Scarff	So
TE	48	Anthony Folkerts	Fr
OL	55	Ryan Brodie	Jr
OL	57	Bryan Stonkus	Sr
OL	60	Dorian Miller	So
OL	64	Skiy Pyrame	Fr
OL	65	Tariq Cole	Fr
OL	66	Jacquis Webb	Fr
OL	69	Derrick Nelson	Jr
OL	70	Chris Muller	Jr
OL	71	Marcus Applefield	Fr
OL	72	Manny Taylor	Fr
OL	73	Jonah Jackson	Fr
OL	74	Keith Lumpkin	Sr
OL	75	Zach Venesky	Fr
OL	77	J. J. Denman	Jr
OL	78	Jack Shutack	Fr
OL	79	Zack Heeman	Fr
WR	80	Alex Schoen	So
TE	81	Matt Flanagan	So
WR	82	Ntwademela Perry	Fr
WR	83	Rashad Blunt	Fr
WR	84	John Tsimis	Jr
WR	85	Justice Stewart	Fr
TE	86	Nakia Griffin-Stewart	Fr
WR	87	Vance Matthews	Jr
WR	88	Andre Patton	Jr
WR	89	Dontae Owens	Fr

Defense

Pos.	#	Name	Class
DB	2	Kiy Hester	Fr
LB	3	Steve Longa	Jr
DB	5	Ronnie James	Fr
DB	9	Saquan Hampton	Fr
DB	10	Blessuan Austin	Fr
DB	11	Isaiah Wharton	Fr
LB	14	Kaiwan Lewis	Sr
LB	15	Trevor Morris	Fr
LB	20	Devan Carter	So
DL	22	Quanzell Lambert	Jr
DB	25	Jarius Adams	Fr
LB	26	Deonte Roberts	Fr
LB	28	Najee Clayton	Fr
DB	29	Davon Jacobs	Jr
LB	30	Andre Hunt	So
DB	31	Anthony Cioffi	Jr
LB	34	Talib Abdur-Ra'oof	Fr
LB	35	Eric Margolis	Fr
LB	36	T. J. Taylor	So
DB	37	Zane Campbell	Jr
DL	38	Myles Nash	So
DB	40	Brian Chase	Fr
LB	40	Kevin Marquez	Jr
DB	41	Brian Verbitski	Jr
DB	43	D'Won Walker	Fr
LB	47	Isaiah Johnson	Jr
LB	49	Brandon Russell	Fr
LB	50	Quentin Gause	Sr
DL	51	Sebastian Joseph-Day	So
DL	53	Julian Pinnix-Odrick	Jr
DL	54	Kamaal Seymour	Fr
LB	55	Austin Rosa	Fr
DE	58	Kemoko Turay	So
DL	59	Darnell Davis	So
DL	67	Kenneth Roman	Fr
DL	90	Ron'Dell Carter	Fr
DL	91	Darius Hamilton	Sr
DL	92	Eric Wiafe	Fr
DL	93	Djwany Mera	Sr
DL	95	Jon Bateky	Fr
DL	96	Willington Previlon	Fr
DL	98	Jimmy Hogan	Fr
DL	99	Kevin Wilkins	Fr

Special teams

Pos.	#	Name	Class
PK	1	Kyle Federico	Sr
LS	68	Alex Hutchings	Fr
LS	85	Alan Lucy	So
PK, P	94	Michael Cintron	Fr
PK	94	Chris Gough	Sr
P	96	Aidan Murray	Jr
P	96	Joey Roth	Sr
PK, P	98	David Bonagura	So
P	99	Tim Gleeson	Sr

Head coach

- Kyle Flood

Coordinators/assistant coaches

- Norries Wilson (running backs / associate head coach / interim head coach)
- Ben McDaniels (offensive coordinator)
- Joe Rossi (defensive coordinator)
- Phil Galiano (special teams coordinator / tight ends)
- Mitch Browning (offensive line)
- Anthony Campanile (wide receivers)
- Jim Panagos (defensive line)
- Bob Fraser (linebackers)
- Darrell Wilson (defensive backs)
- Jerry Cole (strength & conditioning / assistant AD)
- Rocco Dimeco (offensive assistant)
- Scott Vallone (defensive assistant)
- Sean Barowski (graduate assistant)
- Ralph Friedgen (special assistant to the head coach)
- Kenny Parker (head football strength and conditioning)
- Sean Barowski (defensive assistant)
- Collin Bauer (defensive assistant)
- David Galante (offensive assistant)
- Mark Rosenbaum (offensive assistant)

Legend

- (C) Team captain
- (S) Suspended
- (I) Ineligible
- Injured
- Redshirt

Roster
Last update: November 23, 2016
