= 2015 Big Ten Conference football season =

- League: NCAA Division I FBS (Football Bowl Subdivision)
- Sport: Football
- Duration: September 3, 2015 through January 2016
- Teams: 14
- TV partner(s): ABC, ESPN2, ESPN Inc., Big Ten Network, FOX (championship game)

2016 NFL Draft
- Top draft pick: Joey Bosa (Ohio State)
- Picked by: San Diego Chargers, 3rd overall

Regular season
- Season MVP: Ezekiel Elliott, Ohio State
- East Division champions: Michigan State, Ohio State (co-champions)
- West Division champions: Iowa
- West Division runners-up: Northwestern

Championship Game
- Champions: Michigan State Spartans
- Runners-up: Iowa Hawkeyes
- Finals MVP: Connor Cook, Michigan State (QB)

Football seasons
- 2014 2016

2015 Big Ten Conference football standings
	Conf.			Overall
Team	W		L	W		L
East Division
No. 6 Michigan State xy$^	7	–	1	12	–	2
No. 4 Ohio State x	7	–	1	12	–	1
No. 12 Michigan	6	–	2	10	–	3
Penn State	4	–	4	7	–	6
Indiana	2	–	6	6	–	7
Rutgers	1	–	7	4	–	8
Maryland	1	–	7	3	–	9
West Division
No. 9 Iowa xy	8	–	0	12	–	2
No. 23 Northwestern	6	–	2	10	–	3
No. 21 Wisconsin	6	–	2	10	–	3
Nebraska	3	–	5	6	–	7
Minnesota	2	–	6	6	–	7
Illinois	2	–	6	5	–	7
Purdue	1	–	7	2	–	10
Championship: Michigan State 16, Iowa 13
^ – College Football Playoff participant; $ – Conference champion; x – Division champion/co-champions; y – Championship game participant; Rankings from AP Poll

The 2015 Big Ten Conference football season was the 120th season of college football play for the Big Ten Conference and was a part of the 2015 NCAA Division I FBS football season. The conference began its season on Thursday, September 3, with Michigan and Minnesota opening their seasons. The remainder of the teams in the conference began their seasons on September 4 and 5.

This was the Big Ten's second season with 14 teams. The league was home to the defending national champion and inaugural winner of the College Football Playoff in Ohio State.

The Big Ten also welcomed four new head coaches for the 2015 season. Jim Harbaugh replaced Brady Hoke as head coach at Michigan, Mike Riley took over for Bo Pelini at Nebraska, Paul Chryst came in as the head man at Wisconsin, replacing Gary Andersen, and Bill Cubit served as the interim head coach at Illinois after Tim Beckman was fired just one week before the beginning of the season. There were also two coaching changes made during the middle of the 2015 season. On October 13, Maryland dismissed coach Randy Edsall and named his offensive coordinator Mike Locksley as interim coach for the rest of the season. On October 28, Jerry Kill retired as Minnesota's head coach due to health concerns. His defensive coordinator Tracy Claeys was named as interim coach before being named the permanent replacement on November 11.

In preseason polling, Ohio State was unanimously voted to repeat as the Big Ten champion by the media in the Big Ten Preseason poll, receiving all 40 first place votes. The Badgers were favorites to win the Big Ten West Division with 32 votes, followed by Nebraska with five and Minnesota with three.

At the conclusion of the regular season, Iowa won the West Division championship with a perfect 12-0 (8-0) record. Michigan State and Ohio State finished tied atop the East Division standings, both at 11-1 (7-1), but Michigan State's head-to-head victory placed the Spartans into the Big Ten Championship Game opposite Iowa. Following the season, Illinois removed the interim tag from Bill Cubit's title and gave him a two-year contract as head coach, while Rutgers has decided to part ways with Kyle Flood.

In the Big Ten Championship Game, Michigan State defeated Iowa 16-13 to win their second Big Ten championship in three years. With the win, the Spartans advance to the College Football Playoff. Iowa and Ohio State were both placed into New Year's Six Bowls, going to the Rose and Fiesta Bowls, respectively. A total of 10 Big Ten teams went to bowl games in 2015, including Nebraska and Minnesota, both with 5-7 records.

== Rankings ==
		Pre	Wk 2	Wk 3	Wk 4	Wk 5	Wk 6	Wk 7	Wk 8	Wk 9	Wk 10	Wk 11	Wk 12	Wk 13	Wk 14	Wk 15	Final
Illinois	AP																
Illinois	C	RV	RV	RV		RV	RV	RV	RV								
Illinois	CFP	Not released															N/A
Indiana	AP																
Indiana	C					RV	RV										
Indiana	CFP	Not released															N/A
Iowa	AP			RV	RV	RV	22	17	12	10	10	8	6	3	4	6	9
Iowa	C			RV	RV	RV	23	17	13	11	11	8	6	3	3	7	10
Iowa	CFP	Not released									9	5	5	4	4	5	N/A
Maryland	AP																
Maryland	C	RV	RV														
Maryland	CFP	Not released															N/A
Michigan	AP	RV				22	18	12	15	15	16	15	14	12	19	17	12
Michigan	C	RV		RV		RV	21	14	18	17	17	15	13	12	19	17	11
Michigan	CFP	Not released									17	14	12	10	15	14	N/A
Michigan State	AP	5	5	4	2	2	4	7	7	6	6	14	9	6	5	3	6
Michigan State	C	6	6	4	3	2	3	4	4	5	6	14	9	6	5	4	6
Michigan State	CFP	Not released									7	13	9	5	5	3	N/A
Minnesota	AP		RV	RV	RV	RV											
Minnesota	C	RV	RV	RV	RV	RV											
Minnesota	CFP	Not released															N/A
Nebraska	AP	RV															
Nebraska	C	RV	RV	RV													
Nebraska	CFP	Not released															N/A
Northwestern	AP		RV	23	17	16	13	20	RV	RV	RV	24	20	17	13	12	23
Northwestern	C		RV	24	19	17	14	21	RV	RV	RV	24	21	17	13	12	22
Northwestern	CFP	Not released									21	18	20	16	14	13	N/A
Ohio State	AP	1	1	1	1	1	1	1	1	1	1	2	2	8	6	7	4
Ohio State	C	1	1	1	1	1	1	1	1	1	1	1	2	8	6	5	4
Ohio State	CFP	Not released									3	3	3	8	6	7	N/A
Penn State	AP	RV						RV			RV						
Penn State	C	RV						RV			RV						
Penn State	CFP	Not released															N/A
Purdue	AP																
Purdue	C																
Purdue	CFP	Not released															N/A
Rutgers	AP																
Rutgers	C																
Rutgers	CFP	Not released															N/A
Wisconsin	AP	20	RV	24	22	19			RV	RV	RV	23	21	RV	25	23	21
Wisconsin	C	18	24	23	21	18	RV	RV	RV	RV	RV	22	20	RV	25	23	21
Wisconsin	CFP	Not released										25	25				N/A

Legend
	Improvement in ranking
	Drop in ranking
	Not ranked previous week
	No change in ranking from previous week
RV	Received votes but were not ranked in Top 25 of poll

== Schedule ==
In 2015, Penn State will be the only Big Ten team that will not play a non-conference game against a Power Five conference team.

Index to colors and formatting
Big Ten member won
Big Ten member lost
Big Ten teams in **bold**

All times Eastern time.

† denotes Homecoming game

=== Week 1 ===
Date	Time	Visiting team	Home team	Site	TV	Result	Attendance	Ref.
September 3	8:30 p.m.	**Michigan**	Utah	Rice-Eccles Stadium • Salt Lake City, UT	FS1	**L** 24–17	47,825	
September 3	9:00 p.m.	No. 2 Texas Christian	**Minnesota**	TCF Bank Stadium • Minneapolis, MN	ESPN	**L** 23–17	54,147	
September 4	7:00 p.m.	No. 5 **Michigan State**	Western Michigan	Waldo Stadium • Kalamazoo, MI	ESPNU	**W** 37–24	30,885	
September 5	12:00 p.m.	No. 21 Stanford	**Northwestern**	Ryan Field • Evanston, IL	ESPN	**W** 16–6	36,024	
September 5	12:00 p.m.	Richmond	**Maryland**	Byrd Stadium • College Park, MD	ESPNU	**W** 50–21	38,117	
September 5	12:00 p.m.	Norfolk State	**Rutgers**	High Point Solutions Stadium • Piscataway, NJ	ESPNNEWS	**W** 63–13	47,453	
September 5	12:00 p.m.	Illinois State	**Iowa**	Kinnick Stadium • Iowa City, IA	BTN	**W** 31–14	59,450	
September 5	2:00 p.m.	Kent State	**Illinois**	Memorial Stadium • Champaign, IL		**W** 52–3	36,693	
September 5	3:30 p.m.	Brigham Young	**Nebraska**	Memorial Stadium • Lincoln, NE	ABC	**L** 33–28	89,959	
September 5	3:30 p.m.	**Penn State**	Temple	Lincoln Financial Field • Philadelphia, PA	ESPN	**L** 27–10	69,176	
September 5	4:00 p.m.	Southern Illinois	**Indiana**	Memorial Stadium • Bloomington, IN	ESPNNEWS	**W** 48–47	36,071	
September 5	8:00 p.m.	No. 20 **Wisconsin**	No. 3 Alabama	AT&T Stadium • Arlington, TX (Cowboys Classic)	ABC	**L** 35–17	64,279	
September 6	3:00 p.m.	**Purdue**	Marshall	Joan C. Edwards Stadium • Huntington, WV	FS1	**L** 41–31	38,791	
September 7	8:00 p.m.	No. 1 **Ohio State**	Virginia Tech	Lane Stadium • Blacksburg, VA	ESPN	**W** 42-24	65,632	
^{#}Rankings from AP Poll released prior to game. All times are in Eastern Time.

=== Week 2 ===
Date	Time	Visiting team	Home team	Site	TV	Result	Attendance	Ref.
September 12	12:00 p.m.	Oregon State	**Michigan**	Michigan Stadium • Ann Arbor, MI	ABC	**W** 35–7	109,651	
September 12	12:00 p.m.	Miami (OH)	**Wisconsin**	Camp Randall Stadium • Madison, WI	ESPNU	**W** 58–0	76,535	
September 12	12:00 p.m.	Buffalo	**Penn State**	Beaver Stadium • University Park, PA	ESPN2	**W** 27–14	93,065	
September 12	12:00 p.m.	Western Illinois	**Illinois**	Memorial Stadium • Champaign, IL	BTN	**W** 44–0	37,733	
September 12	12:00 p.m.	Bowling Green	**Maryland**	Byrd Stadium • College Park, MD	BTN	**L** 48–27	36,332	
September 12	12:00 p.m.	Indiana State	**Purdue**	Ross–Ade Stadium • West Lafayette, IN	ESPNNEWS	**W** 38–14	41,158	
September 12	3:30 p.m.	Hawaii	No. 1 **Ohio State**	Ohio Stadium • Columbus, OH	BTN	**W** 38–0	107,145	
September 12	3:30 p.m.	Washington State	**Rutgers**	High Point Solutions Stadium • Piscataway, NJ	ESPNU	**L** 37–34	46,536	
September 12	3:30 p.m.	**Minnesota**	Colorado State	Hughes Stadium • Fort Collins, CO	CBS Sports Network	**W** 23–20 ^{OT}	32,500	
September 12	4:00 p.m.	Eastern Illinois	**Northwestern**	Ryan Field • Evanston, IL	ESPNNEWS	**W** 41–0	29,131	
September 12	4:30 p.m.	**Iowa**	Iowa State	Jack Trice Stadium • Ames, IA (Cy-Hawk Series)	FOX	**W** 31–17	61,500	
September 12	8:00 p.m.	Florida International	**Indiana**	Memorial Stadium • Bloomington, IN	BTN	**W** 36–22	41,509	
September 12	8:00 p.m.	South Alabama	**Nebraska**	Memorial Stadium • Lincoln, NE	BTN	**W** 48–9	89,822	
September 12	8:00 p.m.	No. 7 Oregon	No. 5 **Michigan State**	Spartan Stadium • East Lansing, MI	ABC	**W** 31–28	76,526	
^{#}Rankings from AP Poll released prior to game. All times are in Eastern Time.

=== Week 3 ===
Date	Time	Visiting team	Home team	Site	TV	Result	Attendance	Ref.
September 19	12:00 p.m.	Air Force	No. 4 **Michigan State**	Spartan Stadium • East Lansing, MI	ABC	**W** 35–21	74,211	
September 19	12:00 p.m.	**Illinois**	North Carolina	Kenan Memorial Stadium • Chapel Hill, NC	ESPN2	**L** 48–14	41,000	
September 19	12:00 p.m.	South Florida	**Maryland**	Byrd Stadium • College Park, MD	ESPNNEWS	**W** 35–17	36,827	
September 19	12:00 p.m.	UNLV	**Michigan**	Michigan Stadium • Ann Arbor, MI	BTN	**W** 28–7	108,683	
September 19	12:00 p.m.	Kent State	**Minnesota**	TCF Bank Stadium • Minneapolis, MN	BTN	**W** 10–7	52,823	
September 19	12:30 p.m.	No. 23 **Northwestern**	Duke	Wallace Wade Stadium • Durham, NC	ESPN3	**W** 19–10	24,127	
September 19	3:30 p.m.	**Nebraska**	Miami (FL)	Sun Life Stadium • Miami Gardens, FL	ABC / ESPN2	**L** 36–33 ^{OT}	53,580	
September 19	3:30 p.m.	Northern Illinois	No. 1 **Ohio State**	Ohio Stadium • Columbus, OH	ABC / ESPN2	**W** 20–13	104,095	
September 19	3:30 p.m.	Virginia Tech	**Purdue**	Ross–Ade Stadium • West Lafayette, IN	ESPNU	**L** 51–24	45,759	
September 19	3:30 p.m.	Troy	No. 24 **Wisconsin**	Camp Randall Stadium • Madison, WI	BTN	**W** 28–3	77,157	
September 19	4:00 p.m.	Western Kentucky	**Indiana**	Memorial Stadium • Bloomington, IN	ESPNNEWS	**W** 38–35	44,823	
September 19	8:00 p.m.	Pittsburgh	**Iowa**	Kinnick Stadium • Iowa City, IA	BTN	**W** 27–24	63,636	
September 19	8:00 p.m.	**Rutgers**	**Penn State**	Beaver Stadium • University Park, PA	BTN	**PSU** 28–3	103,323	
^{#}Rankings from AP Poll released prior to game. All times are in Eastern Time.

=== Week 4 ===
Date	Time	Visiting team	Home team	Site	TV	Result	Attendance	Ref.
September 26†	12:00 p.m.	Kansas	**Rutgers**	High Point Solutions Stadium • Piscataway, NJ	BTN	**W** 27–14	46,136	
September 26	12:00 p.m.	Bowling Green	**Purdue**	Ross–Ade Stadium • West Lafayette, IN	BTN	**L** 35–28	33,160	
September 26	12:00 p.m.	Central Michigan	No. 2 **Michigan State**	Spartan Stadium • East Lansing, MI	BTN	**W** 30–10	75,218	
September 26	12:00 p.m.	No. 22 Brigham Young	**Michigan**	Michigan Stadium • Ann Arbor, MI	ABC	**W** 31–0	108,940	
September 26†	12:00 p.m.	Southern Mississippi	**Nebraska**	Memorial Stadium • Lincoln, NE	ESPNEWS	**W** 36–28	89,899	
September 26	12:30 p.m.	**Indiana**	Wake Forest	BB&T Field • Winston-Salem, NC	ACCN	**W** 31–24	22,508	
September 26	2:00 p.m.	**Maryland**	West Virginia	Milan Puskar Stadium • Morgantown, WV (MD-WV rivalry)	FS1	**L** 45–6	61,174	
September 26	3:30 p.m.	San Diego State	**Penn State**	Beaver Stadium • University Park, PA	BTN	**W** 37–21	95,107	
September 26	3:30 p.m.	Western Michigan	No. 1 **Ohio State**	Ohio Stadium • Columbus, OH	ABC/ESPN2	**W** 38–12	106,123	
September 26	3:30 p.m.	North Texas	**Iowa**	Kinnick Stadium • Iowa City, IA	ESPNU	**W** 62–16	56,401	
September 26†	3:30 p.m.	Ohio	**Minnesota**	TCF Bank Stadium • Minneapolis, MN	BTN	**W** 27–24	53,917	
September 26	4:00 p.m.	Middle Tennessee State	**Illinois**	Memorial Stadium • Champaign, IL	ESPNEWS	**W** 27–25	44,366	
September 26	8:00 p.m.	Ball State	No. 17 **Northwestern**	Ryan Field • Evanston, IL	BTN	**W** 24–19	30,107	
September 26	8:00 p.m.	Hawaii	No. 22 **Wisconsin**	Camp Randall Stadium • Madison, WI	BTN	**W** 28–0	80,829	
^{#}Rankings from AP Poll released prior to game. All times are in Eastern Time.

=== Week 5 ===
Date	Time	Visiting team	Home team	Site	TV	Result	Attendance	Ref.
October 3	12:00 a.m.	No. 22 **Michigan**	**Maryland**	Byrd Stadium • College Park, MD	BTN	**MICH** 28–0	51,802	
October 3	12:00 p.m.	**Iowa**	No. 19 **Wisconsin**	Camp Randall Stadium • Madison, WI (Heartland Trophy)	ESPN	**IA** 10–6	80,933	
October 3†	12:00 p.m.	**Purdue**	No. 2 **Michigan State**	Spartan Stadium • East Lansing, MI	ESPN2	**MSU** 24–21	74,418	
October 3	12:00 p.m.	**Minnesota**	No. 16 **Northwestern**	Ryan Field • Evanston, IL	BTN	**NW** 27–0	30,044	
October 3	12:00 p.m.	Army	**Penn State**	Beaver Stadium • University Park, PA	ESPNU	**W** 20–14	107,387	
October 3	3:30 p.m.	No. 1 **Ohio State**	**Indiana**	Memorial Stadium • Bloomington, IN	ABC/ESPN2	**OSU** 34–27	52,929	
October 3	4:00 p.m.	**Nebraska**	**Illinois**	Memorial Stadium • Champaign, IL	BTN	**ILL** 14–13	40,138	
^{#}Rankings from AP Poll released prior to game. All times are in Eastern Time.

Date	Bye Week
October 3	Rutgers

=== Week 6 ===
Date	Time	Visiting team	Home team	Site	TV	Result	Attendance	Ref.
October 10†	12:00 p.m.	**Indiana**	**Penn State**	Beaver Stadium • University Park, PA	ESPN	**PSU** 29–7	97,873	
October 10†	12:00 p.m.	**Illinois**	No. 22 **Iowa**	Kinnick Stadium • Iowa City, IA	ESPN2	**IA** 29–20	66,693	
October 10†	12:00 p.m.	**Maryland**	No. 1 **Ohio State**	Ohio Stadium • Columbus, OH	BTN	**OSU** 49–28	107,869	
October 10	3:30 p.m.	**Wisconsin**	**Nebraska**	Memorial Stadium • Lincoln, NE (Freedom Trophy)	ABC/ESPN2	**WIS** 23–21	89,886	
October 10†	3:30 p.m.	No. 13 **Northwestern**	No. 18 **Michigan**	Michigan Stadium • Ann Arbor, MI	BTN	**MICH** 38–0	110,452	
October 10	3:30 p.m.	**Minnesota**	**Purdue**	Ross–Ade Stadium • West Lafayette, IN	ESPNU	**MIN** 41–13	33,780	
October 10	8:00 p.m.	No. 4 **Michigan State**	**Rutgers**	High Point Solutions Stadium • Piscataway, NJ	BTN	**MSU** 31–24	50,373	
^{#}Rankings from AP Poll released prior to game. All times are in Eastern Time.

=== Week 7 ===
Date	Time	Visiting team	Home team	Site	TV	Result	Attendance	Ref.
October 17†	12:00 p.m.	**Purdue**	**Wisconsin**	Camp Randall Stadium • Madison, WI	BTN	**WIS** 24–7	80,794	
October 17†	12:00 p.m.	No. 17 **Iowa**	No. 20 **Northwestern**	Ryan Field • Evanston, IL	ABC/ESPN2	**IA** 40–10	44,135	
October 17	3:30 p.m.	**Nebraska**	**Minnesota**	TCF Bank Stadium • Minneapolis, MN ($5 Bits of Broken Chair Trophy)	ESPN2	**NEB** 48–25	52,062	
October 17	3:30 p.m.	No. 7 **Michigan State**	No. 12 **Michigan**	Michigan Stadium • Ann Arbor, MI (Paul Bunyan Trophy)	ESPN	**MSU** 27–23	111,740	
October 17†	3:30 p.m.	**Rutgers**	**Indiana**	Memorial Stadium • Bloomington, IN	BTN	**RUT** 55–52	40,567	
October 17	8:00 p.m.	**Penn State**	No. 1 **Ohio State**	Ohio Stadium • Columbus, OH (OSU-PSU rivalry)	ABC	**OSU** 38–10	108,423	
^{#}Rankings from AP Poll released prior to game. All times are in Eastern Time.

Date	Bye Week	
October 17	Illinois	Maryland

=== Week 8 ===
Date	Time	Visiting team	Home team	Site	TV	Result	Attendance	Ref.
October 24	12:00 p.m.	**Northwestern**	**Nebraska**	Memorial Stadium • Lincoln, NE	ESPN2	**NW** 30–28	89,493	
October 24	3:30 p.m.	**Indiana**	No. 7 **Michigan State**	Spartan Stadium • East Lansing, MI (Old Brass Spittoon)	ABC/ESPN2	**MSU** 52–26	74,144	
October 24	3:30 p.m.	**Penn State**	**Maryland**	M&T Bank Stadium • Baltimore, MD (Maryland-PSU rivalry)	ESPN	**PSU** 31–30	68,948	
October 24†	3:30 p.m.	**Wisconsin**	**Illinois**	Memorial Stadium • Champaign, IL	BTN	**WIS** 24–13	45,438	
October 24	8:00 p.m.	No. 1 **Ohio State**	**Rutgers**	High Point Solutions Stadium • Piscataway, NJ	ABC	**OSU** 49–7	53,111	
^{#}Rankings from AP Poll released prior to game. All times are in Eastern Time.

Date	Bye Week			
October 24	#12 Iowa	#15 Michigan	Minnesota	Purdue

=== Week 9 ===
Date	Time	Visiting team	Home team	Site	TV	Result	Attendance	Ref.
October 31	12:00 p.m.	**Rutgers**	**Wisconsin**	Camp Randall Stadium • Madison, WI	BTN	**WIS** 48–10	74,575	
October 31	12:00 p.m.	**Nebraska**	**Purdue**	Ross–Ade Stadium • West Lafayette, IN	ESPNU	**PUR** 55–45	31,351	
October 31	12:00 p.m.	**Illinois**	**Penn State**	Beaver Stadium • University Park, PA	ESPN2	**PSU** 39–0	94,417	
October 31	3:30 p.m.	**Maryland**	No. 10 **Iowa**	Kinnick Stadium • Iowa City, IA	ABC / ESPN2	**IA** 31–15	62,667	
October 31	7:00 p.m.	No. 15 **Michigan**	**Minnesota**	TCF Bank Stadium • Minneapolis, MN (Little Brown Jug)	ESPN	**MICH** 29–26	50,709	
^{#}Rankings from AP Poll released prior to game. All times are in Eastern Time.

Date	Bye Week			
October 31	Indiana	#6 Michigan State	Northwestern	#1 Ohio State

=== Week 10 ===
Date	Time	Visiting team	Home team	Site	TV	Result	Attendance	Ref.
November 7	12:00 p.m.	**Penn State**	**Northwestern**	Ryan Field • Evanston, IL	ESPNU	**NW** 23–21	34,116	
November 7†	12:00 p.m.	**Illinois**	**Purdue**	Ross–Ade Stadium • West Lafayette, IN (Purdue Cannon)	BTN	**ILL** 48–14	40,197	
November 7	3:30 p.m.	No. 10 **Iowa**	**Indiana**	Memorial Stadium • Bloomington, IN	ESPN	**IA** 35–27	44,739	
November 7	3:30 p.m.	**Wisconsin**	**Maryland**	Byrd Stadium • College Park, MD	BTN	**WIS** 31–24	44,678	
November 7	3:30 p.m.	**Rutgers**	No. 16 **Michigan**	Michigan Stadium • Ann Arbor, MI	BTN	**MICH** 49–16	109,879	
November 7	7:00 p.m.	No. 6 **Michigan State**	**Nebraska**	Memorial Stadium • Lincoln, NE	ESPN	**NEB** 39–38	90,094	
November 7	8:00 p.m.	**Minnesota**	No. 1 **Ohio State**	Ohio Stadium • Columbus, OH	ABC	**OSU** 28–14	108,075	
^{#}Rankings from AP Poll released prior to game. All times are in Eastern Time.

=== Week 11 ===
Date	Time	Visiting team	Home team	Site	TV	Result	Attendance	Ref.
November 14	12:00 p.m.	**Purdue**	No. 24 **Northwestern**	Ryan Field • Evanston, IL	BTN	**NW** 21–14	30,003	
November 14	12:00 p.m.	No. 2 **Ohio State**	**Illinois**	Memorial Stadium • Champaign, IL (Illibuck)	ABC	**OSU** 28–3	51,515	
November 14	12:00 p.m.	**Maryland**	No. 14 **Michigan State**	Spartan Stadium • East Lansing, MI	ESPN2	**MSU** 24–7	73,406	
November 14	3:30 p.m.	**Nebraska**	**Rutgers**	High Point Solutions Stadium • Piscataway, NJ	BTN	**NEB** 31–14	45,606	
November 14	3:30 p.m.	No. 15 **Michigan**	**Indiana**	Memorial Stadium • Bloomington, IN	ABC/ESPN2	**MICH** 48–41 ^{2OT}	49,557	
November 14	8:00 p.m.	**Minnesota**	No. 8 **Iowa**	Kinnick Stadium • Iowa City, IA (Floyd of Rosedale)	BTN	**IA** 40–35	70,585	
^{#}Rankings from AP Poll released prior to game. All times are in Eastern Time.

Date	Bye Week	
November 14	Penn State	#23 Wisconsin

=== Week 12 ===
Date	Time	Visiting team	Home team	Site	TV	Result	Attendance	Ref.
November 21	12:00 p.m.	No. 14 **Michigan**	**Penn State**	Beaver Stadium • University Park, PA	ABC	**MI** 28–16	107,418	
November 21	12:00 p.m.	**Purdue**	No. 6 **Iowa**	Kinnick Stadium • Iowa City, IA	ESPN2	**IA** 40–20	62,920	
November 21	12:00 p.m.	**Illinois**	**Minnesota**	TCF Bank Stadium • Minneapolis, MN	ESPNNEWS	**MIN** 32–23	47,976	
November 21	12:00 p.m.	**Indiana**	**Maryland**	Byrd Stadium • College Park, MD	BTN	**IND** 47–28	33,685	
November 21	12:00 p.m.	**Rutgers**	Army	Michie Stadium • West Point, NY	CBS Sports Network	**W** 31–21	30,113	
November 21	3:30 p.m.	No. 9 **Michigan State**	No. 2 **Ohio State**	Ohio Stadium • Columbus, OH	ABC	**MSU** 17–14	108,975	
November 21	3:30 p.m.	No. 20 **Northwestern**	No. 21 **Wisconsin**	Camp Randall Stadium • Madison, WI	BTN	**NW** 13–7	75,276	
^{#}Rankings from AP Poll released prior to game. All times are in Eastern Time.

Date	Bye Week
November 21	Nebraska

=== Week 13 ===
Date	Time	Visiting team	Home team	Site	TV	Result	Attendance	Ref.
November 27	3:30 p.m.	No. 3 **Iowa**	**Nebraska**	Memorial Stadium • Lincoln, NE (Heroes Trophy)	ABC	**IA** 28–20	90,830	
November 28	12:00 p.m.	No. 8 **Ohio State**	No. 12 **Michigan**	Michigan Stadium • Ann Arbor, MI (The Game)	ABC	**OSU** 42–13	111,829	
November 28	12:00 p.m.	**Indiana**	**Purdue**	Ross–Ade Stadium • West Lafayette, IN (Old Oaken Bucket)	BTN	**IND** 54–36	37,152	
November 28	12:00 p.m.	**Maryland**	**Rutgers**	High Point Solutions Stadium • Piscataway, NJ	BTN	**MD** 46–41	44,846	
November 28	3:30 p.m.	**Penn State**	No. 6 **Michigan State**	Spartan Stadium • East Lansing, MI (Land Grant Trophy)	ESPN	**MSU** 55–16	74,705	
November 28	3:30 p.m.	**Wisconsin**	**Minnesota**	TCF Bank Stadium • Minneapolis, MN (Paul Bunyan's Axe)	BTN	**WIS** 31–21	52,850	
November 28	3:30 p.m.	No. 17 **Northwestern**	**Illinois**	Soldier Field • Chicago, IL (Land of Lincoln Trophy)	ESPNU	**NW** 24–14	33,514	
^{#}Rankings from AP Poll released prior to game. All times are in Eastern Time.

=== Big Ten Championship Game ===
Date	Time	Visiting team	Home team	Site	TV	Result	Attendance	Ref.
December 5	8:00 p.m.	No. 5 **Michigan State**	No. 4 **Iowa**	Lucas Oil Stadium • Indianapolis, IN	FOX	**MSU** 16–13	66,985	
^{#}Rankings from AP Poll released prior to game. All times are in Eastern Time.

== Bowl games ==
Big Ten bowl games for the 2015 season are:

Bowl game	Date	Site	Television	Time (EST)	Big Ten team	Opponent	Score	Attendance	Ref.
Pinstripe Bowl	December 26	Yankee Stadium • New York, NY	ABC	3:30 p.m.	Indiana	Duke	Duke 44–41 ^{OT}	37,218	
Foster Farms Bowl	December 26	Levi's Stadium • Santa Clara, CA	ESPN	9:15 p.m.	Nebraska	UCLA	NEB 37–29	33,527	
Quick Lane Bowl	December 28	Ford Field • Detroit, MI	ESPN2	5:00 p.m.	Minnesota	Central Michigan	MIN 21–14	34,217	
Holiday Bowl	December 30	Qualcomm Stadium • San Diego, CA	ESPN	10:30 p.m.	#23 Wisconsin	USC	WIS 23–21	48,329	
Outback Bowl	January 1	Raymond James Stadium • Tampa, FL	ESPN2	12:00 p.m.	#12 Northwestern	Tennessee	TENN 45–6	53,202	
Citrus Bowl	January 1	Florida Citrus Bowl • Orlando, FL	ABC	1:00 p.m.	#17 Michigan	#19 Florida	MICH 41–7	63,113	
TaxSlayer Bowl	January 2	EverBank Field • Jacksonville, FL	ESPN	12:00 p.m.	Penn State	Georgia	UGA 24–17	58,212	
New Year's Six Bowls
Fiesta Bowl	January 1	University of Phoenix Stadium • Glendale, AZ	ESPN	1:00 p.m.	#7 Ohio State	#8 Notre Dame	OSU 44–28	71,123	
Rose Bowl	January 1	Rose Bowl • Pasadena, CA	ESPN	5:00 p.m.	#6 Iowa	#5 Stanford	STAN 45–16	94,268	
College Football Playoff
Cotton Bowl (Semifinal)	December 31	AT&T Stadium • Arlington, TX	ESPN	8:00 p.m.	#3 Michigan State	#2 Alabama	ALA 38–0	82,812	

Rankings are from AP Poll. All times Eastern Time Zone.

== Records against FBS conferences ==
2015 records against FBS conferences (through January 2, 2016):

Conference	Record
ACC	3–4
American	2–1
Big 12	2–2
C-USA	5–1
Independents	4–1
MAC	11-2
Mountain West	6–0
Pac-12	5–3
SEC	1–4
Sun Belt	2–0
Total	41-18

== Players of the Week ==
Week	Offensive			Defensive			Special Teams			Freshman		
Week	Player	Position	Team	Player	Position	Team	Player	Position	Team	Player	Position	Team
Week 1	Braxton Miller	HB	OSU	Anthony Walker	LB	NW	William Likely	DB	MD	Clayton Thorson	QB	NW
Week 2	C. J. Beathard	QB	IA	Riley Bullough	LB	MSU	Janarion Grant	WR	RUT	L.J. Scott	RB	MSU
Week 2	Terrell Newby	RB	NEB	Riley Bullough	LB	MSU	Janarion Grant	WR	RUT	Saquon Barkley	RB	PSU
Week 3	Aaron Burbridge	WR	MSU	Anthony Walker	LB	NW	Marshall Koehn	PK	IA	Jonathan Crawford	S	IND
Week 3	Aaron Burbridge	WR	MSU	Anthony Walker	LB	NW	Marshall Koehn	PK	IA	Saquon Barkley	RB	PSU
Week 4	Tommy Armstrong	QB	NEB	Shilique Calhoun	DE	MSU	Cameron Johnston	P	OSU	Taiwan Deal	RB	WIS
Week 4	Jordan Howard	RB	IND	Anthony Zettel	DT	PSU	Cameron Johnston	P	OSU	Taiwan Deal	RB	WIS
Week 5	Ezekiel Elliott	RB	OSU	Desmond King	DB	IA	Sam Foltz	P	NEB	L.J. Scott	RB	MSU
Week 5	Ezekiel Elliott	RB	OSU	Joe Schobert	LB	WIS	Sam Foltz	P	NEB	L.J. Scott	RB	MSU
Week 6	Jordan Canzeri	RB	IA	Jourdan Lewis	CB	MI	Jehu Chesson	WR	MI	Jabrill Peppers	S	MI
Week 6	Jordan Canzeri	RB	IA	Jourdan Lewis	CB	MI	Jehu Chesson	WR	MI	Shannon Brooks	RB	MIN
Week 7	Akrum Wadley	RB	IA	Shilique Calhoun	DE	MSU	Jalen Watts-Jackson	DB	MSU	T. J. Edwards	LB	WIS
Week 8	Connor Cook	QB	MSU	Dean Lowry	DE	NW	Drew Meyer	P	WIS	Clayton Thorson	QB	NW
Week 8	J. T. Barrett	QB	OSU	Dean Lowry	DE	NW	Drew Meyer	P	WIS	Clayton Thorson	QB	NW
Week 9	David Blough	QB	PUR	Anthony Brown	CB	PUR	William Likely	DB	MD	Jabrill Peppers	S	MICH
Week 10	Tommy Armstrong Jr.	QB	NEB	Vonn Bell	S	OSU	Janarion Grant	WR	RUT	Ke'Shawn Vaughn	RB	ILL
Week 11	Jehu Chesson	WR	MICH	Malik McDowell	DL	MSU	Griffin Oakes	PK	IND	Shannon Brooks	RB	MINN
Week 11	Jake Rudock	QB	MICH	Malik McDowell	DL	MSU	Griffin Oakes	PK	IND	Shannon Brooks	RB	MINN
Week 12	Nate Sudfeld	QB	IND	Jon Reschke	LB	MSU	Griffin Oakes	PK	IND	Shannon Brooks	RB	MIN
Week 12	Nate Sudfeld	QB	IND	Deonte Gibson	DE	NW	Michael Geiger	PK	MSU	Shannon Brooks	RB	MIN
Week 13	Nate Sudfeld	QB	IND	Anthony Walker	LB	NW	Drew Meyer	P	WIS	Parker Hesse	DE	IA
Week 13	Ezekiel Elliott	RB	OSU	Anthony Walker	LB	NW	Drew Meyer	P	WIS	Parker Hesse	DE	IA

== Players of the Year ==
2015 Big Ten Player of the Year Awards

Award	Player	School
Graham-George Offensive Player of the Year	Ezekiel Elliott	Ohio State
Nagurski-Woodson Defensive Player of the Year	Carl Nassib	Penn State
Thompson-Randle El Freshman of the Year	Jabrill Peppers	Michigan
Griese-Brees Quarterback of the Year	Connor Cook	Michigan State
Richter-Howard Receiver of the Year	Aaron Burbridge	Michigan State
Ameche-Dayne Running Back of the Year	Ezekiel Elliott	Ohio State
Kwalick-Clark Tight End of the Year	Jake Butt	Michigan
Rimington-Pace Offensive Lineman of the Year	Taylor Decker	Ohio State
Smith-Brown Defensive Lineman of the Year	Joey Bosa	Ohio State
Butkus-Fitzgerald Linebacker of the Year	Joe Schobert	Wisconsin
Tatum-Woodson Defensive Back of the Year	Desmond King	Iowa
Bakken-Andersen Kicker of the Year	Griffin Oakes	Indiana
Eddleman-Fields Punter of the Year	Sam Foltz	Nebraska
Rodgers-Dwight Return Specialist of the Year	William Likely	Maryland
Hayes-Schembechler Coach of the Year (coaches vote)	Kirk Ferentz	Iowa
Dave McClain Coach of the Year (media vote)	Kirk Ferentz	Iowa

== All-conference players ==
2015 Big Ten All-Conference Honors

Unanimous selections in ALL CAPS

Position	Player	Team
First Team Offense (Coaches)
QB	Connor Cook	Michigan State
RB	Jordan Howard	Indiana
RB	EZEKIEL ELLIOTT	Ohio State
WR	Jehu Chesson	Michigan
WR	Aaron Burbridge	Michigan State
TE	Jake Butt	Michigan
C	Jack Allen	Michigan State
OG	Jordan Walsh	Iowa
OG	Pat Elflein	Ohio State
OT	Jack Conklin	Michigan State
OT	TAYLOR DECKER	Ohio State
First Team Defense (Coaches)
DL	Joe Bosa	Ohio State
DL	Shilique Calhoun	Michigan State
DL	Carl Nassib	Penn State
DL	Yannick Ngakoue	Maryland
LB	Anthony Walker Jr.	Northwestern
LB	Joshua Perry	Ohio State
LB	Joe Schobert	Wisconsin
DB	Desmond King	Iowa
DB	William Likely	Maryland
DB	Jourdan Lewis	Michigan
DB	Jabrill Peppers	Michigan
First Team Special Teams (Coaches)
K	Griffin Oakes	Indiana
P	Sam Foltz	Nebraska
RS	William Likely	Maryland

Position	Player	Team
Second Team Offense (Coaches)
QB	C.J. Beathard	Iowa
RB	Justin Jackson	Northwestern
RB	Saquon Barkley	Penn State
WR	Jordan Westerkamp	Nebraska
WR	Alex Erickson	Wisconsin
TE	Dan Vitale	Northwestern
C	Austin Blythe	Iowa
OG	Dan Feeney	Indiana
OG	Brian Allen	Michigan State
OT	Alex Lewis	Nebraska
OT	Jason Spriggs	Indiana
Second Team Defense (Coaches)
DL	Malik McDowell	Michigan State
DL	Maliek Collins	Nebraska
DL	Dean Lowry	Northwestern
DL	Adolphus Washington	Ohio State
LB	Josey Jewell	Iowa
LB	Darron Lee	Ohio State
LB	Raekwon McMillan	Ohio State
DB	Nick VanHoose	Northwestern
DB	Eli Apple	Ohio State
DB	Vonn Bell	Ohio State
DB	Michael Caputo	Wisconsin
Second Team Special Teams (Coaches)
K	Marshall Koehn	Iowa
P	Cameron Johnston	Ohio State
RS	Jabrill Peppers	Michigan

Position	Player	Team
Third Team Offense (Coaches)
QB	Nate Sudfeld	Indiana
RB	Josh Ferguson	Illinois
RB	Jordan Canzeri	Iowa
WR	Michael Thomas	Ohio State
WR	Chris Godwin	Penn State
TE	Josiah Price	Michigan State
C	Jacoby Boren	Ohio State
OG	Donavon Clark	Michigan State
OG	Billy Price	Ohio State
OT	Erik Magnuson	Michigan
OT	Tyler Marz	Wisconsin
Third Team Defense (Coaches)
DL	Nate Meier	Iowa
DL	Chris Wormley	Michigan
DL	Austin Johnson	Penn State
DL	Anthony Zettel	Penn State
LB	Riley Bullough	Michigan State
LB	Darien Harris	Michigan State
LB	Vince Biegel	Wisconsin
DB	Jordan Lomax	Iowa
DB	Demetrious Cox	Michigan State
DB	Eric Murray	Minnesota
DB	Matthew Harris	Northwestern
Third Team Special Teams (Coaches)
K	Ryan Santoso	Minnesota
P	Peter Mortell	Minnesota
RS	Janarion Grant	Rutgers

Coaches Honorable Mention: ILLINOIS: Geronimo Allison, Taylor Barton, V'Angelo Bentley (return specialist), Clayton Fejedelem, Ted Karras, Mason Monheim, T.J. Neal, Austin Schmidt, Dawuane Smoot, Jihad Ward; INDIANA: Simmie Cobbs, Michael Cooper, Darius Latham, Nick Mangieri, Zack Shaw; IOWA: Cole Fisher, Jaleel Johnson, Dillon Kidd, Desmond King (return specialist), Ben Niemann, Matt VandeBerg, Sean Welsh; MARYLAND: Jermaine Carter, Michael Dunn, Quinton Jefferson; MICHIGAN: Kenny Allen, Joe Bolden, Ben Braden, Mason Cole, Amara Darboh, Graham Glasgow, Ryan Glasgow, Willie Henry, Kyle Kalis, Desmond Morgan, Blake O'Neil, Jake Rudock, De'Veon Smith, Jarrod Wilson; MICHIGAN STATE: Jon Reschke, R.J. Shelton, Lawrence Thomas; MINNESOTA: Briean Boddy-Calhoun, Shannon Brooks, De'Vondre Campbell, Theiren Cockran, Brandon Lingen, KJ Maye, Jalen Myrick, Jonah Pirsig, Steven Richardson; NEBRASKA: Drew Brown, Nate Gerry, Andy Janovich, Joshua Kalu; NORTHWESTERN: Deonte Gibson, Solomon Vault (return specialist); OHIO STATE: Tyquan Lewis, Jalin Marshall (return specialist), Braxton Miller, Tyvis Powell, Nick Vannett; PENN STATE: Marcus Allen, Jason Cabinda, Trevor Williams; PURDUE: Anthony Brown, Markell Jones, Robert Kugler, Jake Replogle, Frankie Williams; RUTGERS: Leonte Caroo, Steve Longa, Keith Lumpkin; WISCONSIN: T.J. Edwards, Troy Fumagalli, Darius Hillary, Tanner McEvoy.

Position	Player	Team
First Team Offense (Media)
QB	Connor Cook	Michigan State
RB	Jordan Howard	Indiana
RB	EZEKIEL ELLIOTT	Ohio State
WR	Alex Erickson	Wisconsin
WR	Aaron Burbridge	Michigan State
TE	Jake Butt	Michigan
C	Jack Allen	Michigan State
OG	Dan Feeney	Indiana
OG	Pat Elflein	Ohio State
OT	Jack Conklin	Michigan State
OT	Taylor Decker	Ohio State
First Team Defense (Media)
DL	Joey Bosa	Ohio State
DL	Yannick Ngakoue	Maryland
DL	Shilique Calhoun	Michigan State
DL	Carl Nassib	Penn State
LB	Anthony Walker Jr.	Northwestern
LB	Raekwon McMillan	Ohio State
LB	Joe Schobert	Wisconsin
DB	DESMOND KING	Iowa
DB	Jourdan Lewis	Michigan
DB	Jabrill Peppers	Michigan
DB	Vonn Bell	Ohio State
First Team Special Teams (Media)
K	Griffin Oakes	Indiana
P	Sam Foltz	Nebraska
RS	William Likely	Maryland

Position	Player	Team
Second Team Offense (Media)
QB	C.J. Beathard	Iowa
RB	Justin Jackson	Northwestern
RB	Saquon Barkley	Penn State
WR	Jordan Westerkamp	Nebraska
WR	Chris Godwin	Penn State
TE	Dan Vitale	Northwestern
C	Austin Blythe	Iowa
OG	Jordan Walsh	Iowa
OG	Brian Allen	Michigan State
OT	Jason Spriggs	Indiana
OT	Tyler Marz	Wisconsin
Second Team Defense (Media)
DL	Malik McDowell	Michigan State
DL	Dean Lowry	Northwestern
DL	Adolphus Washington	Ohio State
DL	Austin Johnson	Penn State
LB	Josey Jewell	Iowa
LB	Riley Bullough	Michigan State
LB	Joshua Perry	Ohio State
DB	William Likely	Maryland
DB	Clayton Fejedelem	Illinois
DB	Nick VanHoose	Northwestern
DB	Michael Caputo	Wisconsin
Second Team Special Teams (Media)
K	Drew Brown	Nebraska
P	Cameron Johnston	Ohio State
RS	Janarion Grant	Rutgers

Position	Player	Team
Third Team Offense (Media)
QB	Nate Sudfeld	Indiana
RB	Josh Ferguson	Illinois
RB	Jordan Canzeri	Iowa
WR	Michael Thomas	Ohio State
WR	Leonte Carroo	Rutgers
TE	Josiah Price	Michigan State
C	Jacoby Boren	Ohio State
OG	Ted Karras	Illinois
OG	Kyle Kalis	Michigan
OT	Erik Magnuson	Michigan
OT	Alex Lewis	Nebraska
Third Team Defense (Media)
DL	Nate Meier	Iowa
DL	Maliek Collins	Nebraska
DL	Deonte Gibson	Northwestern
DL	Anthony Zettel	Penn State
LB	Darron Lee	Ohio State
LB	Steve Longa	Rutgers
LB	Vince Biegel	Wisconsin
DB	Eric Murray	Minnesota
DB	Nate Gerry	Nebraska
DB	Matthew Harris	Northwestern
DB	Briean Boddy-Calhoun	Minnesota
Third Team Special Teams (Media)
K	Kenny Allen	Michigan
P	Peter Mortell	Minnesota
RS	Solomon Vault	Northwestern

Media Honorable Mention: ILLINOIS: Geronimo Allison, Taylor Barton, V'Angelo Bentley (return specialist), Mason Monheim, T.J. Neal, Austin Schmidt, Dawuane Smoot, Jihad Ward; INDIANA: Simmie Cobbs, Michael Cooper, Nick Mangieri, Marcus Oliver, Mitchell Paige (return specialist); IOWA: Cole Fisher, Jaleel Johnson, Dillon Kidd, Jordan Lomax, Desmond King (return specialist), Marshall Koehn, Matt VandeBerg, Sean Welsh; MARYLAND: Jermaine Carter, Sean Davis, Brandon Ross; MICHIGAN: Joe Bolden, Ben Braden, Jehu Chesson, Mason Cole, Amara Darboh, Graham Glasgow, Ryan Glasgow, Willie Henry, Royce Jenkins-Stone, Jourdan Lewis (return specialist), Desmond Morgan, Blake O'Neil, Jabrill Peppers (return specialist), Jake Rudock, Chris Wormley; MICHIGAN STATE: Donavan Clark, Demetrious Cox, Darien Harris, Joel Heath, Jon Reschke; MINNESOTA: Shannon Brooks, De'Vondre Campbell, Theiren Cockran, Brandon Lingen, Jack Lynn, KJ Maye, Jonah Pirsig, Cody Poock, Steven Richardson, Ryan Santoso; NEBRASKA: Cethan Carter; OHIO STATE: Eli Apple, Gareon Conley, Tyquan Lewis, Jalin Marshall (wide receiver/return specialist), Braxton Miller, Billy Price, Tyvis Powell, Nick Vannett; PENN STATE: Marcus Allen, Jason Cabinda, Grant Haley, DaeSean Hamilton; PURDUE: Anthony Brown, Markell Jones, Robert Kugler, Jake Replogle, Frankie Williams; RUTGERS: Quentin Gause, Keith Lumpkin, Chris Muller; WISCONSIN: Michael Dieter, Tanner McEvoy, Troy Fumagalli, Chikwe Obasih, Sojourn Shelton.

== All-Americans ==
The 2015 College Football All-America Team is composed of the following College Football All-American first teams chosen by the following selector organizations: Associated Press (AP), Football Writers Association of America (FWAA), American Football Coaches Association (AFCA), Walter Camp Foundation (WCFF), The Sporting News (TSN), Sports Illustrated (SI), USA Today (USAT) ESPN, CBS Sports (CBS), College Football News (CFN), Scout.com, and Yahoo! Sports (Yahoo!).

Currently, the NCAA compiles consensus all-America teams in the sports of Division I-FBS football and Division I men's basketball using a point system computed from All-America teams named by coaches associations or media sources. The system consists of three points for a first-team honor, two points for second-team honor, and one point for third-team honor. Honorable mention and fourth team or lower recognitions are not accorded any points. Football consensus teams are compiled by position and the player accumulating the most points at each position is named first team consensus all-American. Currently, the NCAA recognizes All-Americans selected by the AP, AFCA, FWAA, TSN, and the WCFF to determine Consensus and Unanimous All-Americans. Any player named to the First Team by all five of the NCAA-recognized selectors is deemed a Unanimous All-American.

Position	Player	School	Selector	Unanimous	Consensus
First Team All-Americans
TE	Jake Butt	Michigan	CBS, SI		
OL	Jack Allen	Michigan State	AP, CBS, SI, FOX		
OL	Jack Conklin	Michigan State	TSN, USA Today, CBS, Athlon		
OL	Taylor Decker	Ohio State	AFCA, AP, WCFF, CBS, SI, FOX		*
OL	Dan Feeney	Indiana	ESPN		
OL	Jason Spriggs	Indiana	FWAA, Phil Steele		
OL	Jordan Walsh	Iowa	FOX		
DL	Joey Bosa	Ohio State	AFCA, WCFF, USA Today, CBS, SI, ESPN, Athlon, Phil Steele		*
DL	Malik McDowell	Michigan State	FOX		
DL	Carl Nassib	Penn State	AFCA, AP, FWAA, TSN, WCFF, CBS, SI, ESPN, FOX, Athlon, Phil Steele	*	*
DL	Adolphus Washington	Ohio State	TSN		
LB	Joe Schobert	Wisconsin	FWAA, ESPN, Phil Steele		
CB	Desmond King	Iowa	AP, AFCA, FWAA, TSN, WCFF, USA Today, CBS, SI, ESPN, FOX, Athlon, Phil Steele	*	*
CB	Jourdan Lewis	Michigan	USA Today, SI		
S	Vonn Bell	Ohio State	AP, TSN, SI, Athlon		
PR	William Likely	Maryland	FWAA, Phil Steele		

Position	Player	School	Selector
Second Team All-Americans
RB	Ezekiel Elliott	Ohio State	USA Today, SI, AP, FWAA, Athlon, Phil Steele
TE	Jake Butt	Michigan	AP, FOX, TSN, Athlon
OL	Jack Allen	Michigan State	USA Today, WCFF, FWAA, Athlon, Phil Steele
OL	Jack Conklin	Michigan State	AP, WCFF, FWAA
OL	Taylor Decker	Ohio State	USA Today, FWAA, TSN, Athlon, Phil Steele
OL	Pat Elflein	Ohio State	SI, AP
OL	Dan Feeney	Indiana	CBS, Athlon
OL	Jason Spriggs	Indiana	WCFF, TSN
DL	Joey Bosa	Ohio State	AP, FOX, TSN
DL	Shilique Calhoun	Michigan State	CBS, WCFF, FWAA
DL	Carl Nassib	Penn State	USA Today
DL	Adolphus Washington	Ohio State	CBS
LB	Darron Lee	Ohio State	SI
LB	Raekwon McMillan	Ohio State	WCFF
LB	Joe Schobert	Wisconsin	USA Today, CBS, WCFF, AP, TSN, Athlon
LB	Anthony Walker	Northwestern	SI, FOX
CB	Jourdan Lewis	Michigan	WCFF, AP, FWAA, FOX, Athlon, Phil Steele
S	Vonn Bell	Ohio State	FOX
S	Jabrill Peppers	Michigan	CBS, SI, TSN
RET	William Likely	Maryland	USA Today, SI, Athlon
AP	Jabrill Peppers	Michigan	FOX

Position	Player	School	Selector
Third Team All-Americans
OL	Austin Blythe	Iowa	AP, Athlon
OL	Jack Conklin	Michigan State	Phil Steele
OL	Pat Elflein	Ohio State	Athlon
OL	Dan Feeney	Indiana	AP
OL	Jason Spriggs	Indiana	AP
OL	Jordan Walsh	Iowa	Athlon
DL	Joey Bosa	Ohio State	Phil Steele
DL	Shilique Calhoun	Michigan State	AP, Phil Steele
LB	Anthony Walker	Northwestern	AP, Athlon
LB	Raekwon McMillan	Ohio State	Phil Steele

Position	Player	School	Selector
Fourth Team All-Americans
OL	Austin Blythe	Iowa	Phil Steele
DL	Yannick Ngakoue	Maryland	Phil Steele
K	Griffin Oakes	Indiana	Phil Steele
AP	Jabrill Peppers	Michigan	Phil Steele

Position	Player	School	Selector
Honorable Mention All-Americans
QB	Connor Cook	Michigan State	SI
WR	Aaron Burbridge	Michigan State	SI
TE	George Kittle	Iowa	SI
WR	Aaron Burbridge	Michigan State	SI
OL	Austin Blythe	Iowa	SI
OL	Jack Conklin	Michigan State	SI
OL	Dan Feeney	Indiana	SI
OL	Jason Spriggs	Indiana	SI
OL	Jordan Walsh	Iowa	SI
DT	Shilique Calhoun	Michigan State	SI
DT	Adolphus Washington	Ohio State	SI
DT	Anthony Zettel	Penn State	SI
LB	Raekwon McMillan	Ohio State	SI
LB	Joshua Perry	Ohio State	SI
LB	Joe Schobert	Wisconsin	SI
CB	Nick VanHoose	Northwestern	SI
P	Cameron Johnston	Ohio State	SI
AP	Jabrill Peppers	Michigan	SI

*AFCA All-America Team
*USA Today All-America Team
*CBS Sports All-America Team
*Sports Illustrated All-America Team
*Walter Camp Football Foundation All-America Team
*Associated Press All-America Team
*ESPN.com All-America Team
*Football Writers Association of America All-America Team
*Fox Sports All-America Team
*Sporting News All-America Team
*Athlon Sports All-America Team
*Phil Steele All-America Team

== Academic All-Americans ==
2015 CoSIDA Academic-All Americans

Player	School	Team
CoSIDA Academic All-Americans
Jacoby Boren	Ohio State	First Team
Jack Willoughby	Ohio State	First Team
Jordan Lomax	Iowa	Second Team
Brandon Lingen	Minnesota	Second Team
Tyler Yazujian	Penn State	Second Team
Robert Kugler	Purdue	Second Team

== National award winners ==
Jim Thorpe Award
Desmond King, Iowa

Lombardi Award
Carl Nassib, Penn State

Lott IMPACT Trophy
Carl Nassib, Penn State

Eddie Robinson Coach of the Year
Kirk Ferentz, Iowa

NCAA List of National Award Winners

== Attendance ==
Team	Stadium	Capacity	Game 1	Game 2	Game 3	Game 4	Game 5	Game 6	Game 7	Total	Average	% of Capacity
Illinois	Memorial Stadium	60,670	36,693	37,733	44,366	40,138	45,438	51,515	–	255,883	42,647	70.3%
Indiana	Memorial Stadium	52,929	36,071	41,509	44,823	52,929	40,567	44,739	49,557	310,195	44,314	83.7%
Iowa	Kinnick Stadium	70,585	59,450	63,636	56,401	66,693	62,667	70,585	62,920	442,352	63,193	89.5%
Maryland	Byrd Stadium	51,802	38,117	36,332	36,827	51,802	44,678	33,685	–	241,441	40,240	77.7%
Michigan	Michigan Stadium	107,601	109,651	108,683	108,940	110,452	111,740	109,879	111,829	771,174	110,168	102.4%
Michigan State	Spartan Stadium	75,005	76,526	74,211	75,218	74,418	74,144	73,406	74,705	522,628	74,661	99.5%
Minnesota	TCF Bank Stadium	52,525	54,147	52,823	53,917	52,062	50,709	47,976	52,850	364,484	52,069	99.1%
Nebraska	Memorial Stadium	87,091	89,959	89,822	89,899	89,886	89,493	90,094	90,830	629,983	89,998	103.3%
Northwestern	Ryan Field	47,130	36,024	29,131	30,107	30,044	44,135	34,116	30,003	233,560	33,366	70.8%
Ohio State	Ohio Stadium	104,944	107,145	104,095	106,123	107,869	108,423	108,075	108,975	750,705	107,244	102.2%
Penn State	Beaver Stadium	106,572	93,065	103,323	95,107	107,387	97,873	94,417	107,418	698,590	99,799	93.6%
Purdue	Ross–Ade Stadium	57,236	41,158	45,759	33,160	33,780	31,351	40,197	37,152	262,557	37,508	65.5%
Rutgers	High Point Solutions Stadium	52,454	47,453	46,536	46,136	50,373	53,111	45,606	44,846	334,061	47,723	91.0%
Wisconsin	Camp Randall Stadium	80,321	76,535	77,157	80,829	80,933	80,794	74,575	75,276	546,099	78,014	97.1%
Total	–	–	–	–	–	–	–	–	–	6,363,712	65,782	–

== 2016 NFL draft ==
47 Big Ten athletes were selected in the 2016 NFL Draft.

Team	Round 1	Round 2	Round 3	Round 4	Round 5	Round 6	Round 7	Total
Illinois		1				1	1	3
Indiana		1			1	1		3
Iowa							1	1
Maryland		1	1		1			3
Michigan			1	1		1		3
Michigan State	1		1	1		1	1	5
Minnesota				2				2
Nebraska			2	1		1		4
Northwestern				1		1		2
Ohio State	5	2	3	2				12
Penn State		2	1			2		5
Purdue						1		1
Rutgers			1					1
Wisconsin				1		1		2

*	= Compensatory Selections

Rnd.	Pick	Team	Player	Pos.	College	Notes
1	3	San Diego Chargers	Joey Bosa	DE	Ohio State	
1	4	Dallas Cowboys	Ezekiel Elliott	RB	Ohio State	
1	8	Tennessee Titans	Jack Conklin	T	Michigan State	from Miami via Philadelphia and Cleveland (Note: No. 8: multiple trades: No. 8: Miami → Philadelphia (PD). Miami traded its first-round selection (8th) to Philadelphia in exchange for linebacker Kiko Alonso, cornerback Byron Maxwell, and Philadelphia's first-round selection (13th). No. 8: Philadelphia → Cleveland (PD). see No. 2: Cleveland → Philadelphia. No. 8: Cleveland → Tennessee (D). Cleveland traded its first- and sixth-round selections (8th and 176th) to Tennessee in exchange for Tennessee's first- and third-round selections (15th and 76th) as well as its 2017 second-round selection.)
1	10	New York Giants	Eli Apple	CB	Ohio State	
1	16	Detroit Lions	Taylor Decker	T	Ohio State	
1	20	New York Jets	Darron Lee	LB	Ohio State	
2	43	Tennessee Titans	Austin Johnson	DT	Penn State	from Philadelphia via Los Angeles (Note: No. 43: multiple trades: No. 43: Philadelphia → Los Angeles (PD). Philadelphia traded its second-round selection in this year's draft, a 2015 fourth-round selection and quarterback Nick Foles to Los Angeles in exchange for Los Angeles's 2015 fifth-round selection and quarterback Sam Bradford. The trade also included a possible conditional fourth-round selection in this year's draft that Philadelphia would have received if Bradford took less than 50 percent of the snaps in 2015. Bradford took the majority of snaps for Philadelphia in 2015, so the fourth-round pick was returned to Los Angeles. No. 43: Los Angeles → Tennessee (PD). see No. 1: Tennessee → Los Angeles.)
2	44	Oakland Raiders	Jihad Ward	DT	Illinois	
2	47	New Orleans Saints	Michael Thomas	WR	Ohio State	
2	48	Green Bay Packers	Jason Spriggs	T	Indiana	from Indianapolis (Note: No. 48: Indianapolis → Green Bay (D). Indianapolis traded its second-round selection (48th) to Green Bay in exchange for Green Bay's second-, fourth- and seventh-round selections (57th, 125th, and 248th).)
2	51	New York Jets	Christian Hackenberg	QB	Penn State	
2	58	Pittsburgh Steelers	Sean Davis	CB	Maryland	
2	61	New Orleans Saints	Vonn Bell	S	Ohio State	from Arizona via New England (Note: No. 61: multiple trades: No. 61: Arizona → New England (PD). Arizona traded its second-round selection and guard Jonathan Cooper to New England in exchange for defensive end Chandler Jones. No. 61: New England → New Orleans (D). New England traded its second-round selection to New Orleans in exchange for New Orleans' third- and fourth-round selections (78th and 112nd).)
3	65	Cleveland Browns	Carl Nassib	DE	Penn State	
3	67	Dallas Cowboys	Maliek Collins	DT	Nebraska	
3	69	Jacksonville Jaguars	Yannick Ngakoue	LB	Maryland	
3	75	Oakland Raiders	Shilique Calhoun	DE	Michigan State	
3	80	Buffalo Bills	Adolphus Washington	DT	Ohio State	
3	85	Houston Texans	Braxton Miller	WR	Ohio State	
3	86	Miami Dolphins	Leonte Carroo	WR	Rutgers	from Minnesota (Note: No. 86: Minnesota → Miami (D). Minnesota traded this selection to Miami in exchange for Miami's sixth-round selection (186th) and Miami's third- and fourth-round selections in 2017.)
3	94	Seattle Seahawks	Nick Vannett	TE	Ohio State	from Denver (Note: No. 94: Denver → Seattle (PD). see No. 26: Seattle → Denver.)
3*	95	Detroit Lions	Graham Glasgow	G	Michigan	
3*	96	New England Patriots	Vincent Valentine	DT	Nebraska	
4	99	Cleveland Browns	Joe Schobert	LB	Wisconsin	
4	100	Oakland Raiders	Connor Cook	QB	Michigan State	from Tennessee via Philadelphia (Note: No. 100: multiple trades: No. 100: Tennessee → Philadelphia (PD). Tennessee traded its fourth-round selection to Philadelphia in exchange for running back DeMarco Murray and Philadelphia's fourth-round selection (113th). No. 100: Philadelphia → Cleveland (PD). see No. 2: Cleveland → Philadelphia.)
4	102	San Diego Chargers	Joshua Perry	LB	Ohio State	
4	106	Kansas City Chiefs	Eric Murray	CB	Minnesota	from Chicago via Tampa Bay (Note: No. 106: multiple trades: No. 106: Chicago → Tampa Bay (D). see No. 9: Tampa Bay → Chicago. No. 106: Tampa Bay → Kansas City (D). see No. 59: Kansas City → Tampa Bay.)
4	115	Atlanta Falcons	De'Vondre Campbell	LB	Minnesota	
4	130	Baltimore Ravens	Alex Lewis	T	Nebraska	from Denver (Note: No. 130: Denver → Baltimore (PD). Denver traded this selection to Baltimore in exchange for Baltimore's fifth-round selection (144th) and center Gino Gradkowski.)
4*	132	Baltimore Ravens	Willie Henry	DT	Michigan	
4*	137	Green Bay Packers	Dean Lowry	DE	Northwestern	
4*	139	Buffalo Bills	Cardale Jones	QB	Ohio State	Extra compensatory pick authorized by NFLMC and NFLPA
5	147	Seattle Seahawks	Quinton Jefferson	DT	Maryland	
5	150	Chicago Bears	Jordan Howard	RB	Indiana	
6	176		Andy Janovich	FB	Nebraska	from Cleveland (Note: No. 176: Cleveland → Tennessee (D). see No. 8: Cleveland → Tennessee.)
6	187	Washington Redskins	Nate Sudfeld	QB	Indiana	from New Orleans (Note: No. 187: New Orleans → Washington (PD). New Orleans traded this selection along with its sixth-round selection in the 2015 NFL draft (187th) to Washington in exchange for Washington's fifth-round selection.)
6	189	Dallas Cowboys	Anthony Brown	CB	Purdue	from Oakland (Note: No. 189: Oakland → Dallas (PD). see No. 143: Dallas → Oakland.)
6	191	Detroit Lions	Jake Rudock	QB	Michigan	
6	197	Tampa Bay Buccaneers	Dan Vitale	FB	Northwestern	from Washington (Note: No. 197: Washington → Tampa Bay (PD). Washington traded this selection to Tampa Bay in exchange for Tampa Bay's seventh-round selection (232nd) and safety Dashon Goldson.)
6	198	San Diego Chargers	Derek Watt	FB	Wisconsin	from Minnesota (Note: No. 198: Minnesota → San Diego (PD). Minnesota traded this selection to San Diego in exchange for offensive lineman Jeremiah Sirles.)
6	202	Detroit Lions	Anthony Zettel	DE	Penn State	from Seattle (Note: No. 202: Seattle → Detroit (PD). Seattle traded this selection to Detroit in exchange for cornerback Mohammed Seisay.)
6	204	Miami Dolphins	Jordan Lucas	S	Penn State	from New England via Chicago (Note: No. 204: multiple trades: No. 204: New England → Chicago (PD). New England traded this selection to Chicago in exchange for linebacker Jon Bostic. No. 204: Chicago → New England (PD). see No. 127: New England → Chicago)
6*	213	San Francisco 49ers	Aaron Burbridge	WR	Michigan State	
6*	221	New England Patriots	Ted Karras III	G	Illinois	
7	224	San Diego Chargers	Donavon Clark	G	Michigan State	
7	245	Cincinnati Bengals	Clayton Fejedelem	S	Illinois	
7	248	Indianapolis Colts	Austin Blythe	C	Iowa	

In the explanations below, (PD) indicates trades completed prior to the start of the draft (i.e. Pre-Draft), while (D) denotes trades that took place during the 2016 draft.

Round one

Round two

Round three

Round four

Round five

Round six

Round seven

== Head coaches ==
- Bill Cubit, Illinois (interim)
- Kevin R. Wilson, Indiana
- Kirk Ferentz, Iowa
- Randy Edsall / Mike Locksley (interim)*, Maryland
- Jim Harbaugh, Michigan
- Mark Dantonio, Michigan State
- Jerry Kill / Tracy Claeys*, Minnesota
- Mike Riley, Nebraska
- Pat Fitzgerald, Northwestern
- Urban Meyer, Ohio State
- James Franklin, Penn State
- Darrell Hazell, Purdue
- Kyle Flood, Rutgers
- Paul Chryst, Wisconsin

*Maryland fired Randy Edsall six games into the season. Offensive coordinator Mike Locksley was named interim coach for the remainder of the season

*Jerry Kill stepped down as Minnesota's coach on October 28, 2015 due to health reasons. Defensive coordinator Tracy Claeys was named interim coach for a couple of weeks and then named the permanent replacement on November 11.
