= 2015 Illinois Fighting Illini football team =

American college football season

2015 Illinois Fighting Illini football
- Conference: Big Ten Conference
- West Division
- Record: 5–7 (2–6 Big Ten)
- Head coach: Bill Cubit (interim; 1st season)
- Offensive scheme: Spread
- Co-defensive coordinators: Tim Banks (4th season); Mike Phair (1st season)
- Base defense: 4–3
- Home stadium: Memorial Stadium

2015 Big Ten Conference football standings
	Conf.			Overall
Team	W		L	W		L
East Division
No. 6 Michigan State xy$^	7	–	1	12	–	2
No. 4 Ohio State x	7	–	1	12	–	1
No. 12 Michigan	6	–	2	10	–	3
Penn State	4	–	4	7	–	6
Indiana	2	–	6	6	–	7
Rutgers	1	–	7	4	–	8
Maryland	1	–	7	3	–	9
West Division
No. 9 Iowa xy	8	–	0	12	–	2
No. 23 Northwestern	6	–	2	10	–	3
No. 21 Wisconsin	6	–	2	10	–	3
Nebraska	3	–	5	6	–	7
Minnesota	2	–	6	6	–	7
Illinois	2	–	6	5	–	7
Purdue	1	–	7	2	–	10
Championship: Michigan State 16, Iowa 13
^ – College Football Playoff participant; $ – Conference champion; x – Division champion/co-champions; y – Championship game participant; Rankings from AP Poll

The 2015 Illinois Fighting Illini football team represented the University of Illinois at Urbana–Champaign in the 2015 NCAA Division I FBS football season. They were led by interim head coach Bill Cubit, and played their home games at Memorial Stadium. They were members of the West Division of the Big Ten Conference. They finished the season 5–7, 2–6 in Big Ten play to finish in a tie for fifth place in the West Division.

On November 28, interim head coach Bill Cubit was signed to a two-year contract and named head coach. However, on March 5, Cubit was fired by new athletic director Josh Whitman.

== Head coach ==
On August 28, 2015—one week before the start of the regular season—head coach Tim Beckman was fired after an internal investigation found that he had made efforts "to deter injury reporting and influence medical decisions that pressured players to avoid or postpone medical treatment and continue playing despite injuries." He was replaced by offensive coordinator Bill Cubit on an interim basis for the season.

A few hours before the final game of the season, Cubit had the "Interim" removed from his title and was named permanent head coach. It was an appointment that would last only one game, as Cubit was removed during the following off-season by new Illinois Athletic Director Josh Whitman, on the day Whitman officially assumed the role, in favor of former Chicago Bears and Tampa Bay Buccaneers head coach Lovie Smith.

== Schedule ==
Illinois announced their 2015 football schedule on June 3, 2013. The 2015 schedule consist of 7 home and 5 away games in the regular season. The Fighting Illini will host Big Ten foes Nebraska, Northwestern, Ohio State, and Wisconsin and will travel to Iowa, Minnesota, Penn State, and Purdue.

The Fighting Illini hosted three of their four non conference games against Kent State, Middle Tennessee and Western Illinois. Illinois traveled to Chapel Hill, North Carolina and faced the North Carolina of the Atlantic Coast Conference on September 19.

Date	Time	Opponent	Site	TV	Result	Attendance
September 5	2:00 pm	Kent State*	Memorial Stadium; Champaign, IL	BTN	W 52–3	36,693
September 12	11:00 am	Western Illinois*	Memorial Stadium; Champaign, IL	BTN	W 44–0	37,733
September 19	11:00 am	at North Carolina*	Kenan Memorial Stadium; Chapel Hill, NC	ESPN2	L 14–48	41,000
September 26	3:00 pm	Middle Tennessee*	Memorial Stadium; Champaign, IL	ESPNews	W 27–25	44,366
October 3	3:00 pm	Nebraska	Memorial Stadium; Champaign, IL	BTN	W 14–13	40,138
October 10	11:00 am	at No. 22 Iowa	Kinnick Stadium; Iowa City, IA	ESPN2	L 20–29	66,693
October 24	2:30 pm	Wisconsin^{†}	Memorial Stadium; Champaign, IL	BTN	L 13–24	45,438
October 31	11:00 am	at Penn State	Beaver Stadium; University Park, PA	ESPN2	L 0–39	94,417
November 7	11:00 am	at Purdue	Ross–Ade Stadium; West Lafayette, IN (Battle for the Purdue Cannon)	BTN	W 48–14	40,197
November 14	11:00 am	No. 3 Ohio State	Memorial Stadium; Champaign, IL (Battle for the Illibuck)	ABC	L 3–28	51,515
November 21	11:00 am	at Minnesota	TCF Bank Stadium; Minneapolis, MN	ESPNews	L 23–32	47,976
November 28	2:30 pm	No. 17 Northwestern	Soldier Field; Chicago, IL (Battle for the Land of Lincoln Trophy)	ESPNU	L 14–24	33,514
*Non-conference game; ^{†}Homecoming; Rankings from AP Poll released prior to game; All times are in Central time

Schedule source:

== Roster ==
2015 Illinois Fighting Illini football team roster
Players
Coaches
Offense

Pos.	#	Name	Class
RB	2	Reggie Corbin	Fr
QB	3	Jeff George, Jr.	Fr
WR	4	Dionte Taylor	Jr
RB	5	Ke'Shawn Vaughn	Fr
RB	6	Josh Ferguson	Sr
QB	7	Chayce Crouch	Fr
WR	8	Geronimo Allison	Sr
WR	9	Sam Mays	Fr
QB	10	Jimmy Fitzgerald	Fr
WR	11	Malik Turner	So
QB	12	Wes Lunt	Jr
TE	13	Caleb Reams	Fr
QB	14	Alex Mussat	Fr
WR	15	Tyrin Stone-Davis	Jr
WR	16	Marchie Murdock	So
WR	18	Mike Dudek	So
WR	19	Justin Hardee	Sr
WR	21	Man Berg	So
RB	23	Henry Enyenihi	Sr
RB	25	Kendrick Foster	So
RB	26	Cameron Tucker	Sr
RB	27	Dre Brown	Fr
TE	30	Jim Nudera	Sr
WR	31	Leslie Poole	Sr
TE	39	Nathan Echard	So
TE	42	Chris Royer	Fr
TE	47	Tim Clary	Sr
OL	52	Adam Solomon	Fr
OL	53	Nick Allegretti	Fr
OL	55	Chris Boles	Sr
OL	57	Austin Schmidt	Jr
OL	63	Mike Parisi	Fr
OL	64	Jack Broeker	Fr
OL	66	Jordan Fagan	So
OL	67	Christian DiLauro	So
OL	68	Matt Long	Fr
OL	69	Ted Karras	Sr
OL	70	Max Marietti	Fr
OL	71	Joe Spencer	Jr
OL	72	Gabe Megginson	Fr
OL	73	Chris O'Connor	Sr
OL	74	Connor Brennan	Jr
OL	75	Pat Flavin	Sr
OL	76	Zeke Martin	Fr
OL	78	Harry Black	Jr
OL	79	Zach Heath	Jr
TE	80	Ainslie Johnson	Jr
WR	81	Raphael Barr	So
WR	82	Kameron Fry	Jr
TE	83	Bobby Walker	Fr
WR	84	Jordan Hahn	So
WR	86	Desmond Cain	Fr
TE	87	Tyler White	Jr
WR	88	Zach Grant	Jr
TE	89	Andrew Davis	Jr

Defense

Pos.	#	Name	Class
DB	2	V'Angelo Bentley	Sr
DB	3	Taylor Barton	Fr
STAR	5	James Crawford	So
LEO	6	Carroll Phillips	Jr
DB	7	Caleb Day	Jr
DB	8	Dillan Cazley	Jr
DL	9	Kenny Nelson	Sr
LB	10	B. J. Bello	Jr
DL	11	Chunky Clements	Jr
DB	12	Chris James	Fr
STAR	14	Eric Finney	Sr
DB	15	Jevaris Little	Jr
DL	16	Rob Bain	Jr
DL	17	Jihad Ward	Sr
DB	19	Frank Sumpter	Fr
DB	20	Clayton Fejedelem	Sr
DB	21	Darwyn Kelly	So
DB	21	Patrick Nelson	Fr
LB	22	LaKeith Walls	Jr
DB	23	Davontay Kwaaning	Sr
DB	24	Darius Mosely	Jr
STAR	26	Cedric Doxy	Jr
DB	27	Eaton Spencer	Sr
DB	28	Jaylen Dunlap	So
STAR	29	Nelson Lugo	Jr
DB	29	T. J. Moss	Fr
DB	30	Julian Hylton	Fr
DB	31	Cameron Watkins	Fr
STAR	32	Justice Williams	Fr
LB	33	Tre Watson	Fr
LB	34	Mike Svetina	Jr
LB	35	Sean White	Jr
LB	36	Austin Roberts	Fr
DB	37	Dennis Thurow	So
DB	38	Samuel Harlib	So
LB	40	Jason Goldsmith	Fr
LB	41	Jimmy Marchese	Fr
DL	42	Joe Fotu	Sr
LB	43	Mason Monheim	Sr
LB	44	Julian Jones	Fr
LEO	45	Henry McGrew	Fr
DE	46	Ikjot Wahi	Fr
LEO	47	Sean Adesanya	So
LB	48	Jack Clark	Fr
STAR	49	Conner Schmidt	So
LB	52	T. J. Neal	Jr
DL	55	Jamal Milan	Fr
DL	65	Ryan Walton	So
DL	85	Brandon Roberts	So
DL	90	Altan Aldemir	Fr
LEO	91	Dawuane Smoot	Jr
DL	93	Teko Powell	Jr
DL	94	Tito Odenigbo	Fr
DL	95	Max Loeb	So

Special teams

Pos.	#	Name	Class
K/P	13	Ryan Frain	Jr
K	17	Taylor Zalewski	Sr
K	35	Jonathan Milazzo	Fr
K/P	38	David Reisner	Jr
P	40	Ryan Tucker	Fr
P	46	Luke Nelson	Jr
K	48	Chase McLaughlin	Fr
LS	54	Zach Hirth	Jr
LS	56	Michael Martin	Jr

Head coach

- Bill Cubit - Head Coach and Offensive Coordinator

Coordinators/assistant coaches

- Tim Banks – Co-Defensive Coordinator and Secondary
- Mike Phair – Co-Defensive Coordinator and Defensive Line
- Mike Bellamy – Wide Receivers
- Tom Brattan – Offensive Line
- Ryan Cubit – Quarterback and Recruiting Coordinator
- Alex Golesh – Tight Ends and Special Teams Coordinator
- Nathan Scheelhaase – Running Backs
- Al Seamonson – Outside Linebackers
- Mike Ward – Inside Linebackers
- Tyler Johns - Graduate Assistant
- Reilly O'Toole - Graduate Assistant
- Kaeman Mitchell - Graduate Assistant
- LeDominique Williams - Graduate Assistant
- Scott Yelding - Director of Player Personnel
- Tim Knox - Director of Football Operations
- Patrick Embleton - Director of Football Student-Athlete Development
- Aaron Hillmann - Head Football Strength & Conditioning Coach
- Trent Chestnut - Head Football Equipment Manager
- Alex Benizzi - Director of Football Video

Legend

- (C) Team captain
- (S) Suspended
- (I) Ineligible
- Injured
- Redshirt

Roster
Last update: December 1, 2015
