= Phil Galiano =

American football player and coach (born 1977)

New Orleans Saints
- Title: Special teams coordinator

Personal information
- Born: September 8, 1977 (age 49); Philadelphia, Pennsylvania, U.S.

Career information
- Position: Safety
- College: Shippensburg

Career history
- Dickinson (2000) Outside linebackers coach; New Haven (2001) Outside linebackers coach; Villanova (2002) Offensive assistant; Rutgers (2003) Graduate assistant; Rutgers (2004–2006) Defensive ends coach & linebackers coach; FIU (2007–2009) Defensive coordinator; Rutgers (2010–2011) Defensive line coach & tight ends coach; Tampa Bay Buccaneers (2012–2013) Assistant special teams coach; Rutgers (2014) Director of recruiting; Rutgers (2015) Special teams coordinator & tight ends coach; Miami Dolphins (2016) Special teams intern; Penn State (2017) Defensive consultant; Penn State (2018) Special teams coach & assistant defensive line coach; New Orleans Saints (2019–2024) Assistant special teams coach; New Orleans Saints (2025–present) Special teams coordinator

Phillip H. Galiano (born September 8, 1977), is an American football coach who is the special teams coordinator for the New Orleans Saints of the National Football League (NFL). Galiano played college football at Shippensburg University of Pennsylvania.

== Early life ==
Born in Philadelphia, Galiano graduated in 1995 from Norristown Area High School in Norristown, Pennsylvania.

== College playing career ==
Galiano attended Shippensburg University of Pennsylvania, where he played college football for the Shippensburg Red Raiders from 1995 to 1999. A three-year defensive starter at safety, Galiano also served as a team captain his senior season. During his final three years he helped the Raiders to consecutive winning seasons and a 21–11 record overall. During his Junior season Galiano set a Shippensburg record for the longest fumble return when he took one 95 yards for a touchdown. Despite missing several games due to injury, Galiano finished his career with 250 tackles from the safety position.

== Coaching career ==
Galiano started his coaching career in 2001 as an outside linebacker coach at Dickinson College, an NCAA Division III school. The following season, Galiano coached the same position at the University of New Haven, and NCAA Division II school. From there Galiano switched to the other side of the ball to become an offensive assistant at the NCAA Division I-AA level with Villanova University. In 2003, Galiano began his first stint with the Rutgers Scarlet Knights and head coach Greg Schiano, as a graduate assistant. The following three seasons at Rutgers Galiano coached linebackers (2004) and defensive ends (2005-2006). He then served as the defensive coordinator and linebackers coach at Florida International from 2007 to 2009. Rejoining Rutgers and head coach Greg Schiano, Galiano coached tight ends in 2010 and the defensive line in 2011 for the Scarlet Knights. After 12 years at the collegiate level, Galiano followed Greg Schiano to the Tampa Bay Buccaneers of the NFL. He was added as an assistant special teams coach for the 2012 and 2013 seasons. In 2014, Galiano returned to Rutgers for a third time as head coach Kyle Flood's director of recruiting operations. He spent the 2015 season as the Scarlet Knights special teams coordinator and tight ends coach. At the conclusion of the 2015 season, head coach Kyle Flood was fired and Chris Ash was named Rutgers new head coach. Galiano was not retained for the 2016 season, which led to his return to the NFL to join the Miami Dolphins as a special teams intern. Galiano spent two seasons with the Penn State Nittay Lions serving as a defensive consultant in 2017 and their special teams coordinator and assistant defensive line coach in 2018.

On February 15, 2019, it was announced that Galiano would be leaving Penn State to become an assistant special teams coach with the New Orleans Saints. On February 19, 2025, Galiano was promoted to special teams coordinator following the departure of Darren Rizzi.
