= Norries Wilson =

American football coach (born 1965)

Current position
- Title: Director of player development
- Team: Minnesota
- Conference: Big Ten

Biographical details
- Born: June 24, 1965 (age 61); Markham, Illinois, U.S.

Playing career
- 1985–1988: Minnesota
- Position: Offensive lineman

Coaching career (HC unless noted)
- 1989–1990: Minnesota (GA)
- 1991–1992: North Carolina Central (OL/TE)
- 1993: Livingstone (DC)
- 1995–1996: Bucknell (OL)
- 1997–1998: Bucknell (OC)
- 1999–2001: Connecticut (OL)
- 2002–2005: Connecticut (OC)
- 2006–2011: Columbia
- 2012–2015: Rutgers (RB)
- 2015: Rutgers (interim HC)
- 2017–present: Minnesota (DoPD)

Head coaching record
- Overall: 18–45

Norries Wilson (born June 24, 1965) is an American football coach and former player. Since 2017, he has been the director of player development at the University of Minnesota. He was the first African-American head football coach in the Ivy League when he began his tenure with the Columbia University football team in 2006.

He also has coached at Rutgers University, Bucknell University, Livingstone College, North Carolina Central University, was an offensive co-coordinator at Connecticut and was a graduate assistant at Minnesota.

A 1989 graduate of the University of Minnesota, Wilson was a captain, two-year starter and three-year letterwinner for the Gophers. He also earned two letters in wrestling, and qualified for the NCAA Championships as a heavyweight.

== Coaching career ==
=== Columbia ===
Wilson was hired at Columbia following the 2005 season, during which the Lions finished 0–7 in the Ivy League, 2–8 overall.

Wilson joined Columbia after four years as offensive coordinator at the University of Connecticut. In 2004, he was a finalist for the Frank Broyles Award as the nation's top assistant coach.

With a victory over the Fordham Rams in the 2006 Liberty Cup, he became the first Columbia head football coach since Aldo T. "Buff" Donelli in 1957 to win his debut. When the Lions beat Georgetown the following week, he became the first since Hall of Famer Lou Little to start his career 2–0.

During his first season, Columbia ended a 16-game Ivy League losing streak with a 21–14 victory over Cornell. A 22–21 season-ending win at Brown gave the Lions their first consecutive league victories since 2003.

The Light Blue finished Wilson's inaugural campaign with those two league wins and a 5–5 record overall. It was the first time in a decade that the Lions had finished at .500, and it gave Wilson the highest career winning percentage among Columbia coaches since Charlie Crowley led the team to a 26–16–4 record from 1925 to 1929.

Wilson finished his six seasons at Columbia with a record of 10–32 in Ivy League play and 17–43 overall.

He was relieved of his position by Columbia Athletic Director Diane Murphy on Sunday, November 20, 2011, following a 1–9 season.

=== Rutgers ===
After departing Columbia in 2011, Wilson was hired as a running backs coach and associate head coach by the Rutgers University. Rutgers had hired Kyle Flood as head coach after the departure of Greg Schiano to the National Football League's Tampa Bay Buccaneers.

In September 2015, Rutgers University officials suspended Flood for three games after an investigation into whether he improperly contacted a professor regarding a player's academic status and athletic eligibility. During Flood's suspension, Wilson filled in as interim head coach. Playing in State College, Pennsylvania, on September 19, Rutgers was trounced by the Penn State Nittany Lions, losing by a score of 28–3. The following week, on September 26, Rutgers defeated the visiting Kansas Jayhawks, 27–14. On October 10, Rutgers was defeated at home by Michigan State, 31–24, in his final game as interim head coach.

Wilson took responsibility for the quarterback spiking the ball on a fourth down play against Michigan State in 2015. Although he did not instruct the quarterback to do so.

=== Minnesota ===
During the 2020 season, Wilson stepped in as interim-Offensive Line coach for the Gopher's game against Purdue University. Minnesota went on to win the game 34-31.

== Head coaching record ==
Year	Team	Overall	Conference	Standing	Bowl/playoffs
Columbia Lions (Ivy League) (2006–2011)
2006	Columbia	5–5	2–5	6th	
2007	Columbia	1–9	0–7	8th	
2008	Columbia	2–8	2–5	6th	
2009	Columbia	4–6	3–4	4th	
2010	Columbia	4–6	2–5	6th	
2011	Columbia	1–9	1–6	8th	
Columbia:		17–43	10–32		
Rutgers Scarlet Knights (Big Ten Conference) (2015)
2015	Rutgers	1–2	0–2		
Rutgers:		1–2	0–2		
Total:		18–45			
