= 2015 Northwestern Wildcats football team =

American college football season

2015 Northwestern Wildcats football

Outback Bowl, L 6–45 vs. Tennessee
- Conference: Big Ten Conference
- West Division

Ranking
- Coaches: No. 22
- AP: No. 23
- Record: 10–3 (6–2 Big Ten)
- Head coach: Pat Fitzgerald (10th season)
- Offensive coordinator: Mick McCall (8th season)
- Offensive scheme: Spread
- Defensive coordinator: Mike Hankwitz (8th season)
- Base defense: Multiple 4–3
- Home stadium: Ryan Field

2015 Big Ten Conference football standings
	Conf.			Overall
Team	W		L	W		L
East Division
No. 6 Michigan State xy$^	7	–	1	12	–	2
No. 4 Ohio State x	7	–	1	12	–	1
No. 12 Michigan	6	–	2	10	–	3
Penn State	4	–	4	7	–	6
Indiana	2	–	6	6	–	7
Rutgers	1	–	7	4	–	8
Maryland	1	–	7	3	–	9
West Division
No. 9 Iowa xy	8	–	0	12	–	2
No. 23 Northwestern	6	–	2	10	–	3
No. 21 Wisconsin	6	–	2	10	–	3
Nebraska	3	–	5	6	–	7
Minnesota	2	–	6	6	–	7
Illinois	2	–	6	5	–	7
Purdue	1	–	7	2	–	10
Championship: Michigan State 16, Iowa 13
^ – College Football Playoff participant; $ – Conference champion; x – Division champion/co-champions; y – Championship game participant; Rankings from AP Poll

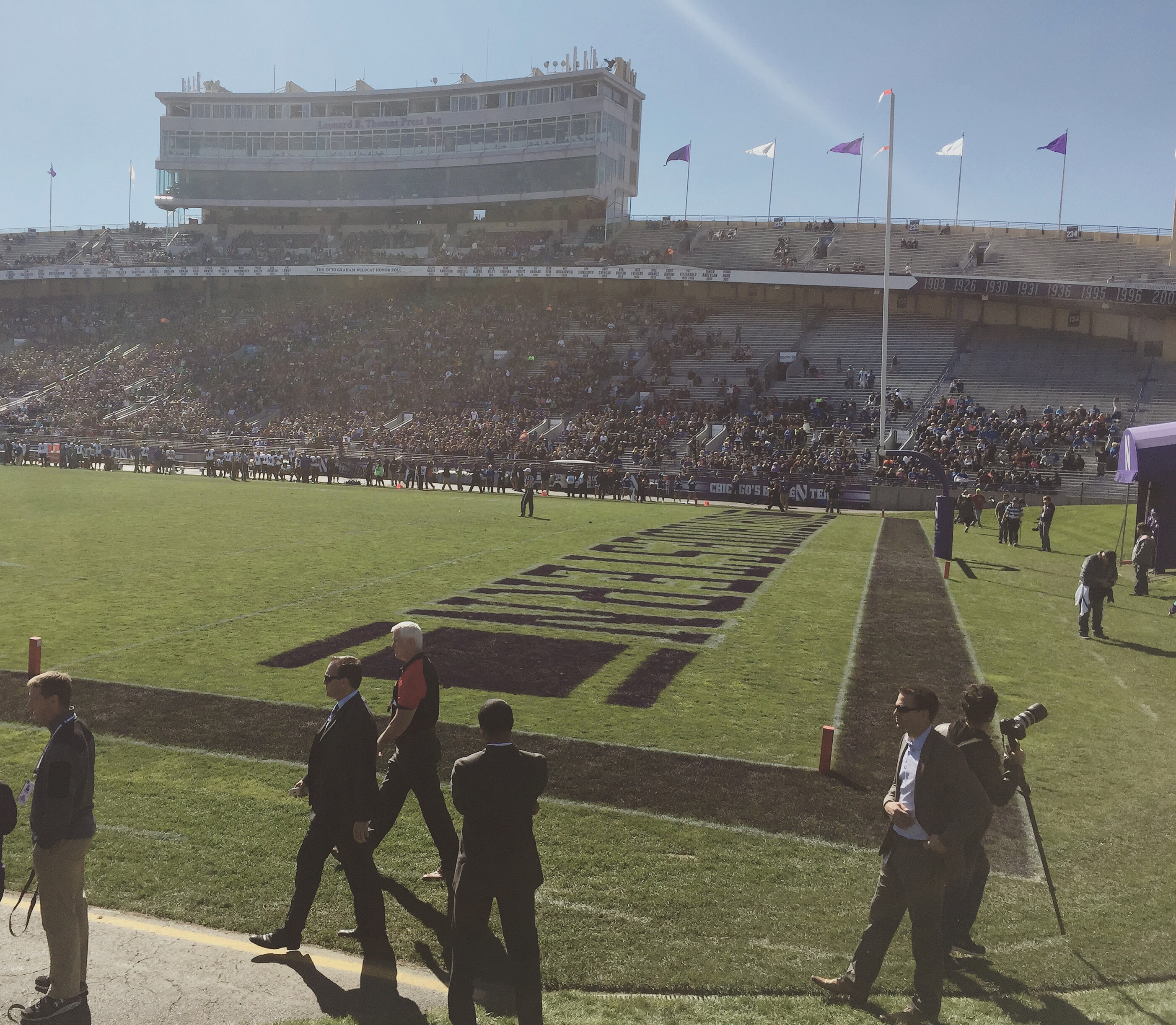

The 2015 Northwestern Wildcats football team represented Northwestern University during the 2015 NCAA Division I FBS football season. It was Pat Fitzgerald's tenth season as the team's head coach. The Wildcats home games were played at Ryan Field in Evanston, Illinois. They were members of the West Division of the Big Ten Conference. They finished the season 10–3, 6–2 in Big Ten play to finish in a tie for second place in the West Division. They were invited to the Outback Bowl where they were defeated by Tennessee 45–6.

== Schedule ==
Northwestern announced their 2015 football schedule on June 3, 2013. The 2015 schedule consisted of 7 home and 5 away games in the regular season. The Wildcats hosted Big Ten foes Iowa, Minnesota, Penn State, and Purdue and travelled to Illinois, Michigan, Nebraska, and Wisconsin.

The Wildcats hosted three of their four non conference games against Ball State, Eastern Illinois and Stanford. Northwestern traveled to Durham, North Carolina to face Duke of the Atlantic Coast Conference on September 19.

Date	Time	Opponent	Rank	Site	TV	Result	Attendance
September 5	11:00 a.m.	No. 21 Stanford*		Ryan Field; Evanston, IL	ESPN	W 16–6	36,024
September 12	3:00 p.m.	Eastern Illinois*		Ryan Field; Evanston, IL	ESPNews	W 41–0	29,131
September 19	11:30 a.m.	at Duke*	No. 23	Wallace Wade Stadium; Durham, NC	ACCN	W 19–10	24,127
September 26	7:00 p.m.	Ball State*	No. 17	Ryan Field; Evanston, IL	BTN	W 24–19	30,107
October 3	11:00 a.m.	Minnesota	No. 16	Ryan Field; Evanston, IL	BTN	W 27–0	30,044
October 10	2:30 p.m.	at No. 18 Michigan	No. 13	Michigan Stadium; Ann Arbor, MI (rivalry)	BTN	L 0–38	110,452
October 17	11:00 a.m.	No. 17 Iowa^{†}	No. 20	Ryan Field; Evanston, IL	ABC/ESPN2	L 10–40	44,135
October 24	11:00 a.m.	at Nebraska		Memorial Stadium; Lincoln, NE	ESPN2	W 30–28	89,493
November 7	11:00 a.m.	Penn State	No. 21	Ryan Field; Evanston, IL	ESPNU	W 23–21	34,116
November 14	11:00 a.m.	Purdue	No. 18	Ryan Field; Evanston, IL	BTN	W 21–14	30,003
November 21	2:30 pm	at No. 25 Wisconsin	No. 20	Camp Randall Stadium; Madison, WI	BTN	W 13–7	75,276
November 28	2:30 pm	vs. Illinois	No. 16	Soldier Field; Chicago, IL (rivalry)	ESPNU	W 24–14	33,514
January 1, 2016	11:00 a.m.	vs. No. 23 Tennessee*	No. 13	Raymond James Stadium; Tampa, FL (Outback Bowl)	ESPN2	L 6–45	53,202
*Non-conference game; ^{†}Homecoming; Rankings from AP Poll and CFP Rankings after November 3 released prior to game; All times are in Central time

Schedule source:

== Rankings ==
Ranking movements Legend: ██ Increase in ranking ██ Decrease in ranking — = Not ranked RV = Received votes
	Week															
Poll	Pre	1	2	3	4	5	6	7	8	9	10	11	12	13	14	Final
AP	—	RV	23	17	16	13	20	RV	RV	RV	24	20	17	13	12	23
Coaches	—	RV	24	19	17	14	21	RV	RV	RV	24	21	17	13	12	22
CFP	Not released									21	18	20	16	14	13	Not released

== Roster ==
2015 Northwestern Wildcats football team roster
Players
Coaches
Offense

Pos.	#	Name	Class
WR	2	Christian Salem	Jr
RB	4	Solomon Vault	So
WR	5	Miles Shuler	Sr
WR	6	Mike McHugh	Jr
QB	7	Matt Alviti	So
WR	8	Stephen Buckley	Jr
SB	9	Garrett Dickerson	So
QB	10	Zack Oliver	Sr
QB	11	T. J. Green	Fr
WR	11	Pierre Youngblood-Ary	Sr
RB	12	Auston Anderson	Fr
RB	13	Warren Long	Jr
WR	14	Christian Jones (C)	Sr
QB	14	Lloyd Yates	Fr
WR	15	Macan Wilson	So
WR	16	Quinn Baker	So
QB	17	Daniel Kubiuk	Fr
QB	18	Clayton Thorson	Fr
WR	19	Cameron Dickerson	Sr
RB	20	John Moten IV	Fr
RB	21	Justin Jackson	So
WR	24	Mark Gorogianis	So
WR	25	Luke Dauch	Sr
WR	36	Corey Acker	So
SB	40	Dan Vitale (C)	Sr
WR	43	Cole Johnson	So
SB	46	Eric Lutzen	Fr
OL	53	Geoff Mogus	Sr
OL	57	Matt Frazier	Sr
OL	59	J. B. Butler	Fr
OL	63	Ian Park	Jr
OL	64	Andrew Otterman	Fr
OL	65	Jared Thomas	Fr
OL	68	Connor Mahoney	Jr
OL	69	Brad North	So
OL	70	Shane Mertz	Sr
OL	71	Tommy Doles	Fr
OL	72	Blake Hance	Fr
OL	73	Adam DePietro	Jr
OL	74	Graham Bullmore	So
OL	76	Eric Oloson	Jr
OL	78	Adam Lemke-Bell	Fr
OL	79	Sam Coverdale	So
WR	80	Austin Carr	Jr
WR	81	Jelani Roberts	Fr
WR	82	Andrew Scanlan	Jr
WR	83	Chad Hanaoka	So
WR	84	Cameron Green	Fr
WR	85	Chris Cliff	Fr
SB	85	Mark Szott	Sr
WR	86	Flynn Nagel	Fr
WR	87	Garrett Kidd	Sr
SB	88	Jayme Taylor	So
WR	89	Charlie Fessler	Fr

Defense

Pos.	#	Name	Class
DL	1	Max Chapman	Sr
S	2	Traveon Henry (C)	Sr
CB	3	Keith Watkins II	So
DL	7	Ifeadi Odenigbo	Jr
DB	10	Jake Murray	Fr
DL	13	Deonte Gibson (C)	Sr
S	16	Godwin Igwebuike	So
CB	17	Marcus McShepard	So
LB	18	Anthony Walker	So
S	21	Kyle Queiro	So
CB	22	Parrker Westphal	Fr
CB	23	Nick VanHoose	Sr
CB	24	Montre Hartage	Fr
S	26	Terrance Brown	Jr
CB	27	Matthew Harris	Jr
DB	28	Alonzo Mayo	Fr
DB	29	Trae Williams	Fr
LB	31	Tommy Vitale	Fr
LB	32	Nate Hall	Fr
DB	33	Steven Reese	Fr
LB	34	Simba Short	Fr
LB	35	Tom Hruby	Jr
DB	38	Dami Arowolaju	Jr
S	41	Jared McGee	Fr
LB	42	Joseph Jones	Jr
DL	44	James Prather	Fr
LB	45	Nathan Fox	Fr
LB	46	Anthony Pierce-Adams	Fr
DB	47	Joe Bergin	Fr
S	48	Tommy Odell	So
LB	49	Josh Roberts	So
LB	51	Jaylen Prater	Jr
LB	53	Cameron Queiro	Fr
DL	54	Trent Goens	Fr
LB	55	Drew Smith	Sr
LB	56	Brett Walsh	So
DL	58	Heath Reineke	Fr
DL	67	Tyler Lancaster	So
DL	90	C. J. Robbins	Sr
DL	92	Kenton Playko	Fr
DL	93	Greg Kuhar	Jr
DL	94	Dean Lowry	Sr
DL	95	Jordan Thompson	Fr
DL	97	Joe Gaziano	Fr
DL	98	Xavier Washington	So
DL	99	Ben Oxley	Fr

Special teams

Pos.	#	Name	Class
K	7	Jack Mitchell	Jr
K, P	33	Matt Micucci	Jr
K	38	Arthur Omilian	Sr
K	38	Mason Weissenhofer	Fr
LS	52	Chaz Fitzpatrick	Jr
P, K	96	Hunter Niswander	So

Head coach

- Pat Fitzgerald

Coordinators/assistant coaches

- Randy Bates (Linebackers)
- Jerry Brown (Defensive Backs)
- Adam Cushing (Offensive Line)
- Mike Hankwitz (Defensive Coordinator)
- Bob Heffner (Superbacks)
- Marty Long (Defensive Line)
- Matt MacPherson (Running Backs / Recruiting Coordinator)
- Mick McCall (Offensive Coordinator / Quarterbacks)
- Dennis Springer (Wide Receivers)
- Clay Bignell (Defensive Graduate Assistant)
- Chris Bowers (Director of Player Personnel)
- Cody Cejda (Director of Football Operations)
- Darby Dunnagan (Director of Video Operations)
- David Girardi (Defensive Graduate Assistant)
- Dan Hernandez (Offensive Graduate Assistant)
- Jay Hooten (Director of Sports Performance for Football)
- Tommy Rees (Offensive Graduate Assistant)
- Jacob Schmidt (Director of Player Development)
- Troy Sutton (Assistant Director of Sports Performance for Football)
- Mike Jasinski (Recruiting Intern)

Legend

- (C) Team captain
- (S) Suspended
- (I) Ineligible
- Injured
- Redshirt

Roster
Last update: December 30, 2015
