= 2015 Maryland Terrapins football team =

American college football season

2015 Maryland Terrapins football
- Conference: Big Ten Conference
- East Division
- Record: 3–9 (1–7 Big Ten)
- Head coach: Randy Edsall (5th season; first 6 games); Mike Locksley (interim, final 6 games)
- Offensive coordinator: Mike Locksley (4th season)
- Offensive scheme: Multiple
- Defensive coordinator: Keith Dudzinski (1st season)
- Base defense: 3–4
- Home stadium: Byrd Stadium

2015 Big Ten Conference football standings
	Conf.			Overall
Team	W		L	W		L
East Division
No. 6 Michigan State xy$^	7	–	1	12	–	2
No. 4 Ohio State x	7	–	1	12	–	1
No. 12 Michigan	6	–	2	10	–	3
Penn State	4	–	4	7	–	6
Indiana	2	–	6	6	–	7
Rutgers	1	–	7	4	–	8
Maryland	1	–	7	3	–	9
West Division
No. 9 Iowa xy	8	–	0	12	–	2
No. 23 Northwestern	6	–	2	10	–	3
No. 21 Wisconsin	6	–	2	10	–	3
Nebraska	3	–	5	6	–	7
Minnesota	2	–	6	6	–	7
Illinois	2	–	6	5	–	7
Purdue	1	–	7	2	–	10
Championship: Michigan State 16, Iowa 13
^ – College Football Playoff participant; $ – Conference champion; x – Division champion/co-champions; y – Championship game participant; Rankings from AP Poll

The 2015 Maryland Terrapins football team represented the University of Maryland, College Park in the 2015 NCAA Division I FBS football season. The Terrapins were led by fifth-year head coach Randy Edsall, who was fired after starting the season 2–4. Offensive coordinator Mike Locksley was promoted to interim head coach for the remainder of the season. They played their home games at Byrd Stadium. They finished the season 3–9 and 1–7 in Big Ten play to finish in last place in the East Division.

== Schedule ==
Maryland announced its 2015 football schedule on June 3, 2013. The 2015 schedule consisted of six home, five away, and one neutral site game in the regular season. The Terrapins hosted Big Ten foes Indiana, Michigan, and Wisconsin and traveled to Iowa, Michigan State, defending champion Ohio State, and Rutgers. Maryland played Penn State in Baltimore at M&T Bank Stadium for the 39th meeting of their rivalry

The Terrapins hosted three of their four non-conference games against Bowling Green, Richmond and South Florida (USF). Maryland traveled to Morgantown, West Virginia to face rival West Virginia of the Big 12 Conference on September 26.

Date	Time	Opponent	Site	TV	Result	Attendance
September 5	12:00 pm	No. 18 (FCS) Richmond*	Byrd Stadium; College Park, MD	ESPNU	W 50–21	38,117
September 12	12:00 pm	Bowling Green*	Byrd Stadium; College Park, MD	BTN	L 27–48	36,332
September 19	12:00 pm	South Florida*	Byrd Stadium; College Park, MD	ESPNU	W 35–17	36,827
September 26	3:00 pm	at West Virginia*	Mountaineer Field; Morgantown, WV (rivalry)	FS1	L 6–45	61,174
October 3	12:00 pm	No. 22 Michigan	Byrd Stadium; College Park, MD	BTN	L 0–28	51,802
October 10	12:00 pm	at No. 1 Ohio State	Ohio Stadium; Columbus, OH	BTN	L 28–49	107,869
October 24	3:30 pm	vs. Penn State	M&T Bank Stadium; Baltimore, MD (rivalry)	ESPN	L 30–31	68,948
October 31	3:30 pm	at No. 10 Iowa	Kinnick Stadium; Iowa City, IA	ABC/ESPN2	L 15–31	62,667
November 7	3:30 pm	Wisconsin^{†}	Byrd Stadium; College Park, MD	BTN	L 24–31	44,678
November 14	12:00 pm	at No. 14 Michigan State	Spartan Stadium; East Lansing, MI	ESPN2	L 7–24	73,406
November 21	12:00 pm	Indiana	Byrd Stadium; College Park, MD	BTN	L 28–47	33,685
November 28	12:00 pm	at Rutgers	High Point Solutions Stadium; Piscataway, NJ	BTN	W 46–41	44,846
*Non-conference game; ^{†}Homecoming; Rankings from AP Poll released prior to the game; All times are in Eastern time

== Roster ==
2015 Maryland Terrapins football team roster
Players
Coaches
Offense

Pos.	#	Name	Class
WR	1	D. J. Moore	Fr
QB	2	Shane Cockerille	So
RB	5	Wes Brown	Jr
RB	6	Ty Johnson	Fr
WR	6	Zac Morton	Fr
QB	7	Caleb Rowe	Jr
WR	8	Levern Jacobs	Jr
QB	11	Perry Hills	Jr
WR	12	Tavion Jacobs	Jr
WR	13	DeAndre Lane	Jr
QB	14	Gage Shaffer	Fr
QB	16	Dexter Foreman	Sr
QB	18	Daxx Garman	Sr
RB	29	Joe Riddle	Jr
RB	30	Kenneth Goins	Jr
RB	33	Andrew Stefanelli	Jr
RB	35	Marcus Smith	So
FB	40	Eddison Reinoso	So
RB	42	Tehuti Miles	Jr
TE	44	Andrew Isaacs	Jr
RB	45	Brandon Ross	Sr
TE	48	Derrick Hayward	So
OL	50	Evan Mulrooney	Sr
OL	53	Quarvez Boulware	Fr
OL	54	JaJuan Dulaney	So
OL	55	Ryan Doyle	Sr
OL	58	Damian Prince	Fr
OL	60	Stephen Grommer	Sr
OL	63	Mike Minter	So
OL	64	Brendan Moore	Fr
OL	65	Mason Zimmerman	Fr
OL	66	Andrew Zeller	Sr
OL	68	Ellis McKennie	Fr
OL	69	Joe Marchese	So
OL	70	Sean Christie	Fr
OL	71	E. J. Donahue	Fr
OL	74	Tyler Smith	Fr
OL	75	Derwin Gray	Fr
OL	76	Michael Dunn	Jr
OL	77	Will McClain	Fr
OL	79	Maurice Shelton	Jr
WR	81	Josh Bekoe	Jr
TE	82	Avery Edwards	Fr
WR	83	Malcolm Culmer	Jr
WR	84	Amba Etta-Tawo	Jr
WR	85	Jahrvis Davenport	Fr
TE	86	Andrew Gray	Fr
WR	87	Michael Cornwell	Fr
TE	88	P. J. Gallo	Jr
TE	89	Eric Roca	So

Defense

Pos.	#	Name	Class
DB	2	Milan Collins	So
DB	3	Milan Barry-Pollock	Jr
DB	4	William Likely	Jr
DL	7	Yannick Ngakoue	Jr
LB	9	Tyler Burke	Fr
DB	11	Denzel Conyers	Jr
DB	17	Josh Woods	So
DB	19	A. J. Hendy	Sr
DB	20	Anthony Nixon	Sr
DB	21	Sean Davis	Sr
ILB	22	Isaiah Davis	Fr
LB	23	Jermaine Carter	So
DB	24	Daniel Ezeagwu	So
DB	24	J. T. Ventura	So
DB	25	Antwaine Carter	So
DB	26	Darnell Savage	So
DB	27	Alvin Hill	Jr
LB	31	Nnamdi Egbuaba	Fr
DB	32	Jarrett Ross	Jr
LB	34	Jefferson Ashiru	Sr
DB	36	Elvis Dennah	So
LB	37	Avery Thompson	Sr
ILB	38	Brett Zanotto	Fr
DL	39	Cavon Walker	Jr
DL	41	Jesse Aniebonam	So
LB	42	Brock Dean	Jr
LB	43	Jalen Brooks	So
LB	46	Abner Logan	Jr
DE	47	Melvin Keihn	So
DL	49	Ruben Franco	Jr
ILB	49	Gus Little	Fr
DL	52	Malik Jones	So
LB	56	Matt Gillespie	Fr
DL	57	Kingsley Opara	So
DL	59	Keiron Howard	Fr
OLB	61	Mbi Tanyi	Fr
DL	67	David Shaw	So
DL	78	Ty Tucker	Jr
DL	90	Roman Braglio	Jr
DL	92	Chandler Burkett	So
DL	93	Oseh Saine	Fr
DL	95	Azubuike Ukandu	Jr
DL	96	Brett Kulka	Fr
DL	99	Quinton Jefferson	Jr

Special teams

Pos.	#	Name	Class
K	3	Adam Greene	So
K	15	Brad Craddock	Sr
P	16	Nicholas Rubinowicz	Fr
P	38	Lee Shrader	Fr
LS	51	Matt Oliveira	Fr
LS	56	Nate Adams	So
LS	59	Christian Carpenter	Jr
P, K	95	Nicolas Pritchard	Fr
K, P	97	Daniel Sutton	So

Head coach

- Randy Edsall
- Mike Locksley (Interim Head Coach / Offensive Coordinator / Quarterbacks)

Coordinators/assistant coaches

- Keith Dudzinski (Defensive coordinator / Inside Linebackers)
- John Dunn (Tight Ends / Recruiting Coordinator)
- Lyndon Johnson (Assistant head coach / Outside Linebackers)
- Keenan McCardell (Wide Receivers)
- Greg Studrawa (Offensive Line)
- Chad Wilt (Defensive Line)
- Terry Richardson (Running Backs)
- Darrell Perkins (Defensive Backs)

Legend

- (C) Team captain
- (S) Suspended
- (I) Ineligible
- Injured
- Redshirt

Roster
Last update: January 11, 2016
