= Jim Panagos =

American football player and coach (born 1971)

Current position
- Title: Defensive tackles coach
- Team: Kansas Jayhawks
- Conference: Big 12

Biographical details
- Born: March 23, 1971 (age 55); Brooklyn, New York

Playing career
- 1992: Maryland
- Position: Defensive tackle

Coaching career (HC unless noted)
- 1993: Maryland (ADL)
- 1994–1997: C. R. James Alt School (FL) (assistant)
- 2002–2003: Minnesota Vikings (DQC)
- 2004–2005: Minnesota Vikings (ADL)
- 2007–2011: UCF (DL)
- 2012–2015: Rutgers (DL)
- 2016: Pittsburgh (volunteer)
- 2017: Temple (DL)
- 2018: Temple (DL/AHC)
- 2019: Minnesota (DL)
- 2020–2021: Rutgers (DL)
- 2022–present: Kansas (DT)

Jim Panagos (born 1975) is an American football coach who is the defensive tackles coach at the University of Kansas.

== Coaching career ==
=== Minnesota Vikings ===
Panagos joined the Minnesota Vikings as an offensive assistant and quality control coach in 2002. His title was defensive quality control coach from 2003 to 2004. In 2005, he was named assistant defensive line coach and assistant special teams coach.

=== UCF Knights ===
Panagos was the defensive line coach at the University of Central Florida from 2007 to 2011.

=== Rutgers ===
After leaving UCF, Panagos served as the defensive line coach for Rutgers underneath Kyle Flood from 2012 to 2015.

=== Pittsburgh ===
Panagos spent the 2016 season as a defensive consultant with Pittsburgh

=== Temple ===
In January 2017, Panagos was named the defensive line coach for Temple underneath new Temple coach Geoff Collins. Panagos had previously worked with Collins at UCF. During his first season at Temple, Panagos led a defensive line that finished No. 11 in the nation in sacks. Panagos was named a semi-finalist for the Broyles Award, given annually to the nation's top assistant coach.

=== Minnesota ===
In 2019, Panagos was the defensive line coach for Minnesota.

=== Return to Rutgers ===
On December 14, 2019, it was announced that Jim was leaving Minnesota to return to Rutgers to once again be their defensive line coach.

=== Kansas ===
In January 2022, Panagos joined Lance Leipold's staff at Kansas as the defensive tackles coach.
