= Kyle Flood =

American football player and coach (born 1971)

Current position
- Title: Offensive coordinator
- Team: Texas
- Conference: SEC

Biographical details
- Born: January 20, 1971 (age 55); Queens, New York, U.S.

Playing career
- 1989–1992: Iona
- Position: Offensive lineman

Coaching career (HC unless noted)
- 1993–1994: St. Francis (NY) Prep (OL/DL)
- 1995–1996: C. W. Post (OL)
- 1997–2001: Hofstra (OL)
- 2002–2004: Delaware (AHC/OL)
- 2005–2006: Rutgers (OL)
- 2007: Rutgers (OL/RGC)
- 2008: Rutgers (AHC/OL)
- 2009–2010: Rutgers (AHC/OC/OL)
- 2011: Rutgers (AHC/OL)
- 2012–2015: Rutgers
- 2017–2018: Atlanta Falcons (AOL)
- 2019–2020: Alabama (OL)
- 2021–present: Texas (OC/OL)

Head coaching record
- Overall: 27–24
- Bowls: 1–2

Accomplishments and honors

Championships
- 1 Big East (2012)

Awards
- Big East Coach of the Year (2012)

Kyle J. Flood (born January 20, 1971) is an American football coach and former player. He is currently the offensive coordinator and offensive line coach for the Texas Longhorns football team. He is also the former head football coach of the Rutgers Scarlet Knights. Flood was named the 29th head football coach of the Rutgers Scarlet Knights football team after Greg Schiano accepted the National Football League head coaching position for the Tampa Bay Buccaneers. He is the first Rutgers football head coach to be promoted from assistant since the 1973 season. Flood is a graduate of Iona College and earned four varsity letters for the Gaels between 1989 and 1992.

== Playing career ==
=== High school ===
Flood played high school football as a high school teammate of former Rutgers All-American tight end Marco Battaglia at St. Francis Preparatory School.

=== College ===
Flood, a 1993 graduate of Iona College, was a four-year letterwinner for the Gaels. Flood earned first team All-Liberty Conference honors in 1991 and served as team captain of the Gaels in 1992.

== Coaching career ==
=== Rutgers ===
Flood was hired as the offensive line coach for the Scarlet Knights in 2005. In 2008, he was promoted to assistant head coach under Greg Schiano. On January 31, 2012, Flood was hired to replace Schiano, who had been named the Tampa Bay Buccaneers' head coach.

==== Inaugural season in the Big Ten ====
The team went 4–0 in non-conference play with wins over Washington State, Howard, Navy, and Tulane. Flood led the Scarlet Knights to his first ever bowl victory and the sixth overall for Rutgers over the North Carolina Tar Heels, 40–21 in the inaugural Quick Lane Bowl, giving Rutgers a respectable 8–5 record in its first Big Ten season.

==== Controversies over player misconduct ====
The 2015 football season was marred by alleged misconduct by Flood and the arrests on violent felony criminal charges of several players. There were doubts that Flood would be coaching the season opener and some speculation amongst news media and fans about the possibility of Flood's firing or resignation. The 15-member Rutgers Board of Governors, one of the school's two governing bodies, met with university president Robert Barchi on September 11 in a closed-door emergency session to discuss ongoing "athletic matters" and the potential for litigation.

- On May 24, 2015, redshirt freshman defensive back Darian Dailey was arrested in Florida on felony robbery charges.
- In late August 2015, Flood suspended five players for the first half of the season opener for breaking curfew.
- On September 3, 2015, six players were arrested and charged with felony assault, armed robbery, criminal restraint, conspiracy, riot, and weapons possession; these charges stemmed from an April 26, 2015 incident in New Brunswick, New Jersey characterized as a home invasion robbery. Five players were dismissed from the team moments before the season-opening football game against the Norfolk State Spartans. A sixth player was arrested a few days later. Several arrested players had previous arrests for other criminal charges.
- One of the suspects in the home invasion robbery and assault was the center of an ongoing investigation into Flood for possible violations of school policy and NCAA regulations for claims that Flood contacting faculty regarding the academic status of a player. Flood defied academic support staff by contacting a professor to attempt to establish the player's eligibility. On September 16, 2015, the university-led investigation determined that Flood's conduct was improper and Barchi fined Flood $50,000 and suspended him for three games. Rutgers associate head coach Norries Wilson coached the three games against Penn State, Kansas, and Michigan State.

=== Atlanta Falcons ===
On February 17, 2017, Flood was hired by the Atlanta Falcons to be the assistant offensive line coach.

=== Alabama ===
In 2019, Flood was hired to be the new offensive line coach for the Alabama Crimson Tide under head coach Nick Saban. During the 2020–2021 season, Flood was a part of the coaching staff that won the 2021 College Football Playoff National Championship.

=== Texas ===
In 2021, Flood was hired to be the new offensive coordinator and offensive line coach for the Texas Longhorns, joining new head coach Steve Sarkisian. This is Flood's first offensive coordinator job since the 2009–2010 season when he led the Rutgers offense.

== Head coaching record ==
| Year | Team | Overall | Conference | Standing | Bowl/playoffs |
|---|---|---|---|---|---|
Rutgers Scarlet Knights (Big East Conference) (2012)
| 2012 | Rutgers | 9–4 | 5–2 | T–1st | L Russell Athletic |
Rutgers Scarlet Knights (American Athletic Conference) (2013)
| 2013 | Rutgers | 6–7 | 3–5 | T–6th | L Pinstripe |
Rutgers Scarlet Knights (Big Ten Conference) (2014–2015)
| 2014 | Rutgers | 8–5 | 3–5 | T–4th (East) | W Quick Lane |
| 2015 | Rutgers | 3–6 | 1–5 | T–6th (East) | |
| Rutgers: | | 26–22 | 12–17 | | |
| Total: | | 26–22 | | | |
National championship Conference title Conference division title or championship game berth
