= 2016 in American football =

== 2015–16 NCAA bowl games ==
- December 19, 2015 – January 11, 2016: 2015–16 NCAA football bowl games

=== 2015–16 College Football Playoff Bowl Games ===
- Note: Both Cotton Bowl Classic and Orange Bowl winners qualify to compete in the championship game.
- December 31, 2015
- 2015 Peach Bowl in Atlanta
  - The Houston Cougars defeated the Florida State Seminoles, with the score of 38–24.
- 2015 Cotton Bowl Classic in Arlington
  - The Alabama Crimson Tide defeated the Michigan State Spartans, with the score of 38–0.
- 2015 Orange Bowl in Miami Gardens
  - The Clemson Tigers defeated the Oklahoma Sooners, with the score of 37–17.
- January 1, 2016
- 2016 Fiesta Bowl in Glendale
  - The Ohio State Buckeyes defeated the Notre Dame Fighting Irish, with the score of 44–28.
- 2016 Rose Bowl in Pasadena
  - The Stanford Cardinal defeated the Iowa Hawkeyes, with the score of 45–16.
- 2016 Sugar Bowl in New Orleans
  - The Ole Miss Rebels defeated the Oklahoma State Cowboys, with the score of 48–20.

=== 2016 College Football Playoff National Championship ===
- January 11, 2016: 2016 College Football Playoff National Championship in Glendale
  - The Alabama Crimson Tide defeated the Clemson Tigers, with the score of 45–40.

=== 2015–16 Non-CFP bowl games ===
- December 19, 2015
- 2015 Cure Bowl in Orlando (debut event)
  - The San Jose State Spartans defeated the Georgia State Panthers, with the score of 27–16.
- 2015 New Mexico Bowl in Albuquerque
  - The Arizona Wildcats defeated the New Mexico Lobos, with the score of 45–37.
- 2015 Las Vegas Bowl in Whitney
  - The Utah Utes defeated the BYU Cougars, with the score of 35–28.
- 2015 Camellia Bowl in Montgomery
  - The Appalachian State Mountaineers defeated the Ohio Bobcats, with the score of 31–29.
- 2015 New Orleans Bowl in Louisiana
  - The Louisiana Tech Bulldogs defeated the Arkansas State Red Wolves, with the score of 47–28.
- December 21, 2015
- 2015 Miami Beach Bowl in Florida
  - The Western Kentucky Hilltoppers defeated the South Florida Bulls, with the score of 45–35.
- December 22, 2015
- 2015 Famous Idaho Potato Bowl in Boise
  - The Akron Zips defeated the Utah State Aggies, with the score of 23–21.
- 2015 Boca Raton Bowl in Florida
  - The Toledo Rockets defeated the Temple Owls, with the score of 32–17.
- December 23, 2015
- 2015 Poinsettia Bowl in San Diego
  - The Boise State Broncos defeated the Northern Illinois Huskies, with the score of 55–7.
- 2015 GoDaddy Bowl in Mobile
  - The Georgia Southern Eagles defeated the Bowling Green Falcons, with the score of 58–27.
- December 24, 2015
- 2015 Bahamas Bowl in Nassau
  - The Western Michigan Broncos defeated the Middle Tennessee Blue Raiders, with the score of 45–31.
- 2015 Hawaii Bowl in Honolulu
  - The San Diego State Aztecs defeated the Cincinnati Bearcats, with the score of 42–7.
- December 26, 2015
- 2015 St. Petersburg Bowl in Florida
  - The Marshall Thundering Herd defeated the Connecticut Huskies, with the score of 16–10.
- 2015 Sun Bowl in El Paso
  - The Washington State Cougars defeated the Miami Hurricanes, with the score of 20–14.
- 2015 Heart of Dallas Bowl in Texas
  - The Washington Huskies defeated the Southern Miss Golden Eagles, with the score of 44–31.
- 2015 Pinstripe Bowl in The Bronx (New York City)
  - The Duke Blue Devils defeated the Indiana Hoosiers, with the score of 44–41.
- 2015 Independence Bowl in Shreveport
  - The Virginia Tech Hokies defeated the Tulsa Golden Hurricane, with the score of 55–52.
- 2015 Foster Farms Bowl in Santa Clara
  - The Nebraska Cornhuskers defeated the UCLA Bruins, with the score of 37–29.
- December 28, 2015
- 2015 Military Bowl in Annapolis
  - The Navy Midshipmen defeated the Pittsburgh Panthers, with the score of 44–28.
- 2015 Quick Lane Bowl in Detroit
  - The Minnesota Golden Gophers defeated the Central Michigan Chippewas, with the score of 21–14.
- December 29, 2015
- 2015 Armed Forces Bowl in Fort Worth
  - The California Golden Bears defeated the Air Force Falcons, with the score of 55–36.
- 2015 Russell Athletic Bowl in Orlando
  - The Baylor Bears defeated the North Carolina Tar Heels, with the score of 49–38.
- 2015 Arizona Bowl in Tucson (debut event)
  - The Nevada Wolf Pack defeated the Colorado State Rams, with the score of 28–23.
- 2015 Texas Bowl in Houston
  - The LSU Tigers defeated the Texas Tech Red Raiders, with the score of 56–27.
- December 30, 2015
- 2015 Birmingham Bowl in Alabama
  - The Auburn Tigers defeated the Memphis Tigers, with the score of 31–10.
- 2015 Belk Bowl in Charlotte
  - The Mississippi State Bulldogs defeated the NC State Wolfpack, with the score of 51–28.
- 2015 Music City Bowl in Nashville
  - The Louisville Cardinals defeated the Texas A&M Aggies, with the score of 27–21.
- 2015 Holiday Bowl in San Diego
  - The Wisconsin Badgers defeated the USC Trojans, with the score of 23–21.
- January 1, 2016
- 2016 Outback Bowl in Tampa
  - The Tennessee Volunteers defeated the Northwestern Wildcats, with the score of 45–6.
- 2016 Citrus Bowl in Orlando
  - The Michigan Wolverines defeated the Florida Gators, with the score of 41–7.
- January 2, 2016
- 2016 TaxSlayer Bowl in Jacksonville
  - The Georgia Bulldogs defeated the Penn State Nittany Lions, with the score of 24–17.
- 2016 Liberty Bowl in Memphis
  - The Arkansas Razorbacks defeated the Kansas State Wildcats, with the score of 45–23.
- 2016 Alamo Bowl in San Antonio
  - The TCU Horned Frogs defeated the Oregon Ducks, with the score of 47–41.
- 2016 Cactus Bowl in Phoenix
  - The West Virginia Mountaineers defeated the Arizona State Sun Devils, with the score of 36–32.

== National Football League ==
- January 31: 2016 Pro Bowl in Honolulu at Aloha Stadium
  - Team Irvin defeated Team Rice, with the score of 49–27.
  - Offensive MVP: Russell Wilson (Seattle Seahawks)
  - Defensive MVP: Michael Bennett (Seattle Seahawks)
- February 7: Super Bowl 50 in Santa Clara, California at Levi's Stadium
  - The Denver Broncos defeated the Carolina Panthers, 24–10, to win their third Super Bowl title.
  - MVP: Von Miller (Denver Broncos)
- April 28 – 30: 2016 NFL draft in Chicago at the Auditorium Theatre
  - #1 pick: Jared Goff, from the California Golden Bears to the Los Angeles Rams
- September 8 – January 1, 2017: 2016 NFL season
  - Regular season's AFC winner: New England Patriots
  - Regular season's NFC winner: Dallas Cowboys

== FISU ==
- June 1 – 11: 2016 World University American Football Championship in Monterrey
  - In the final, Mexico defeated United States, 35–7, to win their second World University Championship. Japan took third place.

== IFAF ==
- June 28 – July 10: 2016 IFAF U-19 World Championship in Harbin at the Harbin University of Commerce
  - Canada defeated the United States, 24–6, to win their second IFAF U-19 World Championship title. Mexico took third place.
- September 7 – 12: 2016 IFAF Flag Football World Championship in Miami
  - Men: The United States defeated Denmark, 33–32, to win their second consecutive and third overall IFAF Flag Football World Championship title.
  - Mexico took the bronze medal.
  - Women: Panama defeated Austria, 35–22, to win their first IFAF Flag Football World Championship title.
  - Mexico took the bronze medal.

== Pro Football Hall of Fame ==
- Class of 2016:
  - Tony Dungy, player and coach
  - Brett Favre, player
  - Kevin Greene, player
  - Marvin Harrison, player
  - Orlando Pace, player
  - Ken Stabler, player
  - Dick Stanfel, player
