= 2015 Big 12 Conference football season =

American college football season

- League: NCAA Division I FBS
- Sport: Football
- Duration: August 2015–January 2016
- Teams: 10
- TV partner(s): ABC, ESPN, FOX, FSN, FS1, LHN

2016 NFL Draft
- Top draft pick: Karl Joseph (West Virginia)
- Picked by: Oakland Raiders, 14th overall

Regular season
- Champion: Oklahoma

Football seasons
- 2014 2016

2015 Big 12 Conference football standings
	Conf.			Overall
Team	W		L	W		L
No. 5 Oklahoma $^	8	–	1	11	–	2
No. 20 Oklahoma State	7	–	2	10	–	3
No. 7 TCU	7	–	2	11	–	2
No. 13 Baylor	6	–	3	10	–	3
West Virginia	4	–	5	8	–	5
Texas Tech	4	–	5	7	–	6
Texas	4	–	5	5	–	7
Kansas State	3	–	6	6	–	7
Iowa State	2	–	7	3	–	9
Kansas	0	–	9	0	–	12
^ – College Football Playoff participant; $ – Conference champion; Rankings from AP Poll

The 2015 Big 12 Conference football season was the 20th season of college football play for the Big 12 Conference. It is part of the 2015 NCAA Division I FBS football season.

== Preseason ==
=== Big 12 Media preseason poll ===
	Big 12 Media
1.	TCU (32)
2.	Baylor (10)
3.	Oklahoma
4.	Oklahoma State
5.	Texas
6.	West Virginia
7.	Kansas State
8.	Texas Tech
9.	Iowa State
10.	Kansas

() first place votes

=== Preseason All-Big 12 ===
2015 Pre-season Coaches All-Big 12

- Offensive Player of the Year: Trevone Boykin, TCU, QB
- Defensive Player of the Year: Shawn Oakman, Baylor, DE
- Newcomer of the Year: Chris Carson, Oklahoma State, RB

First team offense
Position	Player	Class	Team
QB	Trevone Boykin	Senior	TCU
RB	Shock Linwood	Junior	Baylor
RB	Samaje Perine	Sophomore	Oklahoma
FB	Glenn Gronkowski	Junior	Kansas State
WR	Corey Coleman	Junior	Baylor
WR	Sterling Shepard	Senior	Oklahoma
WR	Josh Doctson	Senior	TCU
TE	Tre'von Armstead	Junior	Baylor
OL	Spencer Drango	Senior	Baylor
OL	Cody Whitehair	Senior	Kansas State
C	Joey Hunt	Senior	TCU
OL	Halapoulivaati Vaitai	Senior	TCU
OL	Le'Raven Clark	Senior	Texas Tech

First team defense
Position	Player	Class	Team
DL	Andrew Billings	Junior	Baylor
DL	Shawn Oakman	Senior	Baylor
DL	Emmanuel Ogbah	Junior	Oklahoma State
DL	Davion Pierson	Senior	TCU
DL	Pete Robertson	Senior	Texas Tech
LB	Eric Striker	Senior	Oklahoma
LB	Ryan Simmons	Senior	Oklahoma State
LB	Nick Kwiatkoski	Senior	West Virginia
DB	Orion Stewart	Junior	Baylor
DB	Dante Barnett	Senior	Kansas State
DB	Zack Sanchez	Junior	Oklahoma
DB	Kevin Peterson	Senior	Oklahoma State
DB	Duke Thomas	Senior	Texas
DB	Karl Joseph	Senior	West Virginia

First Team Special Teams
Position	Player	Class	Team
K	Josh Lambert	Junior	West Virginia
P	Tyler Symmank	Senior	Texas Tech
KR/PR	Alex Ross	Junior	Oklahoma

== Rankings ==
Legend
	Increase in ranking
	Decrease in ranking
	Not ranked previous week
RV	Received votes but were not ranked in Top 25 of poll

		Pre	Wk 1	Wk 2	Wk 3	Wk 4	Wk 5	Wk 6	Wk 7	Wk 8	Wk 9	Wk 10	Wk 11	Wk 12	Wk 13	Wk 14	Wk 15	Final
Baylor	AP	4	4	5	5	5	3	2	2	2								
Baylor	C	4	4	5	4	4	4	2	2	2								
Baylor	CFP	Not released																
Iowa State	AP																	
Iowa State	C																	
Iowa State	CFP	Not released																
Kansas	AP																	
Kansas	C																	
Kansas	CFP	Not released																
Kansas State	AP	RV	RV	RV	RV	RV	RV											
Kansas State	C	RV	RV	RV	RV	RV	RV	RV										
Kansas State	CFP	Not released																
Oklahoma	AP	19	19	16	15	15	10	19	17	14								
Oklahoma	C	19	17	17	14	14	9	19	15	13								
Oklahoma	CFP	Not released																
Oklahoma State	AP	RV	RV	25	24	20	21	16	14	12								
Oklahoma State	C	RV	RV	25	22	19	19	15	12	10								
Oklahoma State	CFP	Not released																
TCU	AP	2	3	3	3	4	2	3	4	5								
TCU	C	2	3	3	2	3	2	3	3	3								
TCU	CFP	Not released																
Texas	AP	RV																
Texas	C	RV						RV										
Texas	CFP	Not released																
Texas Tech	AP				RV	RV	RV	RV	RV									
Texas Tech	C			RV	RV	RV		RV	RV									
Texas Tech	CFP	Not released																
West Virginia	AP	RV	RV	RV	RV	23	RV											
West Virginia	C	RV	RV	RV	RV	21	RV	RV										
West Virginia	CFP	Not released																

== Regular season ==
=== Week One ===
Date	Time	Visiting team	Home team	Site	Broadcast	Result	Attendance
September 3	6:00 p.m.	Oklahoma State	Central Michigan	Kelly/Shorts Stadium • Mount Pleasant, MI	ESPNU	W 24–13	19,717
September 3	8:00 p.m.	#2 TCU	Minnesota	TCF Bank Stadium • Minneapolis, MN	ESPN	W 23–17	54,147
September 4	6:00 p.m.	#4 Baylor	SMU	Gerald J. Ford Stadium • University Park, TX	ESPN	W 56–21	32,047
September 5	11:00 a.m.	#16 (FCS) South Dakota State	Kansas	Memorial Stadium • Lawrence, KS	FSN	L 38–41	30,144
September 5	2:30 p.m.	#3 (FCS) Sam Houston	Texas Tech	Jones AT&T Stadium • Lubbock, TX	FSN	W 59–45	60,073
September 5	6:00 p.m.	Akron	#19 Oklahoma	Gaylord Family Oklahoma Memorial Stadium • Norman, OK	FSN	W 41–3	85,370
September 5	6:00 p.m.	South Dakota	Kansas State	Bill Snyder Family Football Stadium • Manhattan, KS	K-StateHD.TV	W 34–0	53,297
September 5	6:30 p.m.	Texas	#11 Notre Dame	Notre Dame Stadium • South Bend, IN	NBC	L 3–38	80,795
September 5	6:30 p.m.	Georgia Southern	West Virginia	Mountaineer Field • Morgantown, WV	FSN	W 44–0	55,182
September 5	7:00 p.m.	#10 (FCS) Northern Iowa	Iowa State	Jack Trice Stadium • Ames, IA	Cyclones.tv	W 31–7	61,500

Players of the week:

Offensive		Defensive		Special teams	
Player	Team	Player	Team	Player	Team
Patrick Mahomes, QB	Texas Tech	Karl Joseph, S	West Virginia	Jakeem Grant, KR	Texas Tech

=== Week Two ===
Date	Time	Visiting team	Home team	Site	Broadcast	Result	Attendance
September 12	11:00 a.m.	Kansas State	UTSA	Alamodome • San Antonio, TX	FS1	W 30–3	29,424
September 12	2:00 p.m.	UTEP	Texas Tech	Jones AT&T Stadium • Lubbock, TX	FSN	W 69–20	54,090
September 12	2:00 p.m.	#15 (FCS) Liberty	West Virginia	Mountaineer Field • Morgantown, WV	RTPT	W 41–17	52,899
September 12	2:30 p.m.	Stephen F. Austin	#3 TCU	Amon G. Carter Stadium • Fort Worth, TX	FS1	W 70–7	45,786
September 12	3:45 p.m.	Iowa	Iowa State	Jack Trice Stadium • Ames, IA (Battle for the Cy-Hawk Trophy)	FOX	L 17–31	61,500
September 12	5:00 p.m.	#19 Oklahoma	#23 Tennessee	Neyland Stadium • Knoxville, TN	ESPN	W 31–24 ^{2OT}	102,455
September 12	6:00 p.m.	Memphis	Kansas	Memorial Stadium • Lawrence, KS	JTV	L 23–55	37,798
September 12	6:30 p.m.	Lamar	#4 Baylor	McLane Stadium • Waco, TX	FSN	W 66–31	44,491
September 12	6:30 p.m.	Central Arkansas	Oklahoma State	Boone Pickens Stadium • Stillwater, OK	FSN	W 32–8	56,262
September 12	7:00 p.m.	Rice	Texas	Darrell K Royal–Texas Memorial Stadium • Austin, TX	LHN	W 42–28	86,458

Players of the week:

Offensive		Defensive		Special teams	
Player	Team	Player	Team	Player	Team
Corey Coleman, WR; Patrick Mahomes, QB	Baylor; Texas Tech	Zack Sanchez, CB	Oklahoma	Daje Johnson, PR/KR	Texas

=== Week Three ===
Date	Time	Visiting team	Home team	Site	Broadcast	Result	Attendance
September 19	11:00 a.m.	Tulsa	#16 Oklahoma	Gaylord Family Oklahoma Memorial Stadium • Norman, OK	FS1	W 52–38	85,657
September 19	2:00 p.m.	Louisiana Tech	Kansas State	Bill Snyder Family Football Stadium • Manhattan, KS	FSN	W 39–33 ^{3OT}	53,540
September 19	2:30 p.m.	UTSA	#25 Oklahoma State	Boone Pickens Stadium • Stillwater, OK	FS1	W 69–14	54,351
September 19	6:00 p.m.	Texas Tech	Arkansas	Donald W. Reynolds Razorback Stadium • Fayetteville, AR	ESPN2	W 35–24	73,334
September 19	6:30 p.m.	California	Texas	Darrell K Royal–Texas Memorial Stadium • Austin, TX	FOX	L 44–45	91,568
September 19	7:00 p.m.	SMU	#3 TCU	Amon G. Carter Stadium • Fort Worth, TX (Battle for the Iron Skillet)	FSN	W 56–37	48,127
September 19	7:00 p.m.	Iowa State	Toledo	Glass Bowl • Toledo, OH	ESPNews	L 23–30 ^{2OT}	23,104

Players of the week:

Offensive		Defensive		Special teams	
Player	Team	Player	Team	Player	Team
Baker Mayfield, QB; Trevone Boykin, QB	Oklahoma; TCU	Jah’Shawn Johnson, DB	Texas Tech	Jack Cantele, PK	Kansas State

=== Week Four ===
Date	Time	Visiting team	Home team	Site	Broadcast	Result	Attendance
September 26	11:00 a.m.	Kansas	Rutgers	High Point Solutions Stadium • Piscataway, NJ	BTN	L 14–27	46,136
September 26	2:00 p.m.	Rice	#5 Baylor	McLane Stadium • Waco, TX	FSN	W 70–17	43,619
September 26	2:00 p.m.	Maryland	West Virginia	Mountaineer Field • Morgantown, WV (Rivalry)	FS1	W 45–6	61,176
September 26	2:30 p.m.	#24 Oklahoma State	Texas	Darrell K Royal–Texas Memorial Stadium • Austin, TX	ESPN	OSU 30–27	87,073
September 26	3:45 p.m.	#3 TCU	Texas Tech	Jones AT&T Stadium • Lubbock, TX (Rivalry)	FOX	TCU 55–52	61,283

Players of the week:

Offensive		Defensive		Special teams	
Player	Team	Player	Team	Player	Team
Josh Doctson, WR	TCU	Emmanuel Ogbah, DE	Oklahoma State	Ben Grogan, PK	Oklahoma State

=== Week Five ===
Date	Time	Visiting team	Home team	Site	Broadcast	Result	Attendance
October 3	11:00 a.m.	Kansas	Iowa State	Jack Trice Stadium • Ames, IA	FSN	ISU 38–13	55,837
October 3	11:00 a.m.	#23 West Virginia	#15 Oklahoma	Gaylord Family Oklahoma Memorial Stadium • Norman, OK	FS1	OU 44–24	84,384
October 3	11:00 a.m.	Texas	#4 TCU	Amon G. Carter Stadium • Fort Worth, TX	ABC	TCU 50–7	48,694
October 3	2:30 p.m.	Texas Tech	#5 Baylor	AT&T Stadium • Arlington, TX (Texas Shootout)	ABC/ESPN2	BU 63–35	56,179
October 3	3:00 p.m.	Kansas State	#20 Oklahoma State	Boone Pickens Stadium • Stillwater, OK	FS1	OSU 36–34	57,618

Players of the week:

Offensive		Defensive		Special teams	
Player	Team	Player	Team	Player	Team
Mason Rudolph, QB; KaVontae Turpin, WR	Oklahoma State; TCU	Eric Striker, LB	Oklahoma	Austin Seibert, PK/P	Oklahoma

=== Week Six ===
Date	Time	Visiting team	Home team	Site	Broadcast	Result	Attendance
October 10	11:00 a.m.	#3 Baylor	Kansas	Memorial Stadium • Lawrence, KS	FS1	BU 66–7	25,910
October 10	11:00 a.m.	#10 Oklahoma	Texas	Cotton Bowl • Dallas, TX (Red River Showdown)	ABC	UT 24–17	91,546
October 10	2:30 p.m.	Iowa State	Texas Tech	Jones AT&T Stadium • Lubbock, TX	FSN	TTU 66–31	53,891
October 10	6:00 p.m.	#21 Oklahoma State	West Virginia	Mountaineer Field • Morgantown, WV	ESPN2	OSU 33–26 ^{OT}	60,410
October 10	6:30 p.m.	#2 TCU	Kansas State	Bill Snyder Family Football Stadium • Manhattan, KS	FOX	TCU 52–45	53,671

Players of the week:

Offensive		Defensive		Special teams	
Player	Team	Player	Team	Player	Team
Trevone Boykin, QB	TCU	Emmanuel Ogbah, DE; Malik Jefferson, LB	Oklahoma State; Texas	Zach Sinor, P	Oklahoma State

=== Week Seven ===
Date	Time	Visiting team	Home team	Site	Broadcast	Result	Attendance
October 17	11:00 a.m.	West Virginia	#2 Baylor	McLane Stadium • Waco, TX	FOX	BU 62–38	45,370
October 17	11:00 a.m.	Texas Tech	Kansas	Memorial Stadium • Lawrence, KS	FS1	TTU 30–20	25,186
October 17	2:30 p.m.	#19 Oklahoma	Kansas State	Bill Snyder Family Football Stadium • Manhattan, KS	ABC	OU 55–0	52,867
October 17	6:00 p.m.	#3 TCU	Iowa State	Jack Trice Stadium • Ames, IA	ESPN2	TCU 45–21	52,480

Players of the week:

Offensive		Defensive		Special teams	
Player	Team	Player	Team	Player	Team
Seth Russell, QB	Baylor	Zack Sanchez, CB	Oklahoma	Shelton Gibson, KR	West Virginia

=== Week Eight ===
Date	Time	Visiting team	Home team	Site	Broadcast	Result	Attendance
October 24	11:00 a.m.	Iowa State	#2 Baylor	McLane Stadium • Waco, TX	ESPN	BU 45–27	45,512
October 24	11:00 a.m.	Kansas State	Texas	Darrell K Royal–Texas Memorial Stadium • Austin, TX	FS1	UT 23–9	88,283
October 24	2:30 p.m.	Kansas	Oklahoma State	Boone Pickens Stadium • Stillwater, OK	FS1	OSU 58–10	59,486
October 24	2:30 p.m.	Texas Tech	#17 Oklahoma	Gaylord Family Oklahoma Memorial Stadium • Norman, OK	ABC/ESPN2	OU 63–27	85,312

=== Week Nine ===
Date	Time	Visiting team	Home team	Site	Broadcast	Result	Attendance
October 29	6:30 p.m.	West Virginia	#5 TCU	Amon G. Carter Stadium • Fort Worth, TX	FS1	TCU 40–10	45,947
October 31	2:30 p.m.	#12 Oklahoma State	Texas Tech	Jones AT&T Stadium • Lubbock, TX	ESPN	OSU 70–53	54,872
October 31	2:30 p.m.	#14 Oklahoma	Kansas	Memorial Stadium • Lawrence, KS	FS1	OU 62–7	26,677
October 31	6:00 p.m.	Texas	#17 Iowa State	Jack Trice Stadium • Ames, IA	FS1	ISU 24–0	53,616

=== Week Ten ===
Date	Time	Visiting team	Home team	Site	Broadcast	Result	Attendance
November 5	6:30 p.m.	#6 Baylor	Kansas State	Bill Snyder Family Football Stadium • Manhattan, KS	FS1	BU 31–24	52,108
November 7	12:00 p.m.	Texas Tech	West Virginia	Mountaineer Field • Morgantown, WV	FS1	WVU 31–26	54,932
November 7	2:30 p.m.	#8 TCU	#14 Oklahoma State	Boone Pickens Stadium • Stillwater, OK	FOX	OSU 49–29	59,061
November 7	6:00 p.m.	Iowa State	#15 Oklahoma	Gaylord Family Oklahoma Memorial Stadium • Norman, OK	ESPNU	OU 52–16	85,595
November 7	7:00 p.m.	Kansas	Texas	Darrell K Royal–Texas Memorial Stadium • Austin, TX	LHN	UT 59–20	92,529

=== Week Eleven ===
Date	Time	Visiting team	Home team	Site	Broadcast	Result	Attendance
November 14	11:00 a.m.	Kansas	#15 TCU	Amon G. Carter Stadium • Fort Worth, TX	FS1	TCU 23–17	44,375
November 14	11:00 a.m.	Texas	West Virginia	Mountaineer Field • Morgantown, WV	ESPNU	WVU 38–20	56,736
November 14	2:30 p.m.	Kansas State	Texas Tech	Jones AT&T Stadium • Lubbock, TX	FS1	TTU 59–44	53,833
November 14	2:30 p.m.	#8 Oklahoma State	Iowa State	Jack Trice Stadium • Ames, IA	ESPN	OSU 35–31	54,180
November 14	7:00 p.m.	#12 Oklahoma	#6 Baylor	McLane Stadium • Waco, TX	ABC	OU 44–34	49,875

=== Week Twelve ===
Date	Time	Visiting team	Home team	Site	Broadcast	Result	Attendance
November 21	11:00 a.m.	West Virginia	Kansas	Memorial Stadium • Lawrence, KS	FSN	WVU 49–0	21,415
November 21	11:00 a.m.	Iowa State	Kansas State	Bill Snyder Family Football Stadium • Manhattan, KS	FS1	KSU 38–35	53,297
November 21	6:30 p.m.	#10 Baylor	#6 Oklahoma State	Boone Pickens Stadium • Stillwater, OK	FOX	BU 45–35	58,669
November 21	7:00 p.m.	#18 TCU	#7 Oklahoma	Gaylord Family Oklahoma Memorial Stadium • Norman, OK	ABC	OU 30–29	85,821

=== Week Thirteen ===
Date	Time	Visiting team	Home team	Site	Broadcast	Result	Attendance
November 26	6:30 p.m.	Texas Tech	Texas	Darrell K Royal–Texas Memorial Stadium • Austin, TX	FS1	TTU 48–45	94,299
November 27	6:30 p.m.	#7 Baylor	#19 TCU	Amon G. Carter Stadium • Fort Worth, TX	ESPN	TCU 28–21 2OT	47,675
November 28	11:00 a.m.	Iowa State	West Virginia	Mountaineer Field • Morgantown, WV	FS1	WVU 30–6	42,446
November 28	3:00 p.m.	Kansas State	Kansas	Memorial Stadium • Lawrence, KS	FS1	KSU 45–14	92,529
November 28	7:00 p.m.	#3 Oklahoma	#11 Oklahoma State	Boone Pickens Stadium • Stillwater, OK	ABC	OU 58–23	58,231

=== Week Fourteen ===
Date	Time	Visiting team	Home team	Site	Broadcast	Result	Attendance
December 5	11:00 a.m.	Texas	#12 Baylor	McLane Stadium • Waco, TX	ESPN	UT 23–17	48,093
December 5	3:30 p.m.	West Virginia	Kansas State	Bill Snyder Family Football Stadium • Manhattan, KS	FS1	KSU 30–6	42,446

=== Bowl Games ===
Date	Time	Visiting team	Home team	Site	Broadcast	Result	Attendance
December 29	4:30 p.m.	#10 North Carolina	#17 Baylor	Orlando Citrus Bowl Stadium • Orlando, FL (Russell Athletic Bowl)	ESPN	W 49–38	40,418
December 29	8:00 p.m.	#22 LSU	Texas Tech	NRG Stadium • Houston, TX (Texas Bowl)	ESPN	L 27–56	71,054
December 31	3:00 p.m.	#4 Oklahoma	#1 Clemson	Sun Life Stadium• Miami Gardens, Florida (Orange Bowl – CFP Semifinal)	ESPN	L 17–37	67,615
January 1	7:30 p.m.	#16 Oklahoma State	#12 Ole Miss	Mercedes-Benz Superdome • New Orleans, LA (Sugar Bowl)	ESPN	L 20–48	72,117
January 2	2:20 p.m.	Kansas State	Arkansas	Liberty Bowl Memorial Stadium • Memphis, TN (Liberty Bowl)	ESPN	L 23–45	61,136
January 2	5:45 p.m.	#15 Oregon	#11 TCU	Alamodome • San Antonio, TX (Alamo Bowl)	ESPN	W 47–41 ^{3OT}	61,136
January 2	9:15 p.m.	West Virginia	Arizona State	Chase Field • Phoenix, AZ (Cactus Bowl)	ESPN	W 43–42	39,321
