= List of College Football Playoff games =

The following is a list of College Football Playoff games. For the 2014–15 through 2023–24 seasons, the semifinals rotated between the Rose, Sugar, Cotton, Orange, Fiesta, and Peach bowls, with each hosting a semifinal every third year. A standalone National Championship game is held roughly a week later.

Beginning in the 2024–25 season, the Playoff expanded to 12 teams, with four rounds. The first round is played on campus sites, the quarterfinals and semifinals rotate among the same six Bowl games, along with the standalone National Championship game.

Beginning in the 2027-28 season, the Playoff will expand to 24 teams, with five rounds. The first two rounds will be played on campus sites, the quarterfinals and semifinals will continue to rotate among the same six Bowl games, along with the standalone National Championship game.

== Four-team playoff (2015–2024) ==
=== 2014–15 ===
Round	Bowl game	Winning team		Losing team		Date	Venue	Location	TV	Attendance
Semifinal	Rose Bowl	2 Oregon	59	3 Florida State	20	January 1	Rose Bowl	Pasadena, CA	ESPN	91,322
Semifinal	Sugar Bowl	4 Ohio State	42	1 Alabama	35	January 1	Mercedes-Benz Superdome	New Orleans, LA	ESPN	74,682
Championship	National; Championship	4 Ohio State	42	2 Oregon	20	January 12	AT&T Stadium	Arlington, TX	ESPN	85,689

=== 2015–16 ===
Round	Bowl game	Winning team		Losing team		Date	Venue	Location	TV	Attendance
Semifinal	Orange Bowl	1 Clemson	37	4 Oklahoma	17	December 31	SunLife Stadium	Miami Gardens, FL	ESPN	67,615
Semifinal	Cotton Bowl	2 Alabama	38	3 Michigan State	0	December 31	AT&T Stadium	Arlington, TX	ESPN	82,812
Championship	National; Championship	2 Alabama	45	1 Clemson	40	January 11	University of Phoenix Stadium	Glendale, AZ	ESPN	75,765

=== 2016–17 ===
Round	Bowl game	Winning team		Losing team		Date	Venue	Location	TV	Attendance
Semifinal	Peach Bowl	1 Alabama	24	Washington	7	December 31	Georgia Dome	Atlanta, GA	ESPN	75,996
Semifinal	Fiesta Bowl	2 Clemson	31	3 Ohio State	0	December 31	University of Phoenix Stadium	Glendale, AZ	ESPN	70,236
Championship	National; Championship	2 Clemson	35	1 Alabama	31	January 9	Raymond James Stadium	Tampa, FL	ESPN	74,512

=== 2017–18 ===
Round	Bowl game	Winning team		Losing team		Date	Venue	Location	TV	Attendance
Semifinal	Rose Bowl	3 Georgia	54^{2OT}	2 Oklahoma	48	January 1	Rose Bowl	Pasadena, CA	ESPN	92,844
Semifinal	Sugar Bowl	4 Alabama	24	1 Clemson	6	January 1	Mercedes-Benz Superdome	New Orleans, LA	ESPN	72,360
Championship	National; Championship	4 Alabama	26^{OT}	3 Georgia	23	January 8	Mercedes-Benz Stadium	Atlanta, GA	ESPN	77,430

=== 2018–19 ===
Round	Bowl game	Winning team		Losing team		Date	Venue	Location	TV	Attendance
Semifinal	Cotton Bowl	2 Clemson	30	3 Notre Dame	3	December 29	AT&T Stadium	Arlington, TX	ESPN	72,183
Semifinal	Orange Bowl	1 Alabama	45	4 Oklahoma	34	December 29	Hard Rock Stadium	Miami Gardens, FL	ESPN	66,203
Championship	National; Championship	2 Clemson	44	1 Alabama	16	January 7	Levi's Stadium	Santa Clara, CA	ESPN	74,814

=== 2019–20 ===
Round	Bowl game	Winning team		Losing team		Date	Venue	Location	TV	Attendance
Semifinal	Peach Bowl	1 LSU	63	4 Oklahoma	28	December 27	Mercedes-Benz Stadium	Atlanta, GA	ESPN	78,347
Semifinal	Fiesta Bowl	3 Clemson	29	2 Ohio State	23	December 27	State Farm Stadium	Glendale, AZ	ESPN	71,330
Championship	National; Championship	1 LSU	42	3 Clemson	25	January 13	Mercedes-Benz Superdome	New Orleans, LA	ESPN	76,885

=== 2020–21 ===
Round	Bowl game	Winning team		Losing team		Date	Venue	Location	TV	Attendance
Semifinal	Rose Bowl	1 Alabama	31	4 Notre Dame	14	January 1	AT&T Stadium (Note: The 2021 Rose Bowl was moved away from its traditional venue (the Rose Bowl in Pasadena, CA) due to the COVID-19 pandemic.)	Arlington, TX	ESPN	18,373 (Note: Stadium capacity was limited due to the COVID-19 pandemic.)
Semifinal	Sugar Bowl	3 Ohio State	49	2 Clemson	28	January 1	Mercedes-Benz Superdome	New Orleans, LA	ESPN	3,000
Championship	National; Championship	1 Alabama	52	3 Ohio State	24	January 11	Hard Rock Stadium	Miami Gardens, FL	ESPN	14,926

=== 2021–22 ===
Round	Bowl game	Winning team		Losing team		Date	Venue	Location	TV	Attendance
Semifinal	Cotton Bowl	1 Alabama	27	4 Cincinnati	6	December 31	AT&T Stadium	Arlington, TX	ESPN	76,313
Semifinal	Orange Bowl	3 Georgia	34	2 Michigan	11	December 31	Hard Rock Stadium	Miami Gardens, FL	ESPN	66,839
Championship	National; Championship	3 Georgia	33	1 Alabama	18	January 10	Lucas Oil Stadium	Indianapolis, IN	ESPN	68,311

=== 2022–23 ===
Round	Bowl game	Winning team		Losing team		Date	Venue	Location	TV	Attendance
Semifinal	Fiesta Bowl	3 TCU	51	2 Michigan	45	December 31	State Farm Stadium	Glendale, AZ	ESPN	71,723
Semifinal	Peach Bowl	1 Georgia	42	4 Ohio State	41	December 31	Mercedes-Benz Stadium	Atlanta, GA	ESPN	79,330
Championship	National; Championship	1 Georgia	65	3 TCU	7	January 9	SoFi Stadium	Inglewood, CA	ESPN	72,628

=== 2023–24 ===
Round	Bowl game	Winning team		Losing team		Date	Venue	Location	TV	Attendance
Semifinal	Rose Bowl	1 Michigan	27^{OT}	4 Alabama	20	January 1	Rose Bowl	Pasadena, CA	ESPN	96,371
Semifinal	Sugar Bowl	2 Washington	37	3 Texas	31	January 1	Caesars Superdome	New Orleans, LA	ESPN	68,791
Championship	National; Championship	1 Michigan	34	2 Washington	13	January 8	NRG Stadium	Houston, TX	ESPN	72,808

== 12-team playoff (2024–2027) ==
=== 2024–25 ===
Round	Bowl game	Winning team		Losing team		Date	Venue	Location	TV	Attendance
First round	None (On-campus)	7 Notre Dame	27	10 Indiana	17	December 20	Notre Dame Stadium	Notre Dame, IN	ABC/ ESPN	77,622
First round	None (On-campus)	6 Penn State	38	11 SMU	10	December 21	Beaver Stadium	University Park, PA	TNT/ Max	106,013
First round	None (On-campus)	5 Texas	38	12 Clemson	24	December 21	Darrell K Royal– Texas Memorial Stadium	Austin, TX	TNT/ Max	101,150
First round	None (On-campus)	8 Ohio State	42	9 Tennessee	17	December 21	Ohio Stadium	Columbus, OH	ABC/ ESPN	102,819
Quarterfinal	Fiesta Bowl	6 Penn State	31	3 Boise State	14	December 31	State Farm Stadium	Glendale, AZ	ESPN	63,854
Quarterfinal	Peach Bowl	5 Texas	39^{2OT}	4 Arizona State	31	January 1	Mercedes-Benz Stadium	Atlanta, GA	ESPN	71,105
Quarterfinal	Rose Bowl	8 Ohio State	41	1 Oregon	21	January 1	Rose Bowl	Pasadena, CA	ESPN	90,732
Quarterfinal	Sugar Bowl	7 Notre Dame	23	2 Georgia	10	January 2	Caesars Superdome	New Orleans, LA	ESPN	57,267
Semifinal	Orange Bowl	7 Notre Dame	27	6 Penn State	24	January 9	Hard Rock Stadium	Miami Gardens, FL	ESPN	66,881
Semifinal	Cotton Bowl	8 Ohio State	28	5 Texas	14	January 10	AT&T Stadium	Arlington, TX	ESPN	74,527
Championship	National; Championship	8 Ohio State	34	7 Notre Dame	23	January 20	Mercedes-Benz Stadium	Atlanta, GA	ESPN	77,660

=== 2025–26 ===
Round	Bowl game	Winning team		Losing team		Date	Venue	Location	TV	Attendance
First round	None (On-campus)	9 Alabama	34	8 Oklahoma	24	December 19	Gaylord Family; Oklahoma Memorial Stadium	Norman, OK	ABC/ ESPN	83,550
First round	None (On-campus)	10 Miami (FL)	10	7 Texas A&M	3	December 20	Kyle Field	College Station, TX	ABC/ ESPN	104,122
First round	None (On-campus)	6 Ole Miss	41	11 Tulane	10	December 20	Vaught–Hemingway Stadium	Oxford, MS	TNT/ HBO Max	68,251
First round	None (On-campus)	5 Oregon	51	12 James Madison	34	December 20	Autzen Stadium	Eugene, OR	TNT/ HBO Max	55,124
Quarterfinal	Cotton Bowl	10 Miami (FL)	24	2 Ohio State	14	December 31	AT&T Stadium	Arlington, TX	ESPN	71,323
Quarterfinal	Orange Bowl	5 Oregon	23	4 Texas Tech	0	January 1	Hard Rock Stadium	Miami Gardens, FL	ESPN	65,021
Quarterfinal	Rose Bowl	1 Indiana	38	9 Alabama	3	January 1	Rose Bowl	Pasadena, CA	ESPN	90,278
Quarterfinal	Sugar Bowl	6 Ole Miss	39	3 Georgia	34	January 1	Caesars Superdome	New Orleans, LA	ESPN	68,371
Semifinal	Fiesta Bowl	10 Miami (FL)	31	6 Ole Miss	27	January 8	State Farm Stadium	Glendale, AZ	ESPN	67,928
Semifinal	Peach Bowl	1 Indiana	56	5 Oregon	22	January 9	Mercedes-Benz Stadium	Atlanta, GA	ESPN	75,604
Championship	National; Championship	1 Indiana	27	10 Miami (FL)	21	January 19	Hard Rock Stadium	Miami Gardens, FL	ESPN	67,227
