= 2015–16 College Football Playoff =

Postseason college football tournament

- Season: 2015
- Dates: December 31, 2015 – January 11, 2016
- Teams invited: (1) Clemson; (2) Alabama; (3) Michigan State; (4) Oklahoma
- Venues: AT&T Stadium; Sun Life Stadium; University of Phoenix Stadium
- Champions: Alabama (1st CFP title, 16th overall title)

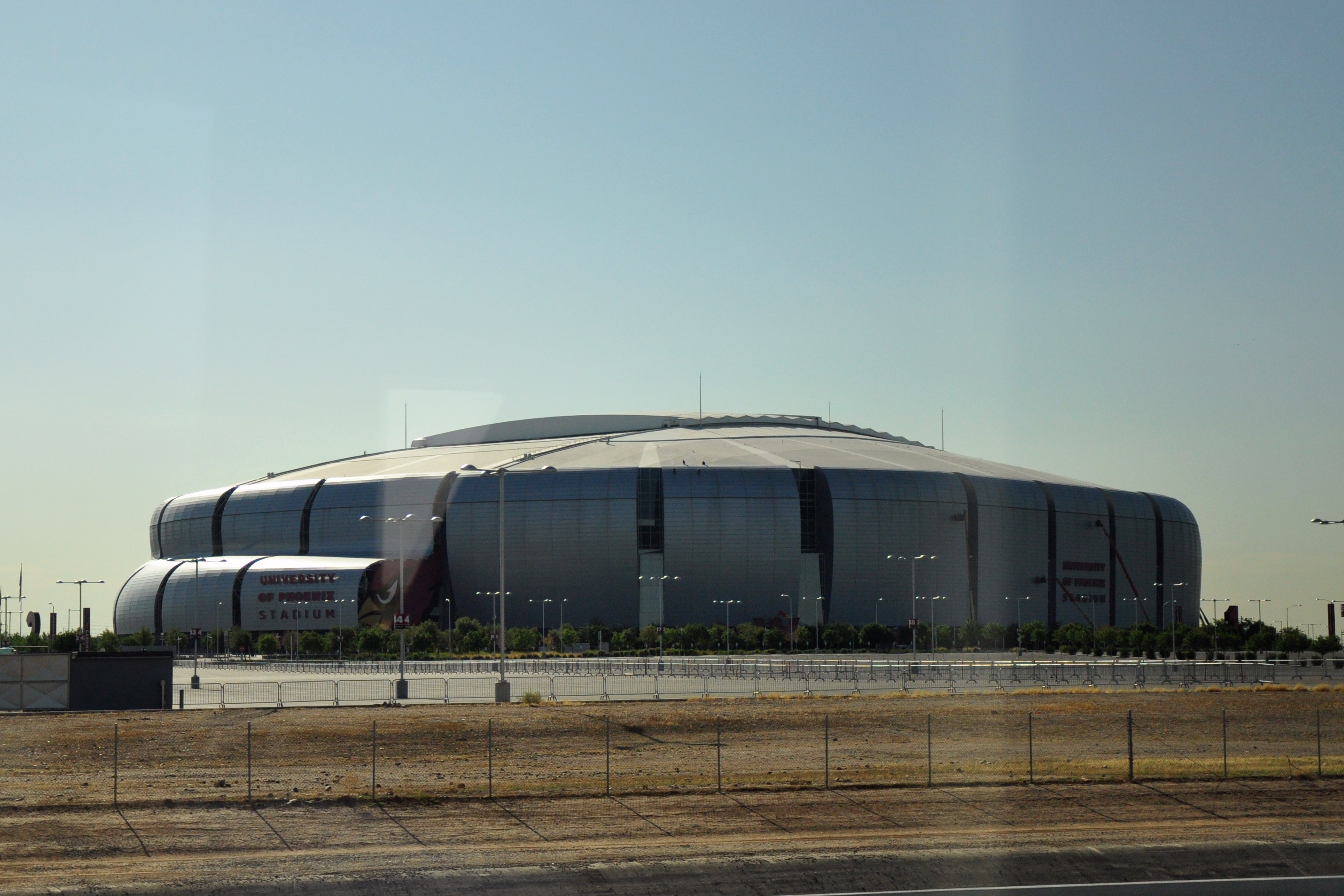
University of Phoenix Stadium in Glendale, Arizona, hosted the College Football Playoff National Championship.

The 2015–16 College Football Playoff was a single-elimination postseason tournament that determined the national champion of the 2015 NCAA Division I FBS football season. It was the second edition of the College Football Playoff (CFP) and involved the top four teams in the country as ranked by the College Football Playoff poll playing in two semifinals, with the winners of each advancing to the national championship game. Each participating team was the champion of its respective conference: No. 1 Clemson from the Atlantic Coast Conference, No. 2 Alabama from the Southeastern Conference, No. 3 Michigan State from the Big Ten Conference, and No. 4 Oklahoma from the Big 12 Conference.

The playoff bracket's semifinal games were held at the Orange Bowl and Cotton Bowl Classic on New Year's Eve, part of the season's slate of bowl games. In the Orange Bowl semifinal, Clemson defeated Oklahoma by twenty points. The second semifinal, at the Cotton Bowl, saw Alabama shutout Michigan State, 38–0. As a result of their victories, Clemson and Alabama faced each other in the national championship game, held on January 11 in Glendale, Arizona. In that game, Alabama won by five points, giving them their first CFP national championship and their sixteenth claimed national championship in school history.

The playoff set streaming viewership records for the CFP, with both semifinals besting those of the previous year and the championship doing the same. Despite an overall viewership drop of 23 percent from the 2015 championship, this year's championship set a record for unique viewers for an ESPN college football broadcast and ranked third among broadcasts of all sports in that category. The championship game received a Nielsen rating of 15.8.

== Bracket ==
Semifinals
December 31 – Orange Bowl; Sun Life Stadium, Miami Gardens
1	Clemson	37
4	Oklahoma	17
December 31 – Cotton Bowl; AT&T Stadium, Arlington
2	Alabama	38
3	Michigan State	0

Championship
January 11 – National Championship; University of Phoenix Stadium, Glendale
1	Clemson	40
2	Alabama	45

== Selection and teams ==
The 2015–16 CFP selection committee was chaired by Arkansas athletic director Jeff Long. Its other members were Wisconsin athletic director Barry Alvarez, former United States Air Force Academy superintendent Michael C. Gould, Texas Tech athletic director Kirby Hocutt, former NCAA executive vice president Tom Jernstedt, former head coach Bobby Johnson, former Nebraska head coach Tom Osborne, Clemson athletic director Dan Radakovich, former United States secretary of state Condoleezza Rice, former Big East Conference commissioner Mike Tranghese, former USA Today reporter Steve Wieberg, and former college head coach Tyrone Willingham.

The season's first College Football Playoff rankings were released on November 3, 2015. Clemson, from the Atlantic Coast Conference (ACC), was ranked No. 1. The Southeastern Conference (SEC) was represented by No. 2 LSU and No. 4 Alabama, while No. 3 Ohio State represented the Big Ten Conference. Notre Dame, an FBS independent, and Baylor, from the Big 12 Conference, rounded out the top six. Alabama rose to No. 2 the following week as a result of their win against LSU, who dropped to No. 9. The November 10 rankings also saw Notre Dame jump to No. 4 after beating Pittsburgh and Iowa rose to No. 6 following an eight-point win at Indiana. The top five teams kept their rankings through to week 11, though a loss by No. 6 Baylor to No. 12 Oklahoma saw them replaced in the top six by Oklahoma State. Several upsets shook up the following week's rankings: No. 9 Michigan State defeated No. 3 Ohio State and No. 10 Baylor defeated No. 6 Oklahoma State. As a result, Michigan State jumped to No. 5 and Baylor rose to No. 7. Further, Oklahoma leapfrogged to No. 3 following a win over No. 18 TCU and Iowa rose one spot to No. 4 after a win against Purdue that saw the Hawkeyes clinch the Big Ten West Division. The final week of the regular season saw only one change made to the top six, as No. 9 Stanford's win over No. 6 Notre Dame and No. 8 Ohio State's win over No. 10 Michigan were sufficient for the Buckeyes to replace the Fighting Irish in the No. 6 spot in the December 1 rankings.

The following weekend saw many conferences play their championship games. No. 1 Clemson won the ACC Championship over No. 10 North Carolina to remain undefeated, leading Sports Illustrated to declare them the "clear No. 1" entering the CFP. In Atlanta, No. 2 Alabama defeated No. 18 Florida for the SEC Championship, putting them at 12–1 and likely contenders for the playoff as well. The Big Ten Championship saw No. 5 Michigan State defeat No. 4 Iowa on a touchdown with 27 seconds remaining. In the Pac-12 Championship, No. 7 Stanford defeated No. 20 USC.

Ultimately, Clemson and Alabama were selected in the top two spots, while Michigan State rose to No. 3 and Big 12 champion Oklahoma was ranked No. 4 in the final CFP rankings. Clemson and Oklahoma were assigned to the Orange Bowl, while Alabama and Michigan State were scheduled to play in the Cotton Bowl Classic. Iowa and Stanford, ranked No. 5 and No. 6, respectively, were slated to face each other in the Rose Bowl.

2015 College Football Playoff rankings top six progression
No.	Week 9	Week 10	Week 11	Week 12	Week 13	Final
1	Clemson (8–0)	Clemson (9–0)	Clemson (10–0)	Clemson (11–0)	Clemson (12–0)	Clemson (13–0)
2	LSU (7–0)	Alabama (8–1)	Alabama (9–1)	Alabama (10–1)	Alabama (11–1)	Alabama (12–1)
3	Ohio State (8–0)	Ohio State (9–0)	Ohio State (10–0)	Oklahoma (10–1)	Oklahoma (11–1)	Michigan State (12–1)
4	Alabama (7–1)	Notre Dame (8–1)	Notre Dame (9–1)	Iowa (11–0)	Iowa (12–0)	Oklahoma (11–1)
5	Notre Dame (7–1)	Iowa (9–0)	Iowa (10–0)	Michigan State (10–1)	Michigan State (11–1)	Iowa (12–1)
6	Baylor (7–0)	Baylor (8–0)	Oklahoma State (10–0)	Notre Dame (10–1)	Ohio State (11–1)	Stanford (11–2)

Key: Team increased ranking from previous week Team decreased ranking from previous week Team selected to College Football Playoff

== Playoff games ==
=== Semifinals ===
==== Orange Bowl ====
2015 Orange Bowl

Quarter	1	2	3	4	Total
No. 4 Oklahoma	7	10	0	0	17
No. 1 Clemson	3	13	14	7	37

at Hard Rock Stadium • Miami Gardens, Florida

- Date: December 31, 2015
- Game time: 4:00 p.m. EST

A rematch of the Russell Athletic Bowl from the year before, the Orange Bowl semifinal was a matchup between No. 1 Clemson and No. 4 Oklahoma. It was their fifth all-time meeting. Each team scored once in the first quarter: Oklahoma capped their opening drive with a Samaje Perine touchdown rush, while Clemson's Greg Huegel kicked a field goal on the Tigers' second possession. Clemson took the lead with ten points from its next two possessions but a touchdown pass from Baker Mayfield to Mark Andrews late in the second quarter gave the Sooners a one-point halftime lead. In the second half, Oklahoma, who lost both Perine and Joe Mixon to injury, failed to score, and the Tigers added touchdowns by Wayne Gallman and Hunter Renfrow to recapture and keep the lead. Clemson quarterback Deshaun Watson, a finalist for the Heisman Trophy, was named MVP alongside linebacker Ben Boulware as the Tigers won by twenty to advance to the National Championship.

==== Cotton Bowl Classic ====
2015 Cotton Bowl Classic

Quarter	1	2	3	4	Total
No. 3 Michigan State	0	0	0	0	0
No. 2 Alabama	0	10	21	7	38

at AT&T Stadium • Arlington, Texas

- Date: December 31, 2015
- Game time: 7:20 p.m. CST

The Cotton Bowl Classic semifinal matchup paired No. 2 Alabama and No. 3 Michigan State in their first meeting since a Crimson Tide victory in the 2011 Capital One Bowl. The game started scoreless through the first quarter, and Alabama struck first with a touchdown by running back Derrick Henry near the midpoint of the second quarter. A field goal made the score 10–0 at halftime, but touchdowns from Calvin Ridley, Cyrus Jones, and Henry in the second half cemented a "blowout" win for the Crimson Tide, according to The Dothan Eagle. The win was the ninth in nine attempts for Alabama head coach Nick Saban against his former assistants and saw Derrick Henry, the Heisman Trophy winner, break the SEC single-season rushing touchdowns record of twenty-three early in the game. Alabama's 38–0 win was the first shutout in any Cotton Bowl Classic game since 1963.

=== Championship game ===
2016 College Football Playoff National Championship

Quarter	1	2	3	4	Total
No. 2 Alabama	7	7	7	24	45
No. 1 Clemson	14	0	10	16	40

at University of Phoenix Stadium • Glendale, Arizona

- Date: January 11, 2016
- Game time: 6:30 p.m. MST

In their first meeting since the beginning of the 2008 season, No. 1 Clemson and No. 2 Alabama met in the National Championship game to conclude the 2015 season. The Crimson Tide entered the contest as favorites by a seven-point margin. Alabama scored first on a 50-yard touchdown rush by Derrick Henry, and Clemson responded on their next drive with a pass from Deshaun Watson to Hunter Renfrow to tie the game. Clemson scored another touchdown before the end of the first quarter to lead 14–7 but another Henry score tied the game at 14 points apiece going into halftime. A field goal and a touchdown apiece to begin the second half made the score 24–24 early in the fourth quarter. Following the Adam Griffith field goal that tied the game, Alabama attempted and recovered an onside kick, allowing them to retain possession of the ball. The Associated Press called it "perhaps the boldest call of [Nick] Saban's career" and The Anniston Star said that "the call was gutsy" and "the execution was flawless". Alabama scored a touchdown two plays later on a pass to O. J. Howard and did not relinquish the lead for the rest of the game, despite a national championship-record 40 combined points in the fourth quarter.

== Aftermath ==
Alabama's win gave them their fourth national championship in the previous seven seasons, the second team in history to do so after Notre Dame from 1943 to 1949. The championship was the fifth for head coach Nick Saban and the sixteenth all-time for the Crimson Tide. Clemson's loss in the national championship broke their 17-game winning streak, the second-longest in ACC history, and an even longer streak of 51 wins when leading at the end of the third quarter.

The national championship game drew a viewership average of 25.7 million, a drop of 23 percent, with a Nielsen rating of 15.8. Still, the championship game set an ESPN college football record for unique viewers at over 2.4 million, and ranked third among all ESPN broadcasts behind two FIFA World Cup games. The Orange Bowl and Cotton Bowl ranked first and second among CFP semifinal streaming viewership, besting both of the previous year's semifinals, and the championship game topped that of 2015 in the same category.
