= 2015–16 NCAA football bowl games =

College football postseason game series

- Season: 2015
- Regular season: September 3, 2015 – December 12, 2015
- Number of bowls: 42 (Note: 41 FBS bowl games, including the College Football Playoff National Championship Game, and 1 FCS bowl game.)
- All-star games: 4
- Bowl games: December 19, 2015 – January 11, 2016
- National Championship: 2016 College Football Playoff; National Championship
- Location of Championship: University of Phoenix Stadium; Glendale, AZ
- Champions: Alabama Crimson Tide
- Bowl Challenge Cup winner: SEC
Bowl record by conference
Conference	Bowls	Record	Number of teams in final AP poll
SEC	11	9–2 (0.818)	5
Pac-12	10	6–4 (0.600)	3
Big Ten	10	5–5 (0.500)	6
ACC	10	4–6 (0.400)	3
Mountain West	8	4–4 (0.500)	0
American	8	2–6 (0.250)	2
Big 12	7	3–4 (0.429)	4
MAC	7	3–4 (0.429)	0
Conference USA	5	3–2 (0.600)	1
Sun Belt	4	2–2 (0.500)	0
Independents	2	0–2 (0.000)	1

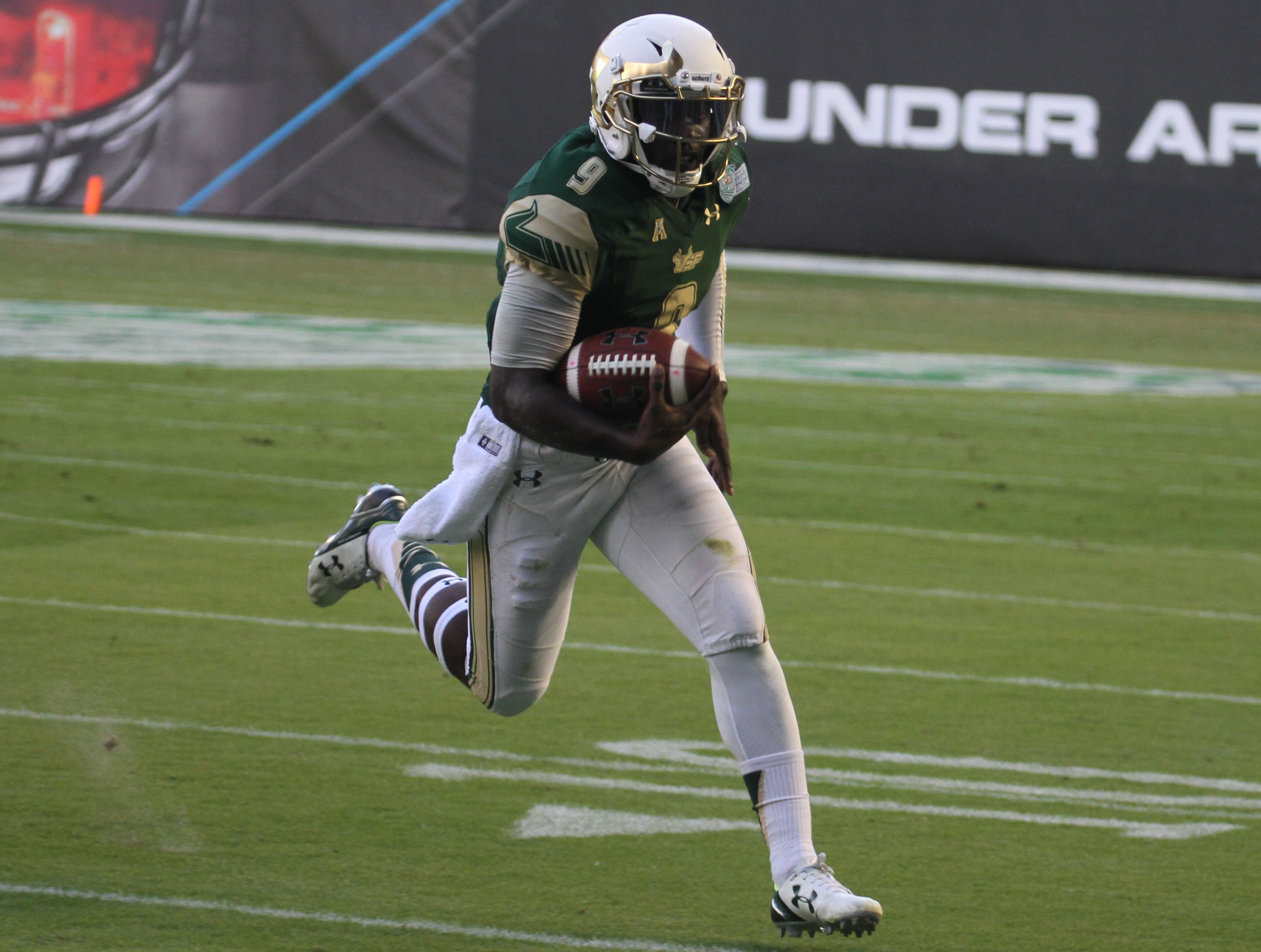
University of South Florida quarterback Quinton Flowers during the Miami Beach Bowl against WKU on December 21, 2015 at Marlins Park.

The 2015–16 NCAA football bowl games were a series of college football bowl games. They completed the 2015 NCAA Division I FBS football season. The games began on December 19, 2015, and, aside from the all-star games, ended with the 2016 College Football Playoff National Championship which was played on January 11, 2016.

A new record total of 41 team-competitive bowl games were played in FBS, including the national championship game and the inaugural Cure Bowl and Arizona Bowl. While bowl games had been the purview of only the very best teams for nearly a century, this was the tenth consecutive year that teams with non-winning seasons were bowl-eligible and participated in bowl games. To fill the 80 available team-competitive bowl slots, a new record 15 teams (19% of all participants) with non-winning seasons participated in bowl games—12 had a .500 (6–6) season and, for another new record, three had a sub-.500 season. Those three teams each had 5–7 seasons, sharing a new record for the most regular season losses by a bowl team, which had previously been six. This situation led directly to the NCAA Division I Council imposing a three-year moratorium on new bowl games in April 2016.

== Schedule ==
The schedule for the 2015–16 bowl games is below. All times are EST (UTC−5). The rankings used were the CFP rankings.

=== College Football Playoff and Championship Game ===
The 2015–16 postseason was the second to feature a College Football Playoff (CFP) to determine a national champion of Division I FBS college football. Four teams were selected by a 12-member committee to participate in a single-elimination tournament, whose semifinals were held at the Orange Bowl and the Cotton Bowl as part of a yearly rotation of six bowls. Their winners advanced to the 2016 College Football Playoff National Championship at University of Phoenix Stadium in Glendale, Arizona on January 11, 2016.

Both semifinal bowls were held on December 31, 2015. Under the TV contracts with ESPN that predate the CFP, both the Rose Bowl and the Sugar Bowl (the first two bowls in the three cycling pairs that host semi-final games) are guaranteed exclusive TV time slots on January 1, regardless of whether they will be hosting a semifinal game. Analysts expressed concerns that the semifinal games could face reduced television viewership due to the New Year's Eve scheduling, believing that fans would not be accustomed to the scheduling, and that they would face competition from New Year's Eve events and television specials like New Year's Rockin' Eve, which is aired by ABC—a corporate sibling to CFP broadcaster ESPN. ESPN then proposed moving the semifinal games to January 2, 2016, a Saturday, arguing that the games would enjoy a higher level of prominence if held on a day of the week that is traditionally associated with college football. However, its proposal was rejected.

CFP Executive Director Bill Hancock suggested this scheduling issue would instead "change the paradigm of what New Year's Eve is all about," opining that "if you're hosting a New Year's Eve party, you better have a bunch of televisions around." Ratings for the two semifinal games were down from the prior season's equivalents, with the Orange Bowl reaching a 9.7 rating (in comparison to 15.5 for the 2015 Rose Bowl) and the Cotton Bowl reaching a 9.9 rating (in comparison to a 15.3 rating for the 2015 Sugar Bowl). On the online WatchESPN streaming service, the Cotton Bowl and the Orange Bowl drew the second and third-largest streaming audiences in the service's history (excluding 2014 FIFA World Cup games), behind the 2015 College Football Playoff National Championship. As a result of the reduced viewership, it was reported that ESPN was negotiating $20 million worth of credits to advertisers to compensate for the lower than expected ratings.

Semifinals
December 31 – Orange Bowl; Sun Life Stadium, Miami Gardens
1	Clemson	37
4	Oklahoma	17
December 31 – Cotton Bowl; AT&T Stadium, Arlington
2	Alabama	38
3	Michigan State	0

Championship
January 11 – National Championship; University of Phoenix Stadium, Glendale
1	Clemson	40
2	Alabama	45

Date	Game	Site	Television	Teams	Affiliations	Results
Dec. 31	Peach Bowl	Georgia Dome; Atlanta, GA; 12:00 pm	ESPN	No. 18 Houston Cougars (12–1); No. 9 Florida State Seminoles (10–2)	American; ACC	Houston 38; Florida State 24
Dec. 31	Orange Bowl (Playoff Semifinal Game)	Sun Life Stadium; Miami Gardens, FL; 4:00 pm	ESPN	No. 1 Clemson Tigers (13–0); No. 4 Oklahoma Sooners (11–1)	ACC; Big 12	Clemson 37; Oklahoma 17
Dec. 31	Cotton Bowl Classic (Playoff Semifinal Game)	AT&T Stadium; Arlington, TX; 8:00 pm	ESPN	No. 2 Alabama Crimson Tide (12–1); No. 3 Michigan State Spartans (12–1)	SEC; Big Ten	Alabama 38; Michigan State 0
Jan. 1	Fiesta Bowl	University of Phoenix Stadium; Glendale, AZ; 1:00 pm	ESPN	No. 7 Ohio State Buckeyes (11–1); No. 8 Notre Dame Fighting Irish (10–2)	Big Ten; Independent	Ohio State 44; Notre Dame 28
Jan. 1	Rose Bowl Game	Rose Bowl; Pasadena, CA; 5:00 pm	ESPN	No. 6 Stanford Cardinal (11–2); No. 5 Iowa Hawkeyes (12–1)	Pac-12; Big Ten	Stanford 45; Iowa 16
Jan. 1	Sugar Bowl	Mercedes-Benz Superdome; New Orleans, LA; 8:30 pm	ESPN	No. 12 Ole Miss Rebels (9–3); No. 16 Oklahoma State Cowboys (10–2)	SEC; Big 12	Ole Miss 48; Oklahoma State 20
Jan. 11	College Football Playoff National Championship (Orange Bowl Winner vs. Cotton Bowl Winner)	University of Phoenix Stadium; Glendale, AZ; 8:30 pm	ESPN	No. 2 Alabama Crimson Tide (13–1); No. 1 Clemson Tigers (14–0)	SEC; ACC	Alabama 45; Clemson 40

=== Non-CFP bowl games ===
For the 2015–16 season, two new bowl games were added, the Cure Bowl and the Arizona Bowl, bringing the total number of bowl games to 41. Due to not having enough teams with a 6–6 or better record to fill available bowl slots, the increase in number of bowls had the adverse effect of allowing a record three teams with losing records (5–7) to participate in bowls. The teams were selected by being the ones with the highest Academic Progress Rate (APR) among all 5–7 teams. The participating teams with a losing record were Nebraska, Minnesota, and San Jose State.

Date	Game	Site	Television	Teams	Affiliations	Results
Dec. 19	New Mexico Bowl	University Stadium; Albuquerque, NM; 2:00 pm	ESPN	Arizona Wildcats (6–6); New Mexico Lobos (7–5)	Pac-12; Mountain West	Arizona 45; New Mexico 37
Dec. 19	Las Vegas Bowl	Sam Boyd Stadium; Whitney, NV; 3:30 pm	ABC	No. 22 Utah Utes (9–3); BYU Cougars (9–3)	Pac-12; Independent	Utah 35; BYU 28
Dec. 19	Camellia Bowl	Cramton Bowl; Montgomery, AL; 5:30 pm	ESPN	Appalachian State Mountaineers (10–2); Ohio Bobcats (8–4)	Sun Belt; MAC	Appalachian State 31; Ohio 29
Dec. 19	Cure Bowl	Orlando Citrus Bowl Stadium; Orlando, FL; 7:00 pm	CBSSN	San Jose State Spartans (5–7); Georgia State Panthers (6–6)	Mountain West; Sun Belt	San Jose State 27; Georgia State 16
Dec. 19	New Orleans Bowl	Mercedes-Benz Superdome; New Orleans, LA; 9:00 pm	ESPN	Louisiana Tech Bulldogs (8–4); Arkansas State Red Wolves (9–3)	C-USA; Sun Belt	Louisiana Tech 47; Arkansas State 28
Dec. 21	Miami Beach Bowl	Marlins Park; Miami, FL; 2:30 pm	ESPN	Western Kentucky Hilltoppers (11–2); South Florida Bulls (8–4)	C-USA; American	Western Kentucky 45; South Florida 35
Dec. 22	Famous Idaho Potato Bowl	Albertsons Stadium; Boise, ID; 3:30 pm	ESPN	Akron Zips (7–5); Utah State Aggies (6–6)	MAC; Mountain West	Akron 23; Utah State 21
Dec. 22	Boca Raton Bowl	FAU Stadium; Boca Raton, FL; 7:00 pm	ESPN	Toledo Rockets (9–2); No. 24 Temple Owls (10–3)	MAC; American	Toledo 32; Temple 17
Dec. 23	Poinsettia Bowl	Qualcomm Stadium; San Diego, CA; 4:30 pm	ESPN	Boise State Broncos (8–4); Northern Illinois Huskies (8–5)	Mountain West; MAC	Boise State 55; Northern Illinois 7
Dec. 23	GoDaddy Bowl	Ladd–Peebles Stadium; Mobile, AL; 8:00 pm	ESPN	Georgia Southern Eagles (8–4); Bowling Green Falcons (10–3)	Sun Belt; MAC	Georgia Southern 58; Bowling Green 27
Dec. 24	Bahamas Bowl	Thomas Robinson Stadium; Nassau, Bahamas; 12:00 pm	ESPN	Western Michigan Broncos (7–5); Middle Tennessee Blue Raiders (7–5)	MAC; C-USA	Western Michigan 45; Middle Tennessee 31
Dec. 24	Hawaiʻi Bowl	Aloha Stadium; Honolulu, HI; 8:00 pm	ESPN	San Diego State Aztecs (10–3); Cincinnati Bearcats (7–5)	Mountain West; American	San Diego State 42; Cincinnati 7
Dec. 26	St. Petersburg Bowl	Tropicana Field; St. Petersburg, FL; 11:00 am	ESPN	Marshall Thundering Herd (9–3); Connecticut Huskies (6–6)	C-USA; American	Marshall 16; Connecticut 10
Dec. 26	Sun Bowl	Sun Bowl Stadium; El Paso, TX; 2:00 pm	CBS	Washington State Cougars (8–4); Miami Hurricanes (8–4)	Pac-12; ACC	Washington State 20; Miami 14
Dec. 26	Heart of Dallas Bowl	Cotton Bowl; Dallas, TX; 2:20 pm	ESPN	Washington Huskies (6–6); Southern Miss Golden Eagles (9–4)	Pac-12; C-USA	Washington 44; Southern Miss 31
Dec. 26	Pinstripe Bowl	Yankee Stadium; Bronx, NY; 3:30 pm	ABC	Duke Blue Devils (7–5); Indiana Hoosiers (6–6)	ACC; Big Ten	Duke 44; Indiana 41 (OT)
Dec. 26	Independence Bowl	Independence Stadium; Shreveport, LA; 5:45 pm	ESPN	Virginia Tech Hokies (6–6); Tulsa Golden Hurricane (6–6)	ACC; American	Virginia Tech 55; Tulsa 52
Dec. 26	Foster Farms Bowl	Levi's Stadium; Santa Clara, CA; 9:15 pm	ESPN	Nebraska Cornhuskers (5–7); UCLA Bruins (8–4)	Big Ten; Pac-12	Nebraska 37; UCLA 29
Dec. 28	Military Bowl	Navy–Marine Corps Memorial Stadium; Annapolis, MD; 2:30 pm	ESPN	No. 21 Navy Midshipmen (10–2); Pittsburgh Panthers (8–4)	American; ACC	Navy 44; Pittsburgh 28
Dec. 28	Quick Lane Bowl	Ford Field; Detroit, MI; 5:00 pm	ESPN2	Minnesota Golden Gophers (5–7); Central Michigan Chippewas (7–5)	Big Ten; MAC	Minnesota 21; Central Michigan 14
Dec. 29	Armed Forces Bowl	Amon G. Carter Stadium; Fort Worth, TX; 2:00 pm	ESPN	California Golden Bears (7–5); Air Force Falcons (8–5)	Pac-12; Mountain West	California 55; Air Force 36
Dec. 29	Russell Athletic Bowl	Orlando Citrus Bowl Stadium; Orlando, FL; 5:30 pm	ESPN	No. 17 Baylor Bears (9–3); No. 10 North Carolina Tar Heels (11–2)	Big 12; ACC	Baylor 49; North Carolina 38
Dec. 29	Arizona Bowl	Arizona Stadium; Tucson, AZ; 7:30 pm	ASN	Nevada Wolf Pack (6–6); Colorado State Rams (7–5)	Mountain West; Mountain West	Nevada 28; Colorado State 23
Dec. 29	Texas Bowl	NRG Stadium; Houston, TX; 9:00 pm	ESPN	No. 20 LSU Tigers (8–3); Texas Tech Red Raiders (7–5)	SEC; Big 12	LSU 56; Texas Tech 27
Dec. 30	Birmingham Bowl	Legion Field; Birmingham, AL; 12:00 pm	ESPN	Auburn Tigers (6–6); Memphis Tigers (9–3)	SEC; American	Auburn 31; Memphis 10
Dec. 30	Belk Bowl	Bank of America Stadium; Charlotte, NC; 3:30 pm	ESPN	Mississippi State Bulldogs (8–4); NC State Wolfpack (7–5)	SEC; ACC	Mississippi State 51; NC State 28
Dec. 30	Music City Bowl	Nissan Stadium; Nashville, TN; 7:00 pm	ESPN	Louisville Cardinals (7–5); Texas A&M Aggies (8–4)	ACC; SEC	Louisville 27; Texas A&M 21
Dec. 30	Holiday Bowl	Qualcomm Stadium; San Diego, CA; 10:30 pm	ESPN	Wisconsin Badgers (9–3); No. 25 USC Trojans (8–5)	Big Ten; Pac-12	Wisconsin 23; USC 21
Jan. 1	Outback Bowl	Raymond James Stadium; Tampa, FL; 12:00 pm	ESPN2	No. 23 Tennessee Volunteers (8–4); No. 13 Northwestern Wildcats (10–2)	SEC; Big Ten	Tennessee 45; Northwestern 6
Jan. 1	Citrus Bowl	Orlando Citrus Bowl Stadium; Orlando, FL; 1:00 pm	ABC	No. 14 Michigan Wolverines (9–3); No. 19 Florida Gators (10–3)	Big Ten; SEC	Michigan 41; Florida 7
Jan. 2	TaxSlayer Bowl	EverBank Field; Jacksonville, FL; 12:00 pm	ESPN	Georgia Bulldogs (9–3); Penn State Nittany Lions (7–5)	SEC; Big Ten	Georgia 24; Penn State 17
Jan. 2	Liberty Bowl	Liberty Bowl Memorial Stadium; Memphis, TN; 3:20 pm	ESPN	Arkansas Razorbacks (7–5); Kansas State Wildcats (6–6)	SEC; Big 12	Arkansas 45; Kansas State 23
Jan. 2	Alamo Bowl	Alamodome; San Antonio, TX; 6:45 pm	ESPN	No. 11 TCU Horned Frogs (10–2); No. 15 Oregon Ducks (9–3)	Big 12; Pac-12	TCU 47; Oregon 41 (3OT)
Jan. 2	Cactus Bowl	Chase Field; Phoenix, AZ; 10:15 pm	ESPN	West Virginia Mountaineers (7–5); Arizona State Sun Devils (6–6)	Big 12; Pac-12	West Virginia 43; Arizona State 42

+ Notre Dame is eligible for any one of the bowl bids reserved for ACC teams, if Notre Dame: (a) is bowl-eligible; and (b) is not selected for one of the CFP Bowls. Notre Dame may not be selected for one of the bowl games having ACC tie-ins unless Notre Dame has no less than one less overall loss than the winningest-remaining ACC team which has not yet been selected for a bowl game.

BYU has an agreement with the Royal Purple Las Vegas Bowl and the Hawaiʻi Bowl for the 2015 and 2016 seasons. The Cougars will appear, in place of a Mountain West team, in the Las Vegas Bowl this season.

=== All-star games ===
Date	Game	Site	Television	Participants	Results
Jan. 17	Tropic Bowl	North Miami Stadium; North Miami Beach, Florida		American Team; National Team	American 38; National 14
Jan. 23	East–West Shrine Game	Tropicana Field; St. Petersburg, FL; 4:00 pm	NFL Network	East Team; West Team	West 29; East 9
Jan. 23	NFLPA Collegiate Bowl	StubHub Center; Carson, CA; 6:00 pm	ESPN2	National Team; American Team	National 18; American 17
Jan. 30	Senior Bowl	Ladd–Peebles Stadium; Mobile, AL; 2:30 pm	NFL Network	North Team; South Team	South 27; North 16

=== FCS bowl game ===
The FCS has one bowl game; they also have a championship bracket that began on November 28 and ended on January 9.

Date	Game	Site	Television	Participants	Affiliations	Results
Dec. 19	Celebration Bowl	Georgia Dome; Atlanta, Georgia; 12:00 pm	ABC	North Carolina A&T Aggies (9–2); Alcorn State Braves (9–3)	MEAC; SWAC	North Carolina A&T 41; Alcorn State 34

=== Results ===
The Southeastern Conference was the Bowl Challenge Cup winner for the 2015-16 bowl season, which is awarded to the FBS football conference with the highest winning percentage. In addition, the nine total bowl wins by the SEC were the most ever accomplished by a single conference during a single bowl season. Southeastern Conference member Alabama won the 2016 College Football Playoff National Championship game to finish the year as consensus national champions for the 2015 football season.

== Selection of the teams ==
=== CFP top 25 teams ===
On December 6, 2015, the College Football Playoff selection committee announced their final team rankings for the year:

Rank	Team	W–L	Conference and standing	Bowl game
1	Clemson Tigers	13–0	ACC champions	Orange Bowl (CFP semifinal)
2	Alabama Crimson Tide	12–1	SEC champions	Cotton Bowl Classic (CFP semifinal)
3	Michigan State Spartans	12–1	Big Ten champions	Cotton Bowl Classic (CFP semifinal)
4	Oklahoma Sooners	11–1	Big 12 champions	Orange Bowl (CFP semifinal)
5	Iowa Hawkeyes	12–1	Big Ten West Division champions	Rose Bowl (NY6)
6	Stanford Cardinal	11–2	Pac-12 champions	Rose Bowl (NY6)
7	Ohio State Buckeyes	11–1	Big Ten East Division co-champions	Fiesta Bowl (NY6)
8	Notre Dame Fighting Irish	10–2	Independent	Fiesta Bowl (NY6)
9	Florida State Seminoles	10–2	ACC Atlantic Division second place	Peach Bowl (NY6)
10	North Carolina Tar Heels	11–2	ACC Coastal Division champions	Russell Athletic Bowl
11	TCU Horned Frogs	10–2	Big 12 second place (tie)	Alamo Bowl
12	Ole Miss Rebels	9–3	SEC West Division second place	Sugar Bowl (NY6)
13	Northwestern Wildcats	10–2	Big Ten West Division second place (tie)	Outback Bowl
14	Michigan Wolverines	9–3	Big Ten East Division third place	Citrus Bowl
15	Oregon Ducks	9–3	Pac-12 North Division second place	Alamo Bowl
16	Oklahoma State Cowboys	10–2	Big 12 second place (tie)	Sugar Bowl (NY6)
17	Baylor Bears	9–3	Big Twelve fourth place	Russell Athletic Bowl
18	Houston Cougars	12–1	American champions	Peach Bowl (NY6)
19	Florida Gators	10–3	SEC East Division champions	Citrus Bowl
20	LSU Tigers	8–3	SEC West Division third place (tie)	Texas Bowl
21	Navy Midshipmen	10–2	American West Division co-champions	Military Bowl
22	Utah Utes	9–3	Pac-12 South Division co-champions	Las Vegas Bowl
23	Tennessee Volunteers	8–4	SEC East Division second place (tie)	Outback Bowl
24	Temple Owls	10–2	American East Division champions	Boca Raton Bowl
25	USC Trojans	8–5	Pac-12 South Division co-champions	Holiday Bowl

=== Conference champions' bowl games ===
The Cotton Bowl Classic and Orange Bowl featured two conference champions playing against each other. Rankings are per the above CFP standings.

Conference	Champion	W–L	Rank	Bowl game
ACC	Clemson Tigers	13–0	1	Orange Bowl
American	Houston Cougars	12–1	18	Peach Bowl
Big Ten	Michigan State Spartans	12–1	3	Cotton Bowl Classic
Big 12	Oklahoma Sooners	11–1	4	Orange Bowl
C-USA	Western Kentucky Hilltoppers	11–2	—	Miami Beach Bowl
MAC	Bowling Green Falcons	10–3	—	GoDaddy Bowl
Mountain West	San Diego State Aztecs	10–3	—	Hawaii Bowl
Pac-12	Stanford Cardinal	11–2	6	Rose Bowl
SEC	Alabama Crimson Tide	12–1	2	Cotton Bowl Classic
Sun Belt	Arkansas State Red Wolves	9–3	—	New Orleans Bowl

=== Bowl-eligible teams ===
- ACC (9): Clemson, Duke, Florida State, Louisville, Miami, North Carolina, NC State, Pittsburgh, Virginia Tech
- The American (8): Cincinnati, Connecticut, Houston, Memphis, Navy, South Florida, Temple, Tulsa
- Big Ten (8): Indiana, Iowa, Michigan, Michigan State, Northwestern, Ohio State, Penn State, Wisconsin
- Big 12 (7): Baylor, Kansas State, Oklahoma, Oklahoma State, TCU, Texas Tech, West Virginia
- Conference USA (5): Louisiana Tech, Marshall, Middle Tennessee, Southern Miss, Western Kentucky
- Independents (2): BYU, Notre Dame
- MAC (7): Akron, Bowling Green, Central Michigan, Northern Illinois, Ohio, Toledo, Western Michigan
- Mountain West (7): Air Force, Boise State, Colorado State, Nevada, New Mexico, San Diego State, Utah State
- Pac-12 (10): Arizona, Arizona State, California, Oregon, Stanford, UCLA, USC, Utah, Washington, Washington State
- SEC (10): Alabama, Arkansas, Auburn, Florida, Georgia, LSU, Mississippi State, Ole Miss, Tennessee, Texas A&M
- Sun Belt (4): Appalachian State, Arkansas State, Georgia Southern, Georgia State

Number of bowl berths available: 80
Number of bowl-eligible teams: 77

=== Conditionally bowl-ineligible teams ===
- The American (4): East Carolina*, SMU, Tulane, UCF
- ACC (5): Boston College, Georgia Tech, Syracuse, Virginia, Wake Forest
- Big Ten (6): Illinois*, Maryland, Minnesota*, Nebraska*, Purdue, Rutgers
- Big 12 (3): Iowa State, Kansas, Texas*
- Conference USA (8): Charlotte, Florida Atlantic, FIU*, North Texas, Old Dominion*, Rice*, UTSA, UTEP*
- Independent (1): Army
- MAC (6): Ball State, Buffalo*, Eastern Michigan, Kent State, Miami (OH), UMass
- Mountain West (5): Fresno State, Hawaii, San Jose State*, UNLV, Wyoming
- Pac-12 (2): Colorado, Oregon State
- SEC (4): Kentucky*, Missouri*, South Carolina, Vanderbilt
- Sun Belt (7): Idaho, Louisiana–Lafayette, Louisiana-Monroe, New Mexico State, South Alabama*, Texas State, Troy

Number of bowl-ineligible teams: 51

Note: Being bowl-ineligible does not, in itself, exclude a team from the chance to play in a bowl game. Tiebreaker procedures based on a school's Academic Progress Rate (APR) allowed for the possibility of 5–7 teams to play in bowl games since not enough teams qualified to fill all 80 spots with at least a 6–6 record.

Note: Teams with Asterisk (*) have a 5–7 record (14 total). Since a maximum of 77 bowl slots were filled, 3 of these teams qualified for a bowl game. These teams were Nebraska, Minnesota, and San Jose State. Missouri would have qualified over Minnesota or San Jose State, but announced they would decline a bowl bid.

Note: There are 128 teams in FBS.

== See also ==
- Celebration Bowl, a game between two FCS teams that played its inaugural game in 2015
- Amos Alonzo Stagg Bowl, the championship game for Division III football that ended the 2015 NCAA Division III football season
