= 2015 Russell Athletic Bowl =

American college football game

- 26th Russell Athletic Bowl
North Carolina Tar Heels	Baylor Bears
(11–2)	(9–3)
ACC	Big 12
38	49
Head coach: Larry Fedora	Head coach: Art Briles
AP / Coaches / CFP; 10 / 11 / 10	AP / Coaches / CFP; 18 / 19 / 17
	1	2	3	4	Total
North Carolina	7	10	14	7	38
Baylor	14	14	14	7	49
- Date: December 29, 2015
- Season: 2015
- Stadium: Orlando Citrus Bowl
- Location: Orlando, Florida
- Favorite: Baylor by 3
- Referee: John O'Neill (Big Ten)
- Attendance: 40,418
- Payout: US$TBD

United States TV coverage
- Network: ESPN/ESPN Radio
- Announcers: Mike Patrick, Ed Cunningham, & Dr. Jerry Punch (ESPN); Bill Rosinski, David Norrie, & Joe Schad (ESPN Radio)

The 2015 Russell Athletic Bowl was a post-season American college football bowl game played on December 29, 2015, at the Orlando Citrus Bowl in Orlando, Florida. The 26th edition of the Russell Athletic Bowl featured the North Carolina Tar Heels of the Atlantic Coast Conference against the Baylor Bears of the Big 12 Conference. It began at 5:30 p.m. EST and aired on ESPN. It was one of the 2015–16 bowl games that concluded the 2015 FBS football season. The game's naming rights sponsor was the Russell Athletic uniform company.

== Teams ==
The game featured the North Carolina Tar Heels against the Baylor Bears.

=== North Carolina Tar Heels ===
After finishing their season 11–2, the Tar Heels accepted their invitation to play in the game.

This was the Tar Heels' second Russell Athletic Bowl; they had previously won the 1995 Carquest Bowl, defeating Arkansas by a score of 20–10.

=== Baylor Bears ===
After finishing their season 9–3, the Bears accepted their invitation to play in the game.

== Game summary ==
The Bears set an all-time bowl game record with 645 total rushing yards.

=== Scoring summary ===
Scoring summary

Quarter	Time	Drive			Team	Scoring information	Score	
Quarter	Time	Plays	Yards	TOP	Team	Scoring information	UNC	BU
1	8:37	13	69	3:11	UNC	Brandon Fritts 9-yard touchdown reception from Marquise Williams, Nick Weiler kick good	7	0
1	4:25	13	75	4:12	BU	Lynx Hawthorne 6-yard touchdown run, Chris Callahan kick good	7	7
1	0:15	6	83	1:53	BU	Devin Chafin 2-yard touchdown run, Chris Callahan kick good	7	14
2	12:28	9	26	2:47	UNC	32-yard field goal by Nick Weiler	10	14
2	9:35	8	75	2:53	BU	Johnny Jefferson 11-yard touchdown run, Chris Callahan kick good	10	21
2	2:16	10	67	3:55	BU	Johnny Jefferson 27-yard touchdown run, Chris Callahan kick good	10	28
2	0:35	10	75	1:41	UNC	Marquise Williams 4-yard touchdown run, Nick Weiler kick good	17	28
3	11:45	9	75	3:15	UNC	Marquise Williams 1-yard touchdown run, Nick Weiler kick good	24	28
3	3:07	8	61	3:21	BU	Terence Williams 3-yard touchdown run, Chris Callahan kick good	24	35
3	2:04	1	80	0:14	BU	Johnny Jefferson 80-yard touchdown run, Chris Callahan kick good	24	42
3	0:47	6	75	1:17	UNC	Bug Howard 27-yard touchdown reception from Marquise Williams, Nick Weiler kick good	31	42
4	10:24	13	75	5:23	BU	Terence Williams 1-yard touchdown run, Chris Callahan kick good	31	49
4	2:20	5	64	0:57	UNC	Kendrick Singleton 7-yard touchdown reception from Marquise Williams, Nick Weiler kick good	38	49
"TOP" = time of possession. For other American football terms, see Glossary of American football.							38	49

=== Statistics ===
Statistics	UNC	BU
First downs	28	38
Total offense, plays – yards	73–487	103–756
Rushes-yards (net)	36–244	84–645
Passing yards (net)	243	111
Passes, Comp-Att-Int	22–36–1	10–18–1
Time of Possession	22:54	37:06
