= 2016 Sugar Bowl =

2016 Allstate Sugar Bowl
- CFP New Year’s Six; 82nd Sugar Bowl
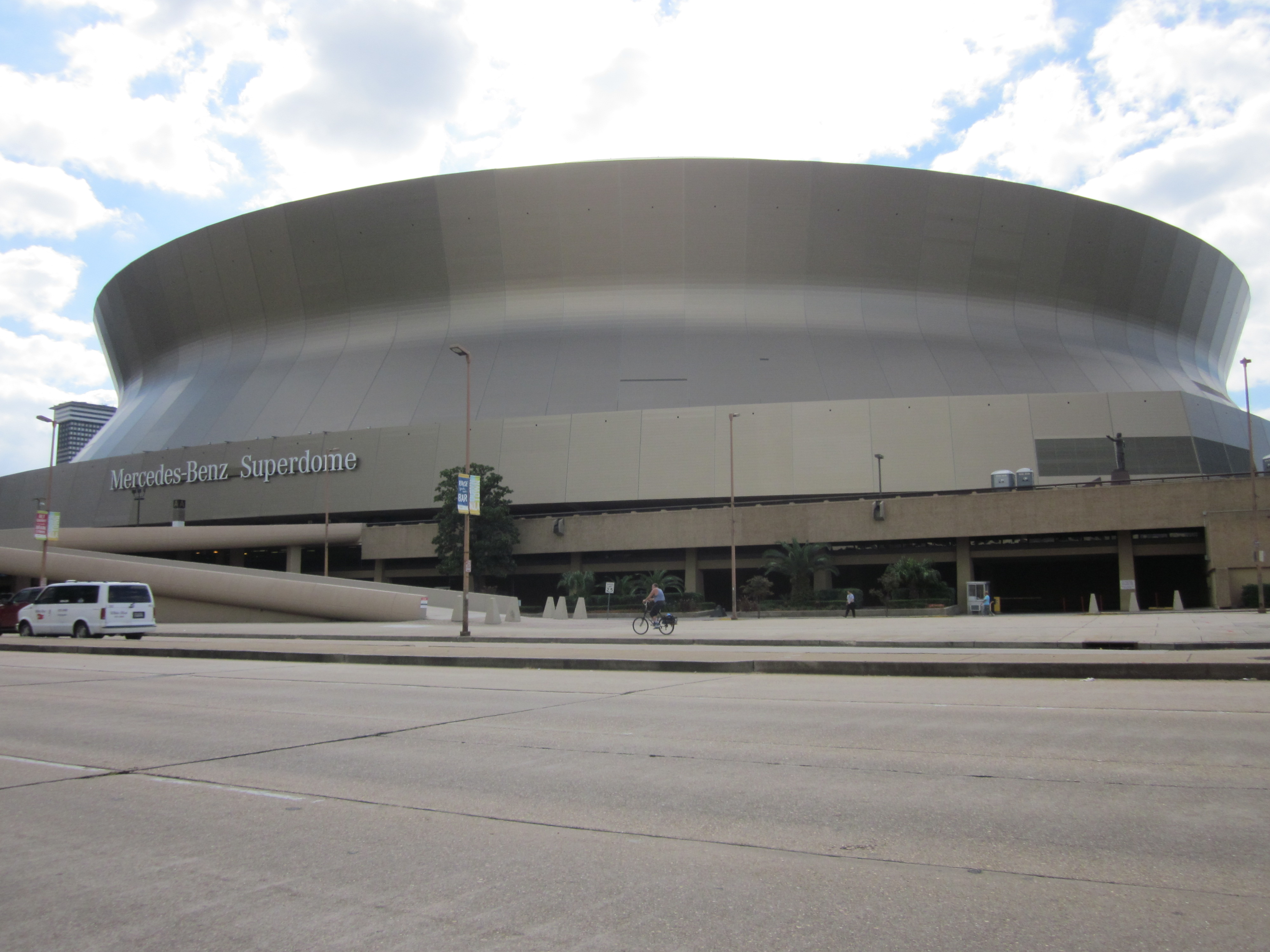
- The Mercedes-Benz Superdome in New Orleans, Louisiana, hosted the Sugar Bowl.
Oklahoma State Cowboys	Ole Miss Rebels
(10–2)	(9–3)
Big 12	SEC
20	48
Head coach: Mike Gundy	Head coach: Hugh Freeze
AP / Coaches / CFP; 13 / 13 / 16	AP / Coaches / CFP; 16 / 16 / 12
	1	2	3	4	Total
Oklahoma State	3	3	7	7	20
Ole Miss	10	24	7	7	48
- Date: January 1, 2016
- Season: 2015
- Stadium: Mercedes-Benz Superdome
- Location: New Orleans, Louisiana
- MVP: Chad Kelly (QB - Ole Miss)
- Favorite: Ole Miss by 7½
- National anthem: The Victory Belles
- Referee: Jeff Flanagan (ACC)
- Halftime show: Bands from participants
- Attendance: 72,117

United States TV coverage
- Network: ESPN, ESPN Deportes
- Announcers: Bob Wischusen (play-by-play), Brock Huard (Color Commentator), Shannon Spake (Sideline Reporter)- ESPN; Bill Rosinski, David Norrie, & Joe Schad (ESPN Radio)
- Nielsen ratings: 5.1 (8.9 million viewers)

The 2016 Sugar Bowl is a bowl game that was played on January 1, 2016, at the Mercedes-Benz Superdome in New Orleans, Louisiana. This 82nd Sugar Bowl was played between the University of Mississippi and Oklahoma State University. It is one of the 2015–16 bowl games that concluded the 2015 FBS football season. Sponsored by the Allstate insurance company, the game is officially known as the Allstate Sugar Bowl.

The contest was televised on ESPN and ESPN Deportes, with a radio broadcast on ESPN Radio and XM Satellite Radio. Kickoff time was set for 8:30 p.m. EST.

In the game, Ole Miss won by a score of 48–20 to get their first 10–win season since 2003, and only their second since the Vaught era. Both teams finished their respective seasons with 10–3 records.

== Teams ==
This was Oklahoma State's first Sugar Bowl since 1946, and Ole Miss's first since 1970. It was the third meeting between the two schools, having contested the Cotton Bowl Classic in 2004 and 2010. Ole Miss won all three games.

=== Oklahoma State ===
Oklahoma State began the season winning their first 10 games, which included a win over then–no. 5 TCU. Following the 10–0 start, the Cowboys had a #4 ranking in the College Football Playoff poll and controlled its own destiny in the Big 12. However, the Cowboys' undefeated season came to end when then–no. 10 Baylor beat them in Stillwater. The Cowboys would then lose another game at home in blowout fashion to rival and eventual Big 12 champion and College Football Playoff participant, Oklahoma. The Cowboys then fell to #16 in the CFP poll entering the Sugar Bowl, their first New Year's Six bowl game. The day before bowl selections and the CFP field were announced, Baylor was in line to be the Big 12's representative in the Sugar Bowl as had they won they would’ve also won the 3-way tiebreaker between themselves, Oklahoma State, and TCU. Instead, Texas defeated the Bears 23–17 in an upset in Waco, and Oklahoma State was selected for the Sugar Bowl by virtue of beating TCU a month before as Baylor had fallen to 9–3 (6–3 Big 12).

=== Ole Miss ===
Ole Miss began the season by handily defeating their first two opponents, scoring at least 73 points in each of the first two games before playing the then–second ranked Alabama on the road. In an upset, the Rebels beat the Crimson Tide and rose to #3 in the AP Poll. Just two weeks later, however, the Rebels would be blown out by then–no. 25 Florida. Following an easy win over New Mexico State, the Rebels traveled to Memphis, who they lost to in an upset. Ole Miss won their next two games against then–no. 15 Texas A&M and Auburn and performed well in the SEC West before suffering a defeat to Arkansas. Ole Miss ended the regular season with double digit wins over rivals LSU and Mississippi State and were ranked #12 coming into the game, which was their second consecutive New Year's Six bowl game.

== Game summary ==
=== Scoring summary ===
Scoring summary

Quarter	Time	Drive			Team	Scoring information	Score	
Quarter	Time	Plays	Yards	TOP	Team	Scoring information	OSU	MISS
1	4:52	7	29	3:01	OSU	26-yard field goal by Ben Grogan	3	0
1	2:15	7	57	2:31	MISS	34-yard field goal by Gary Wunderlich	3	3
1	0:20	3	58	0:39	MISS	Cody Core 31-yard touchdown reception from Chad Kelly, Gary Wunderlich kick good	3	10
2	11:28	6	51	2:01	MISS	Laquon Treadwell 34-yard touchdown reception from Chad Kelly, Gary Wunderlich kick good	3	17
2	6:58	5	85	1:36	MISS	Laquon Treadwell 10-yard touchdown reception from Chad Kelly, Gary Wunderlich kick good	3	24
2	3:39	8	55	2:04	MISS	38-yard field goal by Gary Wunderlich	3	27
2	1:22	10	61	2:17	OSU	31-yard field goal by Ben Grogan	6	27
2	0:00	8	74	1:22	MISS	Laremy Tunsil 2-yard touchdown run, Gary Wunderlich kick good	6	34
3	4:26	2	40	0:44	MISS	Jordan Wilkins 36-yard touchdown run, Gary Wunderlich kick good	6	41
3	1:11	9	75	3:15	OSU	J. W. Walsh 2-yard touchdown run, Ben Grogan kick good	13	41
4	13:04	8	71	3:00	MISS	Laquon Treadwell 14-yard touchdown reception from Chad Kelly, Gary Wunderlich kick good	13	48
4	3:03	5	54	2:25	OSU	J. W. Walsh 8-yard touchdown run, Ben Grogan kick good	20	48
"TOP" = time of possession. For other American football terms, see Glossary of American football.							20	48

=== Statistics ===
Statistics	OSU	MISS
First downs	20	28
Total offense, plays – yards	75–366	72–554
Rushes-yards (net)	30–63	37–207
Passing yards (net)	303	347
Passes, Comp-Att-Int	27–45–0	22–35–1
Time of Possession	31:53	28:07
