= Samaje Perine =

American football player (born 1995)

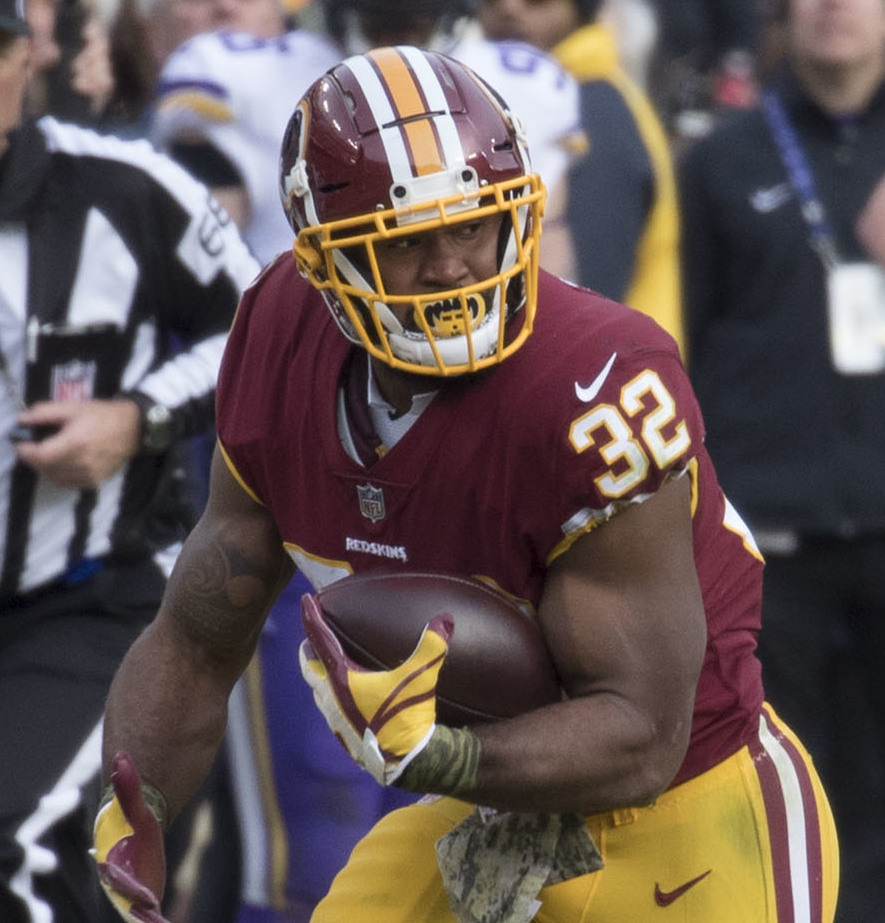
- Perine with the Washington Redskins in 2017

No. 34 – Cincinnati Bengals
- Position: Running back
- Roster status: Active

Personal information
- Born: September 16, 1995 (age 31); Jackson, Alabama, U.S.
- Listed height: 5 ft 11 in (1.80 m)
- Listed weight: 240 lb (109 kg)

Career information
- High school: Hendrickson (Pflugerville, Texas)
- College: Oklahoma (2014–2016)
- NFL draft: 2017: 4th round, 114th overall pick

Career history
- Washington Redskins (2017–2018); Cincinnati Bengals (2019); Miami Dolphins (2019); Cincinnati Bengals (2020–2022); Denver Broncos (2023); Kansas City Chiefs (2024); Cincinnati Bengals (2025–present)

Awards and highlights
- Big 12 Offensive Freshman of the Year (2014); Second-team All-American (2014); 2× First-team All-Big 12 (2014, 2015); Second-team All-Big 12 (2016); NCAA record: Most rushing yards in an NCAA football game: 427

Career NFL statistics as of 2025
- Rushing yards: 2,304
- Rushing average: 4.1
- Rushing touchdowns: 12
- Receptions: 196
- Receiving yards: 1,600
- Receiving touchdowns: 7
- Stats at Pro Football Reference

Samaje Perine (/səˈmɑːdʒeɪ ˈpiːraɪn/ sə-MAH-jay PEE-ryne; born September 16, 1995) is an American professional football running back for the Cincinnati Bengals of the National Football League (NFL). He played college football for the Oklahoma Sooners, and was selected by the Washington Redskins in the fourth round of the 2017 NFL draft. He has also played for the Miami Dolphins, Denver Broncos, and Kansas City Chiefs.

Perine currently holds the NCAA FBS record for most rushing yards in a single game, which he set as a true freshman in 2014 by rushing for 427 yards against Kansas.

== Early life ==
Perine was born and raised in Jackson, Alabama, but later moved with his family to Pflugerville, Texas, where he attended Hendrickson High School as a member of their football and track and field teams. He was a three-year starter at running back for the Hendrickson Hawks football team. He rushed for 1,993 yards and 16 touchdowns as a junior. In his final year, he rushed for 1,492 yards and 12 touchdowns.

In track & field, Perine competed in sprints and jumps. At the 2011 Manor Relay, he earned first-place finishes in both the triple jump (46 ft, 0.5 in) and long jump (20 ft, 8 in) events, while also anchoring the 4 × 100 and 4 × 200 relay squads, helping lead them to victory. He recorded a personal-best time of 11.37 seconds in the 100-meter dash in 2011.

Perine was ranked as a four-star recruit and the No. 13 running back in the nation by Rivals.com. In March 2013, he committed to the University of Oklahoma to play college football. He also had offers from Alabama, Nebraska, TCU, and Tennessee.

== College career ==
Perine attended and played college football for the University of Oklahoma from 2014 to 2016.

=== 2014 season ===
Perine saw immediate playing time as a freshman at Oklahoma in 2014. In his first career game, he rushed for 77 yards on 13 carries with one touchdown in a victory over Louisiana Tech. In his fourth game, he rushed 242 yards on 34 carries with four touchdowns. He rushed for 200 yards a second time, gaining 213 on 25 carries along with three touchdowns against Texas Tech on November 15. Perine rushed for 427 yards on 34 rushes along with five touchdowns in a victory over Kansas, breaking the Football Bowl Subdivision single game rushing record set by Wisconsin's Melvin Gordon just a week earlier. He finished his freshman season with 1,713 rushing yards on 263 carries with 21 touchdowns.

=== 2015 season ===
Perine started the 2015 season with 33 rushing yards and a rushing touchdown in a victory over the Akron Zips. In the next game, a double overtime win over the #23 Tennessee Volunteers at Neyland Stadium, he had 78 rushing yards and a receiving touchdown. In the following game against Tulsa, Perine had 152 rushing yards and a rushing touchdown. On October 24, against Texas Tech, he had a season-high 201 rushing yards and four rushing touchdowns. Perine followed that performance up with 90 rushing yards and two rushing touchdowns against Kansas in the next game. On November 14, against Baylor, he had 166 rushing yards and two rushing touchdowns. Perine followed that performance up with 188 rushing yards and a rushing touchdown against TCU. In the annual rivalry game against Oklahoma State, he had 131 rushing yards and two rushing touchdowns. Oklahoma qualified for the College Football Playoff, and faced off against Clemson in the National Semifinals. In the 37–17 loss in the Orange Bowl, he had 58 rushing yards, one rushing touchdown, two receptions, and 23 receiving yards. Overall, in the 2015 season, Perine finished with 1,349 rushing yards, 16 rushing touchdowns, 15 receptions, 107 receiving yards, and one receiving touchdown.

=== 2016 season ===
On October 1, in a win over TCU, Perine had 214 rushing yards and two rushing touchdowns. On November 12, against Baylor, he had 100 rushing yards and two rushing touchdowns. In the following game at West Virginia, Perine had 160 rushing yards and two rushing touchdowns. On December 3, he had 239 rushing yards and a touchdown against Oklahoma State. He broke the school career rushing yard record on January 2, 2017, with 86 rushing yards and a touchdown against Auburn at the Allstate Sugar Bowl, passing Billy Sims with a total of 4,122 yards. Perine finished the 2016 season with 1,060 rushing yards, 12 rushing touchdowns, 10 receptions, 106 receiving yards, and one receiving touchdown. After the season, Perine decided to forgo his senior year and enter the 2017 NFL draft.

== Professional career ==
Pre-draft measurables
Height	Weight	Arm length	Hand span	Wingspan	40-yard dash	10-yard split	20-yard split	20-yard shuttle	Three-cone drill	Vertical jump	Broad jump	Bench press
5 ft 10 5/8 in (1.79 m)	233 lb (106 kg)	30 3/8 in (0.77 m)	10 in (0.25 m)	6 ft 2 1/4 in (1.89 m)	4.60 s	1.59 s	2.67 s	4.37 s	7.26 s	33.0 in (0.84 m)	9 ft 8 in (2.95 m)	30 reps
All values from NFL Combine

=== Washington Redskins ===
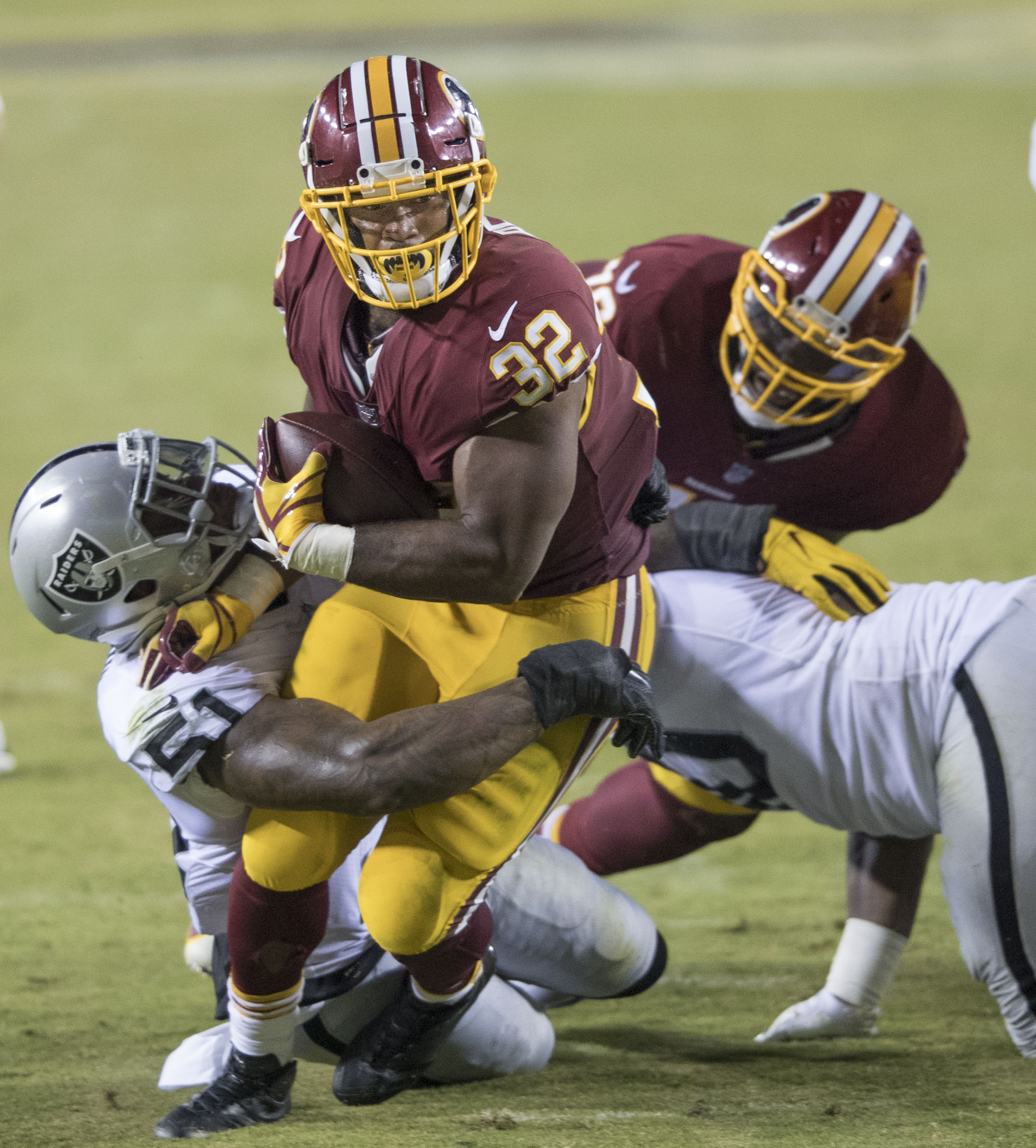
Perine playing against the Oakland Raiders in his rookie year.

The Washington Redskins selected Perine in the fourth round (114th overall) of the 2017 NFL Draft. He was the ninth running back selected in that year's draft. On May 11, 2017, Perine signed a four-year, $3.05 million contract with the team.

Perine joined a committee backfield of Chris Thompson, Robert Kelley, and Mack Brown. After the two starters combined for 34 yards in Week 1, Perine debuted September 17 against the Los Angeles Rams with 21 rushes for 67 yards. Despite being granted the majority of the team's rushes, he had fewer yards than either Thompson (78) or Kelley (77). In Week 3 against the Oakland Raiders, he again led the team in carries with 19 but for only 49 yards, and was moved back into a supporting role. Perine collected just 59 rushing yards total in Weeks 4–9, though he did pick up his first career touchdown on a three-yard reception from Kirk Cousins against San Francisco in Week 6.

After nine rushes for 35 yards and a 25-yard reception in Week 9, Perine moved back to starting following injuries to both Thompson and Kelley. He had success in Week 10 with 23 rushes for 117 yards, as well as his first career rushing touchdown against the New Orleans Saints, marking the first 100-yard rushing game for the Redskins of the season. He followed this up the following week with 24 rushes for 100 yards against the New York Giants, marking first Redskin with consecutive yard games of over 100 yards since Alfred Morris in 2013. Overall, he finished his rookie season with 603 rushing yards and one rushing touchdown to go along with 22 receptions for 182 yards and a receiving touchdown.

In a backfield where new arrival Adrian Peterson recorded most of the carries, Perine had eight carries for 32 yards in five games in the 2018 season. Perine was waived prior to the 2019 regular season on August 31.

=== Cincinnati Bengals (first stint) ===
On September 1, 2019, Perine was claimed off waivers by the Cincinnati Bengals. He was waived on October 17, but re-signed to the team's practice squad the following day.

=== Miami Dolphins ===
On December 24, 2019, Perine was signed by the Miami Dolphins off the Bengals practice squad. He was waived on April 26, 2020.

=== Cincinnati Bengals (second stint) ===
On April 28, 2020, Perine was claimed off waivers by the Bengals. In Week 8 of the 2020 season, against the Tennessee Titans, he scored his first touchdown since Week 11 of the 2017 season. In Week 16, against the Houston Texans, he had 13 carries for 95 rushing yards and two rushing touchdowns in the 37–31 victory. Perine finished the season with 63 rushes for 301 yards and three touchdowns, averaging 4.8 yards per carry. He re-signed on a two-year contract with the Bengals on March 24, 2021.

In the 2021 season, Perine had a backup role to former Oklahoma teammate Joe Mixon. He finished with 55 carries for 246 rushing yards and one rushing touchdown to go along with 27 receptions for 196 receiving yards and one receiving touchdown. In the AFC Championship against the Kansas City Chiefs, he had a 41-yard touchdown reception from Joe Burrow in the second quarter. The Bengals were down 21–3 at the time of the touchdown and it helped begin a comeback victory to advance to the Super Bowl. In Super Bowl LVI, Perine recorded two carries, each for no gain, in the 23–20 loss to the Los Angeles Rams.

The 2022 season followed with Perine continuing to back up Mixon, though after he sustained a concussion during the Week 11 game against the Pittsburgh Steelers, Perine would fill in as starter for the next two weeks. He finished with 394 rushing yards and two rushing touchdowns, and a career high 287 receiving yards and four receiving touchdowns.

=== Denver Broncos ===
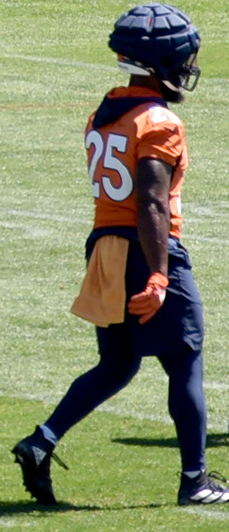
Perine with the Denver Broncos in 2023

On March 16, 2023, the Denver Broncos signed Perine to a two-year contract. In the 2023 season, Perine appeared in 17 games and started once. He finished with 53 carries for 238 rushing yards and one rushing touchdown to go with 50 receptions for 455 receiving yards. On August 27, 2024, the Broncos released Perine.

=== Kansas City Chiefs ===
On August 28, 2024, the Kansas City Chiefs signed Perine to a one-year, $1.5 million contract. In the 2024 season, Perine had 20 carries for 92 rushing yards and one rushing touchdown to go with 28 receptions for 322 receiving yards and one receiving touchdown. He played in Super Bowl LIX, recording one carry for eight yards in the 40–22 loss to the Philadelphia Eagles.

=== Cincinnati Bengals (third stint) ===
On March 13, 2025, Perine officially signed a two-year contract worth $3.8 million to return to the Cincinnati Bengals, his third stint with the franchise. In Week 8 against the New York Jets, Perine rushed nine times for 94 yards and a touchdown, and also recorded one reception for six yards. He finished the 2025 season with 84 carries for 382 yards and three touchdowns in 15 games and two starts.

== Career statistics ==
=== NFL ===
==== Regular season ====
Year	Team	Games		Rushing					Receiving						Fumbles	
Year	Team	GP	GS	Att	Yds	Avg	Lng	TD	Tgt	Rec	Yds	Avg	Lng	TD	Fum	Lost
2017	WAS	16	8	175	603	3.4	30	1	24	22	182	8.3	25T	1	2	2
2018	WAS	5	0	8	32	4.0	11	0	4	3	5	1.7	8	0	0	0
2019	CIN	6	0	0	0	0.0	0	0	0	0	0	0.0	0	0	0	0
2019	MIA	1	0	5	16	3.2	9	0	0	0	0	0.0	0	0	0	0
2020	CIN	16	1	63	301	4.8	46	3	12	11	66	6.0	15	0	0	0
2021	CIN	16	0	55	246	4.5	46	1	31	27	196	7.3	23	1	0	0
2022	CIN	16	2	95	394	4.1	29	2	51	38	287	7.6	32	4	0	0
2023	DEN	17	1	50	231	4.5	24	1	56	50	455	9.2	29	0	3	2
2024	KC	17	0	20	92	4.6	13	1	35	28	322	11.5	36	1	0	0
2025	CIN	15	2	84	382	4.5	32	3	21	17	87	5.1	16	0	3	0
Career		125	14	558	2,304	4.1	46	12	234	196	1,600	8.2	36	7	8	4

==== Postseason ====
Year	Team	Games		Rushing					Receiving					Fumbles	
Year	Team	GP	GS	Att	Yds	Avg	Lng	TD	Rec	Yds	Avg	Lng	TD	Fum	Lost
2021	CIN	4	0	3	2	0.7	2	0	4	47	11.8	41	1	0	0
2022	CIN	3	0	14	58	4.1	11	1	8	35	4.4	11	0	0	0
Career		7	0	17	60	3.5	11	1	12	82	6.8	41	1	0	0

=== College ===
Season	Team	Games		Rushing					Receiving		
Season	Team	GP	GS	Att	Yds	Avg	Lng	TD	Rec	Yds	TD
2014	Oklahoma	13	8	263	1,713	6.5	66	21	15	108	0
2015	Oklahoma	13	13	226	1,349	6.0	72	16	15	107	1
2016	Oklahoma	10	9	196	1,060	5.4	66	12	10	106	1
Total		36	30	685	4,122	6.0	72	49	40	321	2

== Personal life ==
During his time in high school and Oklahoma, Perine was noted for his acts of great physical strength, such as helping lift a car to help a fellow student who did not have a car jack in order to change a flat tire. Jerry Schmidt, strength coach of the Sooners, stated that he could often out bench press most of the team's linemen, with his max being 440 lbs. Schmidt also noted that nobody else on the team was able to top Perine's max squat (540 lbs), power clean (380 lbs), or incline bench (315 lbs) numbers.

Perine's cousin, La'Mical Perine, played running back for the Florida Gators and was selected by the New York Jets in 2020. He is also a cousin of NFL linebacker Myles Jack.
