= 2015 Cotton Bowl Classic (December) =

College Football Playoff Semifinal bowl game

2015 Goodyear Cotton Bowl Classic
- College Football Playoff Semifinal; 80th Cotton Bowl Classic
Michigan State Spartans	Alabama Crimson Tide
(12−1)	(12−1)
Big Ten	SEC
0	38
Head coach: Mark Dantonio	Head coach: Nick Saban
AP / Coaches / CFP; 3 / 4 / 3	AP / Coaches / CFP; 2 / 2 / 2
	1	2	3	4	Total
Michigan State	0	0	0	0	0
Alabama	0	10	21	7	38
- Date: December 31, 2015
- Season: 2015
- Stadium: AT&T Stadium
- Location: Arlington, Texas
- MVP: QB Jake Coker (Alabama); CB Cyrus Jones (Alabama)
- Favorite: Alabama by 10
- Referee: Mike Defee (Big XII)
- Attendance: 82,812

United States TV coverage
- Network: ESPN
- Announcers: Chris Fowler, Kirk Herbstreit, Heather Cox, and Tom Rinaldi
- Nielsen ratings: (18.5 million viewers)

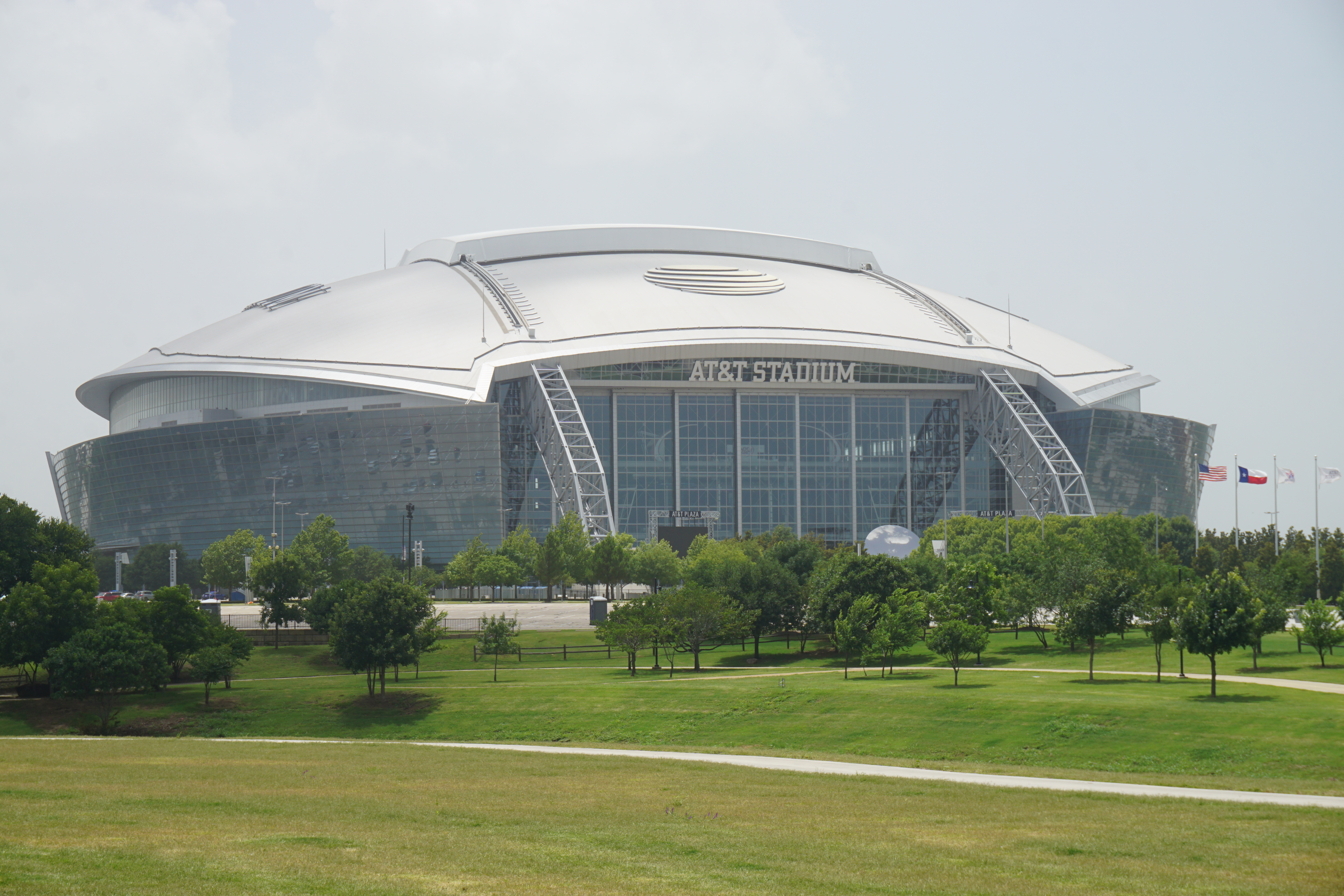
AT&T Stadium in Arlington, Texas, hosted the Cotton Bowl Classic.

The 2015 Cotton Bowl Classic (officially known as the College Football Playoff Semifinal at the 2015 Cotton Bowl Classic for sponsorship reasons) was a college football bowl game played on December 31, 2015, at AT&T Stadium in Arlington, Texas. The game was the 80th edition of the Cotton Bowl Classic and the second semifinal of the 2015–16 College Football Playoff (CFP), part of the slate of bowl games that concluded the 2015 FBS football season. The game featured two of the four teams chosen by the CFP selection committee: the No. 2 Alabama Crimson Tide from the Southeastern Conference (SEC) and the No. 3 Michigan State Spartans from the Big Ten Conference. The winner qualified for the 2016 College Football Playoff National Championship against the winner of the other semifinal, hosted by the Orange Bowl. The game was broadcast on ESPN, ESPN Deportes, ESPN Radio and XM Satellite Radio.

Alabama shut out Michigan State 38–0 to advance to the National Championship Game, where they defeated Clemson to win the championship.

== Teams ==
The Cotton Bowl acted as one of the two College Football Playoff semifinal games. The two teams selected for the game were No. 2 Alabama and No. 3 Michigan State. Michigan State returned to the Cotton Bowl after defeating Baylor in a non-playoff version of the bowl game on January 1, 2015. Michigan State became just the third school in history to play in the same bowl twice in a calendar year, joining Auburn, which played in the Gator Bowl on January 1 and December 31, 1954, and Oklahoma, which played in the Sugar Bowl on January 1 and December 31, 1972.

The game was a rematch of the 2011 Capital One Bowl, where Alabama defeated Michigan State 49–7.

== Game summary ==
After Oklahoma lost to Clemson 17–37 in the Orange Bowl Semifinal, Michigan State was throttled by Alabama 38–0. A tight first half saw Alabama take a 10–0 lead into half time. Near the end of the second quarter, Michigan State had its best drive of the night, but all-time winningest MSU quarterback, Connor Cook, was intercepted by Cyrus Jones. Alabama scored a touchdown on the opening possession of the second half and MSU turned the ball over on its first possession. Alabama could not capitalize on the turnover, but did return MSU's next punt for a touchdown, putting the game out of reach at 24–0 with a little over three minutes remaining in the third quarter. MSU's offense could not muster any points and were held to a total of 249 yards. Cook finished the night with zero touchdowns and two interceptions.

Alabama went on to defeat Clemson 45–40 for the 2016 College Football Playoff National Championship.

=== Scoring summary ===
Scoring summary

Quarter	Time	Drive			Team	Scoring information	Score	
Quarter	Time	Plays	Yards	TOP	Team	Scoring information	Michigan State	Alabama
2	5:36	6	80	2:38	Alabama	Derrick Henry 1-yard touchdown run, Adam Griffith kick good	0	7
2	1:25	7	43	2:39	Alabama	47-yard field goal by Adam Griffith	0	10
3	10:36	9	75	4:24	Alabama	Calvin Ridley 6-yard touchdown reception from Jake Coker, Adam Griffith kick good	0	17
3	3:24				Alabama	Punt returned 57 yards for touchdown by Cyrus Jones, Adam Griffith kick good	0	24
3	2:20	1	50	0:09	Alabama	Calvin Ridley 50-yard touchdown reception from Jake Coker, Adam Griffith kick good	0	31
4	7:52	3	69	0:09	Alabama	Derrick Henry 11-yard touchdown run, Adam Griffith kick good	0	38
"TOP" = time of possession. For other American football terms, see Glossary of American football.							0	38

== Statistics ==
Team statistical comparison
Statistic	Michigan State	Alabama
First downs	16	21
First downs rushing	2	7
First downs passing	11	12
First downs penalty	3	2
Third down efficiency	4–16	4–12
Fourth down efficiency	1–3	1–1
Total plays–net yards	65–239	66–440
Rushing attempts–net yards	26–29	35–154
Yards per rush	1.1	4.4
Yards passing	210	286
Pass completions–attempts	19–39	25–31
Interceptions thrown	2	0
Punt returns–total yards	3–16	5–80
Kickoff returns–total yards	1–22	0–0
Punts–average yardage	9–45.7	6–46.5
Fumbles–lost	2–0	2–0
Penalties–yards	6–33	6–69
Time of possession	27:04	32:56

Michigan State statistics
Spartans passing
	C–A	Yds	TD–INT
Connor Cook	19–39	210	0–2
Spartans rushing
	Car	Yds	TD
Damion Terry	1	14	0
Madre London	5	11	0
LJ Scott	6	8	0
Aaron Burbridge	3	8	0
Gerald Holmes	2	6	0
Delton Williams	2	6	0
Connor Cook	7	−24	0
Spartans receiving
	Rec	Yds	TD
Aaron Burbridge	5	39	0
Josiah Price	4	39	0
Felton Davis	1	28	0
Macgarrett Kings	2	27	0
DeAnthony Arnett	1	21	0
R.J. Shelton	2	19	0
Paul Lang	1	17	0
Gerald Holmes	2	10	0
Madre London	1	10	0

Alabama statistics
Crimson Tide passing
	C–A	Yds	TD–INT
Jake Coker	25–30	286	2–0
Cooper Bateman	0–1	0	0–0
Crimson Tide rushing
	Car	Yds	TD
Derrick Henry	20	75	2
Kenyan Drake	4	60	0
Bo Scarbrough	3	17	0
ArDarius Stewart	1	7	0
Damien Harris	1	2	0
TEAM	1	−1	0
Jake Coker	5	−6	0
Crimson Tide receiving
	Rec	Yds	TD
Calvin Ridley	8	138	2
O. J. Howard	3	59	0
Richard Mullaney	3	53	0
ArDarius Stewart	7	37	0
Kenyan Drake	3	5	0
Derrick Henry	1	−6	0
