= 2015 Orange Bowl =

College Football Playoff Semifinal bowl game

2015 Capital One Orange Bowl
- College Football Playoff Semifinal; 82nd Orange Bowl
Oklahoma Sooners	Clemson Tigers
(11−1)	(13−0)
Big 12	ACC
17	37
Head coach: Bob Stoops	Head coach: Dabo Swinney
AP / Coaches / CFP; 4 / 3 / 4	AP / Coaches / CFP; 1 / 1 / 1
	1	2	3	4	Total
Oklahoma	7	10	0	0	17
Clemson	3	13	14	7	37
- Date: December 31, 2015
- Season: 2015
- Stadium: Sun Life Stadium
- Location: Miami Gardens, Florida
- MVP: Deshaun Watson (QB, Clemson); Ben Boulware (LB, Clemson)
- Favorite: Oklahoma by 4
- Referee: Mike Cannon (Big Ten)
- Attendance: 67,615

United States TV coverage
- Network: ESPN
- Announcers: Brad Nessler, Todd Blackledge and Holly Rowe
- Nielsen ratings: (15.6 million viewers)

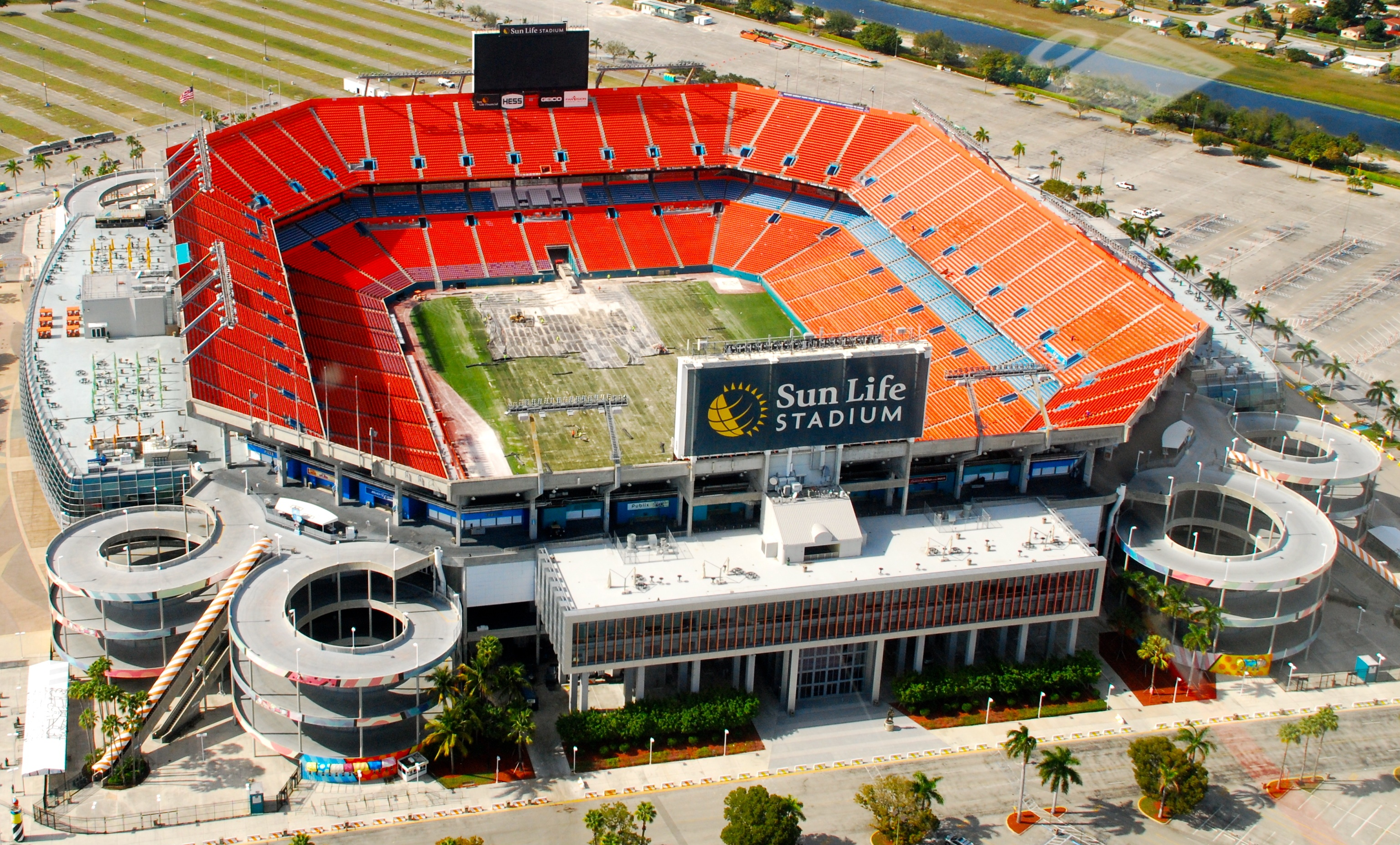
Sun Life Stadium in Miami Gardens, Florida, hosted the Orange Bowl.

The 2015 Orange Bowl (officially known as the College Football Playoff Semifinal at the 2015 Capital One Orange Bowl for sponsorship reasons) was a college football bowl game played on December 31, 2015, at Sun Life Stadium in Miami Gardens, Florida. The game was the 82nd playing of the Orange Bowl and the first semifinal of the 2015–16 College Football Playoff (CFP), part of the slate of bowl games which concluded the 2015 FBS football season. The game featured two of the four teams chosen by the CFP selection committee: the No. 1 Clemson Tigers from the Atlantic Coast Conference (ACC) and the No. 4 Oklahoma Sooners from the Big 12 Conference. The winner qualified for the 2016 College Football Playoff National Championship against the winner of the other semifinal, hosted by the Cotton Bowl Classic. The game was televised by ESPN.

== Teams ==
The two participants for the game were two of the semifinalists which were the Clemson Tigers and Oklahoma Sooners.

=== Clemson ===
Clemson began the season hoping to improve on their 10–3 record from last year. In the preseason poll, the Tigers ranked number 12, and to kick off the season, won their first 3 games. In their 4th game, they faced the undefeated and 6th ranked Notre Dame Fighting Irish, with both teams having playoff aspirations. Despite leading for most of the game, the game came down to a key 2 point conversion stop by Clemson, essentially sealing the game for the Tigers. The Tigers then won 4 more games to finally reach the number 1 ranking in all of the polls, just in time for a huge matchup with the defending ACC Champions, the Florida State Seminoles. Despite losing for most of the first half, Clemson came back in the 2nd half to win the game, 23–13. The Tigers then won the rest of their games, including a matchup with North Carolina in the ACC Championship game. Clemson won the game 45–37, to give Clemson their first ACC Championship since 2011.

=== Oklahoma ===
Oklahoma began their season hoping to improve from their 8–5 record from last year and also an annihilation in the Russel Athletic Bowl against Clemson. They were ranked number 19 in the preseason poll, but they won their first 4 games to rise to number 10 in the polls. In their 5th game, they were matched against Texas, a team that was at the time 1–4 and unranked. Oklahoma, despite being huge favorites, were stunned by the Longhorns 24–17, which dropped them to 4–1 and lowered their ranking to 19. Oklahoma responded strong to the loss, churning out 4 straight wins before looking at an extremely tough 3 game stretch which included the undefeated Baylor Bears, the 1 loss TCU Horned Frogs, and the undefeated Oklahoma State Cowboys. Oklahoma defeated undefeated Baylor 44–34, and rose to the number 7 spot in the polls. Later against TCU, Oklahoma dominated for most of the game, and even led 30–13 in the 4th Quarter. However, TCU mounted a furious comeback and had nearly tied the game up at 30, down 1, when TCU coach Gary Patterson decided to go for 2 at the end of the game. TCU was unable to convert the 2 point conversion, and Oklahoma survived. Their final challenge, the Oklahoma State Cowboys, who also had playoff hopes. Oklahoma destroyed their in-state rivals 58–23, and clinched the Big 12 Title.

== Game summary ==
=== 1st quarter ===
The game started off with a long Oklahoma drive that ended with a Samaje Perine 1-yard touchdown that put the Sooners up 7–0. The teams then exchanged punts, and then Clemson had a long drive that ended with a field goal, which brought the score to 7–3. Oklahoma was once again forced to punt, and that ended the first quarter, with the score sitting at 7–3.

=== 2nd quarter ===
Clemson's drive started off with a 46-yard run from their Heisman finalist quarterback Deshaun Watson. However, it looked like Clemson was going to have to punt when they ran a fake punt, which ended up with a 31-yard pass from Andy Teasdall to Christian Wilkins, a defensive lineman. This play set up a 5-yard touchdown run by Deshaun Watson, which gave Clemson their first lead of the night at 10–7. Oklahoma was then once again forced to punt, and Clemson took advantage, scoring another field goal to go up by 6. Both teams then exchanged field goals, which brought the score to 16–10 in favor of Clemson. With 2:17 remaining, Oklahoma drove down the length of the field to score a touchdown, which gave the Sooners a one-point lead. Clemson had an opportunity to reclaim the lead before halftime after a fake punt, however Watson's pass was later intercepted in the end zone, giving Oklahoma a 17–16 lead going into halftime.

=== 3rd quarter ===
Clemson received the opening kickoff and drove down the field during their opening possession of the second half down the field for a touchdown by running back Wayne Gallman, giving Clemson the lead again. Oklahoma on their ensuing possession was forced to punt, however Clemson couldn't capitalize, missing a 47-yard field goal. Oklahoma later got stuffed at Clemson's 30-yard line, turning the ball over on downs. This time, Clemson did capitalize, by running the ball to midfield and later passing the ball to Hunter Renfrow, his first touchdown of the night, increasing Clemson's lead. The remainder of the quarter was scoreless, giving Clemson a 13-point lead with 15 minutes left to play.

=== 4th quarter ===
The fourth quarter of the game for the most part was scoreless; but on Clemson's first possession of the quarter, Clemson ran the ball for another touchdown by Wayne Gallman, pushing the lead to 20 points. Oklahoma had several opportunities to score in the red zone, however the pass was intercepted, giving Clemson room to run out the clock. After close to 10 scoreless minutes in the 4th quarter, Clemson shut out Oklahoma in the second half, giving the Tigers a spot in the 2016 National Championship Game in Glendale, Arizona, against the Alabama Crimson Tide.

=== Scoring summary ===
College Football Playoff Semifinal at the 2015 Capital One Orange Bowl

Quarter	1	2	3	4	Total
No. 4 Oklahoma	7	10	0	0	17
No. 1 Clemson	3	13	14	7	37

at Sun Life Stadium • Miami Gardens, Florida

- Date: December 31, 2015
- Game time: 4:00 p.m. EST
- Game weather: n/a (game played indoors)
- Game attendance: 67,615
- Referee: Mike Cannon (Big Ten)
- TV announcers (ESPN): Brad Nessler (play-by-play), Todd Blackledge (analyst) and Holly Rowe (sideline)
- ESPN game summary

Scoring summary

Quarter	Time	Drive			Team	Scoring information	Score	
Quarter	Time	Plays	Yards	TOP	Team	Scoring information	Oklahoma	Clemson
1	11:16	10	75	3:44	Oklahoma	Samaje Perine 1-yard touchdown run, Austin Seibert kick good	7	0
1	2:04	9	19	2:47	Clemson	26-yard field goal by Greg Huegel	7	3
2	12:45	7	96	2:09	Clemson	Deshaun Watson 5-yard touchdown run, Greg Huegel kick good	7	10
2	7:05	10	61	3:15	Clemson	36-yard field goal by Greg Huegel	7	13
2	4:41	10	67	2:24	Oklahoma	22-yard field goal by Austin Seibert	10	13
2	2:17	9	49	2:24	Clemson	43-yard field goal by Greg Huegel	10	16
2	1:34	4	76	0:43	Oklahoma	Mark Andrews 11-yard touchdown reception from Baker Mayfield, Austin Seibert kick good	17	16
3	10:51	12	75	4:09	Clemson	Wayne Gallman 1-yard touchdown run, Greg Huegel kick good	17	23
3	4:07	4	70	1:21	Clemson	Hunter Renfrow 35-yard touchdown reception from Deshaun Watson, Greg Huegel kick good	17	30
4	10:48	9	50	4:40	Clemson	Wayne Gallman 4-yard touchdown run, Greg Huegel kick good	17	37
"TOP" = time of possession. For other American football terms, see Glossary of American football.							17	37

== Statistics ==
Team statistical comparison
Statistic	Oklahoma	Clemson
First downs	24	30
First downs rushing	6	17
First downs passing	16	10
First downs penalty	2	3
Third down efficiency	5–13	9–19
Fourth down efficiency	0–1	1–2
Total plays–net yards	76–378	90–530
Rushing attempts–net yards	33–67	58–312
Yards per rush	2.0	5.4
Yards passing	311	218
Pass completions–attempts	26–43	17–32
Interceptions thrown	2	1
Punt returns–total yards	0–0	1–5
Kickoff returns–total yards	4–97	2–35
Punts–average yardage	6–38.8	3–40.3
Fumbles–lost	0–0	1–0
Penalties–yards	5–65	5–40
Time of possession	24:45	35:15

Oklahoma statistics
Sooners passing
	C–A	Yds	TD–INT
Baker Mayfield	26–41	311	1–2
Cody Thomas	0–2	0	0–0
Sooners rushing
	Car	Yds	TD
Samaje Perine	15	58	1
Dede Westbrook	1	18	0
Sterling Shepard	1	5	0
Joe Mixon	3	4	0
Alex Ross	2	−1	0
TEAM	1	−2	0
Baker Mayfield	10	−15	0
Sooners receiving
	Rec	Yds	TD
Sterling Shepard	7	87	0
Dede Westbrook	4	69	0
Jarvis Baxter	3	36	0
Mark Andrews	2	32	1
Durron Neal	2	32	0
Samaje Perine	2	23	0
Jeffery Mead	2	19	0
Joe Mixon	3	11	0
Michiah Quick	1	2	0

Clemson statistics
Tigers passing
	C–A	Yds	TD–INT
Deshaun Watson	16–31	187	1–1
Andy Teasdall	1–1	31	0–0
Tigers rushing
	Car	Yds	TD
Wayne Gallman	26	150	2
Deshaun Watson	24	145	1
Zac Brooks	3	19	0
Ray-Ray McCloud	1	8	0
TEAM	3	−3	0
Artavis Scott	1	−7	0
Tigers receiving
	Rec	Yds	TD
Artavis Scott	5	63	0
Hunter Renfrow	4	59	1
Charone Peake	4	54	0
Christian Wilkins	1	31	0
Ray-Ray McCloud	2	6	0
Jordan Leggett	1	5	0
