= 2015 Oklahoma State Cowboys football team =

American college football season

2015 Oklahoma State Cowboys football

Sugar Bowl, L 20–48 vs. Ole Miss
- Conference: Big 12 Conference

Ranking
- Coaches: No. 19
- AP: No. 20
- Record: 10–3 (7–2 Big 12)
- Head coach: Mike Gundy (11th season)
- Offensive coordinator: Mike Yurcich (3rd season)
- Offensive scheme: Air raid
- Defensive coordinator: Glenn Spencer (3rd season)
- Base defense: 4–3
- Home stadium: Boone Pickens Stadium

2015 Big 12 Conference football standings
	Conf.			Overall
Team	W		L	W		L
No. 5 Oklahoma $^	8	–	1	11	–	2
No. 20 Oklahoma State	7	–	2	10	–	3
No. 7 TCU	7	–	2	11	–	2
No. 13 Baylor	6	–	3	10	–	3
West Virginia	4	–	5	8	–	5
Texas Tech	4	–	5	7	–	6
Texas	4	–	5	5	–	7
Kansas State	3	–	6	6	–	7
Iowa State	2	–	7	3	–	9
Kansas	0	–	9	0	–	12
^ – College Football Playoff participant; $ – Conference champion; Rankings from AP Poll

The 2015 Oklahoma State Cowboys football team represented Oklahoma State University in the 2015 NCAA Division I FBS football season. The Cowboys were led by 11th-year head coach Mike Gundy and played their home games at Boone Pickens Stadium in Stillwater, Oklahoma. They were members of the Big 12 Conference. They finished the season 10–3, 7–2 in Big 12 play to finish in a tie for second place. They were invited to the Sugar Bowl where they lost to Ole Miss.

== Personnel ==
=== Coaching staff ===
Name	Position	Seasons at Oklahoma State	Alma mater
Mike Gundy	Head coach	10	Oklahoma State (1990)
Mike Yurcich	Offensive coordinator/quarterbacks	2	California (PA) (1999)
Greg Adkins	Offensive line	0	Marshall (1990)
Marcus Arroyo	Running backs	0	San Jose State (2002)
Kasey Dunn	Wide receivers	5	Idaho (1992)
Jason McEndoo	Tight ends	0	Washington State (1998)
Glenn Spencer	Defensive coordinator/linebackers	2	Georgia Tech (1987)
Joe Bob Clements	Defensive line	2	Kansas State (1993)
Tim Duffie	Cornerbacks	2	Texas Tech (1999)
Dan Hammerschmidt	Safeties	0	Texas (1993)

== Schedule ==
Oklahoma State announced their 2015 football schedule on November 19, 2014. The 2015 schedule consist of 7 home games and 5 away games in the regular season. The Cowboys will host Big 12 foes Baylor, Kansas, Kansas State, Oklahoma, and TCU and will travel to Iowa State, Texas, Texas Tech, and West Virginia.

The Cowboys hosted two non conference games against Central Arkansas and UTSA and traveled to its other non conference foe Central Michigan in Mount Pleasant, Michigan. Oklahoma State met for the first time against the Central Michigan Chippewas in Michigan and Central Arkansas Bears at home. The Cowboys hosted the UTSA Roadrunners for the second straight season after defeating them last season 43–13.

Date	Time	Opponent	Rank	Site	TV	Result	Attendance
September 3	6:00 p.m.	at Central Michigan*		Kelly/Shorts Stadium; Mount Pleasant, MI	ESPNU	W 24–13	19,717
September 12	6:30 p.m.	Central Arkansas*		Boone Pickens Stadium; Stillwater, OK	FSN/FCS Atlantic	W 32–8	57,262
September 19	2:30 p.m.	UTSA*	No. 25	Boone Pickens Stadium; Stillwater, OK	FS1	W 69–14	56,351
September 26	2:30 p.m.	at Texas	No. 24	Darrell K Royal–Texas Memorial Stadium; Austin, TX	ESPN	W 30–27	87,073
October 3	3:00 p.m.	Kansas State	No. 20	Boone Pickens Stadium; Stillwater, OK	FS1	W 36–34	58,030
October 10	6:00 p.m.	at West Virginia	No. 21	Mountaineer Field; Morgantown, WV	ESPN2	W 33–26 ^{OT}	60,410
October 24	2:30 p.m.	Kansas^{†}	No. 14	Boone Pickens Stadium; Stillwater, OK	FS1	W 58–10	59,886
October 31	2:30 p.m.	at Texas Tech	No. 12	Jones AT&T Stadium; Lubbock, TX	ESPN	W 70–53	54,872
November 7	2:30 p.m.	No. 8 TCU	No. 14	Boone Pickens Stadium; Stillwater, OK	FOX	W 49–29	59,661
November 14	2:30 p.m.	at Iowa State	No. 8	Jack Trice Stadium; Ames, IA	ESPN	W 35–31	54,180
November 21	6:30 p.m.	No. 10 Baylor	No. 6	Boone Pickens Stadium; Stillwater, OK	FOX	L 35–45	59,669
November 28	7:00 p.m.	No. 3 Oklahoma	No. 11	Boone Pickens Stadium; Stillwater, OK (Bedlam Series) (College GameDay)	ABC	L 23–58	59,231
January 1, 2016	7:30 p.m.	vs. No. 12 Ole Miss*	No. 16	Mercedes-Benz Superdome; New Orleans, LA (Sugar Bowl)	ESPN	L 20–48	72,117
*Non-conference game; ^{†}Homecoming; Rankings from AP Poll and CFP Rankings after November 3 released prior to game; All times are in Central time

Schedule source:

== Games summaries ==
=== Central Michigan ===
	1	2	3	4	Total
Cowboys	3	7	7	7	24
Chippewas	3	3	7	0	13

=== Central Arkansas ===
	1	2	3	4	Total
Bears	0	0	8	0	8
Cowboys	10	0	10	12	32

=== UTSA ===
	1	2	3	4	Total
Roadrunners	0	7	0	7	14
Cowboys	17	14	10	28	69

=== Texas ===
	1	2	3	4	Total
Cowboys	14	3	7	6	30
Longhorns	6	14	7	0	27

=== Kansas State ===
	1	2	3	4	Total
Wildcats	14	14	0	6	34
Cowboys	7	13	6	10	36

Oklahoma State hosted Kansas State on October 3, 2015. Late in the second quarter, an officiating error gave Oklahoma State a first down when the offense was four yards short after the third down play. The series ended with a touchdown for Oklahoma State. The error brought into question Big 12 Conference officiating, especially in light that the game was on the 25th anniversary of the Fifth Down Game between the Colorado Buffaloes and Missouri Tigers. SB Nation published "K-State lost to Oklahoma State, 36–34. Inept Big 12 officials gifted Oklahoma State a touchdown.."

=== West Virginia ===
	1	2	3	4	OT	Total
Cowboys	7	10	6	3	7	33
Mountaineers	0	2	14	10	0	26

=== Kansas ===
	1	2	3	4	Total
Jayhawks	0	10	0	0	10
Cowboys	14	21	21	2	58

Prior to the game, during Oklahoma State University's annual Sea of Orange Homecoming Parade, 25 year old Adacia Chambers drove her car into a crowd of people at the parade killing 4 and injuring 47.

=== Texas Tech ===
	1	2	3	4	Total
Cowboys	14	14	14	28	70
Red Raiders	24	14	0	15	53

=== TCU ===
	1	2	3	4	Total
Horned Frogs	9	0	7	13	29
Cowboys	14	14	14	7	49

=== Iowa State ===
	1	2	3	4	Total
#5 Cowboys	7	7	7	14	35
Cyclones	17	7	7	0	31

=== Baylor ===
	1	2	3	4	Total
#10 Bears	14	10	14	7	45
#4 Cowboys	14	0	7	14	35

=== Oklahoma ===
	1	2	3	4	Total
#5 Sooners	14	30	7	7	58
#9 Cowboys	10	10	3	0	23

=== Vs. Ole Miss ===
	1	2	3	4	Total
#16 Cowboys	3	3	7	7	20
#12 Rebels	10	24	7	7	48

== Rankings ==
Ranking movements Legend: ██ Increase in ranking ██ Decrease in ranking RV = Received votes
	Week															
Poll	Pre	1	2	3	4	5	6	7	8	9	10	11	12	13	14	Final
AP	RV	RV	25	24	20	21	16	14	12	12	5	4	9	14	13	20
Coaches	RV	RV	25	22	19	19	15	12	10	10	5	4	10	14	13	19
CFP	Not released									14	8	6	11	17	16	Not released
