= Jamal Perry =

American football player (born 1994)

Profile
- Position: Cornerback

Personal information
- Born: October 23, 1994 (age 32); Galena Park, Texas, U.S.
- Listed height: 5 ft 10 in (1.78 m)
- Listed weight: 182 lb (83 kg)

Career information
- High school: North Shore (Houston, Texas)
- College: Iowa State
- NFL draft: 2017: undrafted

Career history
- Philadelphia Eagles (2017)*; New England Patriots (2017–2018)*; Miami Dolphins (2019–2022); Michigan Panthers (2024)*
- * Offseason or practice squad member only

Awards and highlights
- Super Bowl champion (LIII)

Career NFL statistics
- Games played: 31
- Total tackles: 86
- Pass deflections: 7
- Interceptions: 1
- Stats at Pro Football Reference

Jamal Perry (born Jomal Wiltz, October 23, 1994) is an American professional football cornerback. He played college football at Iowa State.

== Early life ==
In high school, Perry was a standout competitor in both football and track & field. In football, he was named to the second-team all-district team in 21-5A. At the 2013 state track & field meet, Wiltz placed third in the long jump and eighth in the 100 meter dash.

== College career ==
=== Trinity Valley Community College ===
Following high school, Perry continued his football career at Trinity Valley Community College in Athens, Texas. In his two seasons, they finished 10–2 and was ranked fifth in 2013 and 12–0 and ranked second in 2014. His second season he finished the year with 79 tackles, three tackles for a loss, one interception, and 14 passes defended, earning first-team all SWJCFC honors.

=== Iowa State ===
After his two years at Trinity Valley, Perry chose to attend Iowa State after getting interest from California, Tulsa, and UNLV. He was ranked the eighth-best corner in junior college during that recruiting cycle by ESPN.

In his first season at ISU, he played in all 12 games and started seven of them. He made 41 tackles, in addition to averaging 22.6 yards on kick returns. His season-bests were six solo tackles against Texas Tech and three tackles with two pass breakups against West Virginia.

In 2016 he started 11 of the 12 games and tied the team lead for interceptions with two. In addition, he recorded 49 tackles, two for a loss, and ranked seventh in the Big 12 Conference with 11 pass breakups. Perry's season highlights were eight tackles against UNI, seven tackles against Oklahoma, and a game-sealing interception against Kansas.

At the conclusion of the season he earned the Al and Dean Knudson Award as the team's best defensive player and was named honorable mention All-Big 12. In addition he was invited to compete in the College Gridiron Showcase.

=== Statistics ===
Year	Team	Games		Tackles				Interceptions					Fumbles	
Year	Team	G	GS	Comb	Solo	Ast	TFL	PD	Int	Yds	Avg	TD	FF	FR
2015	Iowa State	12	7	41	28	13	0.0	8	0	0	0.0	0	0	0
2016	Iowa State	12	11	49	32	17	2.0	9	2	27	13.5	0	0	0
Totals		24	18	90	60	30	2.0	17	2	27	13.5	0	0	0

== Professional career ==
=== Philadelphia Eagles ===
Perry signed with the Philadelphia Eagles as an undrafted free agent on May 11, 2017. He was waived on September 2, 2017.

=== New England Patriots ===
On September 7, 2017, Perry was signed to the practice squad of the New England Patriots. He was released by the Patriots on September 20, 2017 but was re-signed five days later. He signed a reserve/future contract with the Patriots on February 6, 2018.

On September 1, 2018, Perry was waived by the Patriots and was signed to the practice squad the next day. Perry won Super Bowl LIII when the Patriots beat the Los Angeles Rams 13–3.

=== Miami Dolphins ===
On February 15, 2019, Perry signed with the Miami Dolphins. He started his first NFL game in week 1 of 2019 against the Baltimore Ravens and recorded his first tackle. In week 9 against the New York Jets, Perry recorded his first career interception off Sam Darnold in the 26–18 win.

Perry was placed on the reserve/COVID-19 list by the Dolphins on December 9, 2020, and activated on December 18.

Perry was given an exclusive-rights free agent tender by the Dolphins on March 8, 2021. He signed the one-year contract on April 14. He was waived on September 1, 2021 and re-signed to the practice squad. He was promoted to the active roster on November 17. He was placed on injured reserve on November 23.

On October 25, 2022, Perry was signed to the Dolphins' practice squad.

On August 13, 2023, Perry re-signed with the Dolphins. He was released on August 29, 2023.

=== Michigan Panthers ===
On January 19, 2024, Perry was signed by the Michigan Panthers of the United Football League (UFL). He was released on March 10, 2024.

== Personal ==
Perry legally changed his name from Jomal Wiltz to Jamal Perry in March 2020.
