= 2015 Iowa State Cyclones football team =

American college football season

2015 Iowa State Cyclones football
- Conference: Big 12 Conference
- Record: 3–9 (2–7 Big 12)
- Head coach: Paul Rhoads (7th season)
- Offensive coordinator: Mark Mangino (2nd season; first seven games); Todd Sturdy (interim; remainder of season)
- Offensive scheme: Spread
- Defensive coordinator: Wally Burnham (7th season)
- Base defense: 4–3
- MVP: Allen Lazard
- Home stadium: Jack Trice Stadium

2015 Big 12 Conference football standings
| | Conf. | | | Overall |
| Team | W | | L | W | | L |
|---|---|---|---|---|---|---|
| No. 5 Oklahoma $^ | 8 | – | 1 | 11 | – | 2 |
| No. 20 Oklahoma State | 7 | – | 2 | 10 | – | 3 |
| No. 7 TCU | 7 | – | 2 | 11 | – | 2 |
| No. 13 Baylor | 6 | – | 3 | 10 | – | 3 |
| West Virginia | 4 | – | 5 | 8 | – | 5 |
| Texas Tech | 4 | – | 5 | 7 | – | 6 |
| Texas | 4 | – | 5 | 5 | – | 7 |
| Kansas State | 3 | – | 6 | 6 | – | 7 |
| Iowa State | 2 | – | 7 | 3 | – | 9 |
| Kansas | 0 | – | 9 | 0 | – | 12 |
^ – College Football Playoff participant; $ – Conference champion; Rankings from AP Poll

The 2015 Iowa State Cyclones football team represented Iowa State University as a member of Big 12 Conference during the 2015 NCAA Division I FBS football season. Led by Paul Rhoads in his seventh and final season, the Cyclones compiled an overall record of 3–9 with a mark of 2–7 in conference play, placing ninth in the Big 12. The team played home games at Jack Trice Stadium in Ames, Iowa.

On October 26, Mark Mangino was replaced as offensive coordinator with Todd Sturdy, formerly the passing game coordinator, on an interim basis. On November 23, Rhoads was fired. He stayed on to coach the final game of the season on November 28. He finished his tenure at Iowa State with a seven-year record of 32–55.

== Schedule ==
| Date | Time | Opponent | Site | TV | Result | Attendance | Source |
|---|---|---|---|---|---|---|---|
| September 5 | 7:00 p.m. | No. 10 (FCS) Northern Iowa* | Jack Trice Stadium; Ames, IA | Cyclones.tv | W 31–7 | 61,500 | |
| September 12 | 3:45 p.m. | Iowa* | Jack Trice Stadium; Ames, IA (rivalry) | FOX | L 17–31 | 61,500 | |
| September 19 | 7:00 p.m. | at Toledo* | Glass Bowl; Toledo, OH | ESPNews | L 23–30 ^{2OT} | 23,104 | |
| October 3 | 11:00 a.m. | Kansas | Jack Trice Stadium; Ames, IA | FSN | W 38–13 | 55,837 | |
| October 10 | 2:30 p.m. | at Texas Tech | Jones AT&T Stadium; Lubbock, TX | FSN | L 31–66 | 53,891 | |
| October 17 | 6:00 p.m. | No. 3 TCU | Jack Trice Stadium; Ames, IA | ESPN2 | L 21–45 | 52,480 | |
| October 24 | 11:00 a.m. | at No. 2 Baylor | McLane Stadium; Waco, TX | ESPN | L 27–45 | 45,512 | |
| October 31 | 6:00 p.m. | Texas^{†} | Jack Trice Stadium; Ames, IA | FS1 | W 24–0 | 53,616 | |
| November 7 | 6:00 p.m. | at No. 14 Oklahoma | Gaylord Family Oklahoma Memorial Stadium; Norman, OK | ESPNU | L 16–52 | 85,595 | |
| November 14 | 2:30 p.m. | No. 5 Oklahoma State | Jack Trice Stadium; Ames, IA | ESPN | L 31–35 | 54,180 | |
| November 21 | 11:00 a.m. | at Kansas State | Bill Snyder Family Football Stadium; Manhattan, KS (rivalry) | FS1 | L 35–38 | 53,297 | |
| November 28 | 11:00 a.m. | at West Virginia | Milan Puskar Stadium; Morgantown, WV | FS1 | L 6–30 | 42,446 | |
*Non-conference game; ^{†}Homecoming; Rankings from AP Poll released prior to the game; All times are in Central time

== Game summaries ==
=== Game 1: vs. Northern Iowa Panthers ===
Game One: Northern Iowa Panthers at Iowa State Cyclones – Game summary

| Quarter | 1 | 2 | 3 | 4 | Total |
|---|---|---|---|---|---|
| Panthers | 0 | 7 | 0 | 0 | 7 |
| Cyclones | 0 | 10 | 14 | 7 | 31 |

at Jack Trice Stadium, Ames, IA

- Date: September 5
- Game time: 7:00 p.m. CDT
- Game weather: Temperature: 88° • Wind: S 5 • Weather: Hazy
- Game attendance: 61,500
- Referee: Referee: Cooper Castleberry • Umpire: Jim Adams • Linesman: Bill Scott • Line judge: Frank LeBlanc • Back judge: Joel Wetzel • Field judge: Randy Smith • Side judge: Fulton Carson • Center judge: Stacy Hardin
- TV announcers (Cyclones.tv): Brent Blum (Play-by-play) & Sage Rosenfels (Color)

Game information

Second quarter

- UNI – 11:57 Savon Huggins 19 yd pass from Aaron Bailey, Michael Schmadeke XP good (UNI 7–0)
- ISU – 07:44 Joshua Thomas 1 yd run, Cole Netten XP good (Tied 7–7)
- ISU – 02:40 Cole Netten 24 yd field goal good (ISU 10–7)

Third quarter

- ISU – 10:05 Dondre Daley 36 yd pass from Sam B. Richardson, Cole Netten XP good (ISU 17–7)
- ISU – 01:03 Allen Lazard 13 yd pass from Sam B. Richardson, Cole Netten XP good (ISU 24–7)

Fourth quarter

- ISU – 03:00 Trever Ryen 81 yd punt return, Cole Netten XP good (ISU 31–7)

Top passers

- UNI – Aaron Bailey 11/19, 114 yards, 1 TD, 1 INT
- ISU – Sam B. Richardson 21/29, 233 yards, 2 TD

Top rushers

- UNI – Aaron Bailey 22 attempts, 85 yards
- ISU – Tyler Brown 11 attempts, 68 yards

Top receivers

- UNI – Darrian Miller 5 receptions, 58 yards
- ISU – Dondre Daley 4 receptions, 70 yards, 1 TD

Top tacklers

- UNI – Deiondre' Hall 9 tackles
- ISU – Jarnor Jones 9 tackles

=== Game 2: vs. Iowa Hawkeyes ===
Game Two: Iowa Hawkeyes at Iowa State Cyclones – Game summary

| Quarter | 1 | 2 | 3 | 4 | Total |
|---|---|---|---|---|---|
| Hawkeyes | 3 | 7 | 7 | 14 | 31 |
| Cyclones | 3 | 14 | 0 | 0 | 17 |

at Jack Trice Stadium, Ames, IA

- Date: September 12
- Game time: 3:51 p.m. CDT
- Game weather: Temperature: 67° • Wind: N 5 • Weather: Mostly Sunny
- Game attendance: 61,500
- Referee: Referee: Mike Cannon • Umpire: Ken Zelmanski • Linesman: Bruce Keeling • Line judge: Dan Gallagher • Back judge: Dennis Morris • Field judge: John Roggeman • Side judge: Grady Smith • Center judge: Mike Conlin
- TV announcers (FOX): Gus Johnson (Play-by-play), Joel Klatt (Color) & Molly McGrath (Sideline)

Game information

First quarter

- IOWA – 05:44 Marshall Koehn 49 yd field goal good (IOWA 3–0)
- ISU – 02:07 Cole Netten 37 yd field goal good (Tied 3–3)

Second quarter

- ISU – 13:12 Quenton Bundrage 11 yd pass from Sam B. Richardson, Cole Netten XP good (ISU 10–3)
- IOWA – 04:24 Tevaun Smith 14 yd pass from C. J. Beathard, Marshall Koehn XP good (Tied 10–10)
- ISU – 02:19 Jauan Wesley 29 yd pass from Sam B. Richardson, Cole Netten XP good (ISU 17–10)

Third quarter

- IOWA – 10:05 Matt VandeBerg 3 yd pass from C. J. Beathard, Marshall Koehn XP good (Tied 17–17)

Fourth quarter

- IOWA – 02:14 Riley McCarron 25 yd pass from C. J. Beathard, Marshall Koehn XP good (IOWA 24–17)
- IOWA – 01:05 Jordan Canzeri 1 yd run, Marshall Koehn XP good (IOWA 31–17)

Top passers

- IOWA – C. J. Beathard 15/25, 215 yards, 3 TD
- ISU – Sam B. Richardson 19/35, 247 yards, 2 TD, 1 INT

Top rushers

- IOWA – Jordan Canzeri 24 attempts, 124 yards, 2 TD
- ISU – Trever Ryen 4 attempts, 23 yards

Top receivers

- IOWA – Matt VandeBerg 9 receptions, 114 yards, 1 TD
- ISU – Jauan Wesley 4 receptions, 76 yards, 1 TD

Top tacklers

- IOWA – Nate Meier 7 tackles
- ISU – Kamari Cotton–Moya 9 tackles

=== Game 3: at Toledo Rockets ===
Game Three: Iowa State Cyclones at Toledo Rockets – Game summary

| Quarter | 1 | 2 | 3 | 4 | OT | 2OT | Total |
|---|---|---|---|---|---|---|---|
| Cyclones | 3 | 7 | 0 | 10 | 3 | 0 | 23 |
| Rockets | 10 | 3 | 7 | 0 | 3 | 7 | 30 |

at Glass Bowl, Toledo, OH

- Date: September 19
- Game time: 8:02 p.m. EDT
- Game weather: Temperature: 68° • Wind: NW 9 • Weather: Partly cloudy
- Game attendance: 23,104
- Referee: Referee: Reggie Smith • Umpire: Joel Bellinger • Linesman: Mike Moeller • Line judge: Mark Stewart • Back judge: Lyndon Nixon • Field judge: Matt Mills • Side judge: Tim Murray • Center judge: Dan Scanlan
- TV announcers (ESPNews): Eamon McAnaney (Play-by-play) & Rocky Boiman (Color)

Game information

First quarter

- TOL – 11:39 Jameson Vest 30 yd field goal good (TOL 3–0)
- ISU – 06:34 Cole Netten 35 yd field goal good (Tied 3–3)
- TOL – 01:16 Alonzo Russell 3 yd pass from Phillip Ely, Jameson Vest XP good (TOL 10–3)

Second quarter

- TOL – 07:17 Jameson Vest 19 yd field goal good (TOL 13–3)
- ISU – 03:50 D'Vario Montgomery 59 yd pass from Sam B. Richardson, Cole Netten XP good (TOL 13–10)

Third quarter

- TOL – 11:32 Alex Zmolik 0 yd fumble recovery, Jameson Vest XP good (TOL 20–10)

Fourth quarter

- ISU – 11:23 Trever Ryen 1 yd run, Cole Netten XP good (TOL 20–17)
- ISU – 06:27 Cole Netten 47 yd field goal good (Tied 20–20)

First overtime

- ISU – 15:00 Cole Netten 44 yd field goal good (ISU 23–20)
- TOL – 15:00 Jameson Vest 42 yd field goal good (Tied 23–23)

Second overtime

- TOL – 15:00 Damion Jones–Moore 10 yd run, Jameson Vest XP good (TOL 30–23)

Top passers

- ISU – Sam B. Richardson 25/42, 269 yards, 1 TD
- TOL – Phillip Ely 11/28, 138 yards, 1 TD, 1 INT

Top rushers

- ISU – Mike Warren 21 attempts, 126 yards
- TOL – Kareem Hunt 24 attempts, 129 yards

Top receivers

- ISU – D'Vario Montgomery 4 receptions, 97 yards, 1 TD
- TOL – Corey Jones 4 receptions, 54 yards

Top tacklers

- ISU – Kamari Cotton–Moya 6 tackles
- TOL – Jaylen Coleman 16 tackles

=== Game 4: vs. Kansas Jayhawks ===
Game Four: Kansas Jayhawks at Iowa State Cyclones – Game summary

| Quarter | 1 | 2 | 3 | 4 | Total |
|---|---|---|---|---|---|
| Jayhawks | 0 | 0 | 6 | 7 | 13 |
| Cyclones | 3 | 14 | 14 | 7 | 38 |

at Jack Trice Stadium, Ames, IA

- Date: October 3
- Game time: 11:05 a.m. CDT
- Game weather: Temperature: 51° • Wind: E 5–10 • Weather: Sunny
- Game attendance: 55,837
- Referee: Referee: Brad Van Vark • Umpire: Michael Cooper • Linesman: George Gusman • Line judge: Jerod Phillips • Back judge: Brian Ernest • Field judge: Jason Ledet • Side judge: Gene Semko • Center judge: Brian Alos
- TV announcers (FSN): Mark Followill (Play-by-play), Brian Baldinger (Color) & Lesley McCaslin (Sideline)

Game information

First quarter

- ISU – 01:54 Cole Netten 34 yd field goal good (ISU 3–0)

Second quarter

- ISU – 05:40 Sam B. Richardson 4 yd run, Cole Netten XP good (ISU 10–0)
- ISU – 00:27 Allen Lazard 9 yd pass from Sam B. Richardson, Cole Netten XP good (ISU 17–0)

Third quarter

- ISU – 09:47 Mike Warren 62 yd run, Cole Netten XP good (ISU 24–0)
- KU – 05:36 Tre' Parmalee 47 yd pass from Montell Cozart, Nick Bartolotta XP no good (ISU 24–6)
- ISU – 02:15 D'Vario Montgomery 13 yd pass from Sam B. Richardson, Cole Netten XP good (ISU 31–6)

Fourth quarter

- KU – 13:30 Marcquis Roberts 83 yd interception return, Nick Bartolotta XP good (ISU 31–13)
- ISU – 11:34 Mike Warren 7 yd run, Cole Netten XP good (ISU 38–13)

Top passers

- KU – Montell Cozart 15/21, 150 yards, 1 TD
- ISU – Sam B. Richardson 27/37, 269 yards, 2 TD, 2 INT

Top rushers

- KU – Ke'aun Kinner 11 attempts, 46 yards
- ISU – Mike Warren 18 attempts, 175 yards, 2 TD

Top receivers

- KU – Tre' Parmalee 5 receptions, 81 yards, 1 TD
- ISU – Allen Lazard 6 receptions, 75 yards, 1 TD

Top tacklers

- KU – Fish Smithson 13 tackles
- ISU – Brian Peavy 10 tackles

=== Game 5: at Texas Tech Red Raiders ===
Game Five: Iowa State Cyclones at Texas Tech Red Raiders – Game summary

| Quarter | 1 | 2 | 3 | 4 | Total |
|---|---|---|---|---|---|
| Cyclones | 7 | 14 | 3 | 7 | 31 |
| Red Raiders | 17 | 21 | 7 | 21 | 66 |

at Jones AT&T Stadium, Lubbock, TX

- Date: October 10
- Game time: 2:35 p.m. CDT
- Game weather: Temperature: 76° • Wind: SW 18 • Weather: Mostly cloudy
- Game attendance: 53,891
- Referee: Referee: Dan Romeo • Umpire: Scott Teifer • Linesman: Andy Warner • Line judge: Marc Bovos • Back judge: Chris Alston • Field judge: Ed Vinzant • Side judge: Craig Faulkner • Alternate: Ken Ray
- TV announcers (FSN): Mark Followill (Play-by-play), Brian Baldinger (Color) & Lesley McCaslin (Sideline)

Game information

First quarter

- TTU – 11:27 Clayton Hatfield 24 yd field goal good (TTU 3–0)
- TTU – 10:44 DeAndre Washington 7 yd run, Clayton Hatfield XP good (TTU 10–0)
- ISU – 07:03 Quenton Bundrage 33 yd pass from Sam B. Richardson, Cole Netten XP good (TTU 10–7)
- TTU – 06:48 Jakeem Grant 75 yd pass from Patrick Mahomes, Clayton Hatfield XP good (TTU 17–7)

Second quarter

- ISU – 14:18 Joshua Thomas 1 yd run, Cole Netten XP good (TTU 17–14)
- TTU – 12:02 Reginald Davis 33 yd pass from Patrick Mahomes, Clayton Hatfield XP good (TTU 24–14)
- TTU – 08:21 DeAndre Washington 49 yd pass from Patrick Mahomes, Clayton Hatfield XP good (TTU 31–14)
- TTU – 02:42 Jakeem Grant 37 yd pass from Patrick Mahomes, Clayton Hatfield XP good (TTU 38–14)
- ISU – 01:30 Joshua Thomas 1 yd run, Cole Netten XP good (TTU 38–21)

Third quarter

- ISU – 06:02 Cole Netten 20 yd field goal good (TTU 38–24)
- TTU – 03:37 Justin Stockton 54 yd run, Clayton Hatfield XP good (TTU 45–24)

Fourth quarter

- TTU – 14:54 Jonathan Giles 3 yd pass from Patrick Mahomes, Clayton Hatfield XP good (TTU 52–24)
- TTU – 07:35 Jonathan Giles 21 yd pass from Davis Webb, Clayton Hatfield XP good (TTU 59–24)
- TTU – 03:56 Demarcus Felton 53 yd run, Clayton Hatfield XP good (TTU 66–24)
- ISU – 00:59 Cole Netten 20 yd field goal good (TTU 66–31)

Top passers

- ISU – Sam B. Richardson 10/21, 139 yards, 1 TD, 3 INT
- TTU – Patrick Mahomes 33/46, 428 yards, 5 TD

Top rushers

- ISU – Mike Warren 23 attempts, 235 yards
- TTU – Justin Stockton 7 attempts, 101 yards, 1 TD

Top receivers

- ISU – Quenton Bundrage 3 receptions, 75 yards, 1 TD
- TTU – Jakeem Grant 9 receptions, 166 yards, 2 TD

Top tacklers

- ISU – Willie Harvey 10 tackles
- TTU – Dakota Allen 11 tackles

=== Game 6: vs. TCU Horned Frogs ===
Game Six: TCU Horned Frogs at Iowa State Cyclones – Game summary

| Quarter | 1 | 2 | 3 | 4 | Total |
|---|---|---|---|---|---|
| Horned Frogs | 14 | 10 | 7 | 14 | 45 |
| Cyclones | 21 | 0 | 0 | 0 | 21 |

at Jack Trice Stadium, Ames, IA

- Date: October 17
- Game time: 6:05 p.m. CDT
- Game weather: Temperature: 54° • Wind: S 0–5 • Weather: Clear skies
- Game attendance: 52,480
- Referee: Referee: Mike Defee • Umpire: Robert Richeson • Linesman: Al Green • Line judge: Kelly Deterding • Back judge: Terry Jones • Field judge: Joe Blubaugh • Side judge: Lo Van Pham • Center judge: Mike Cuttone
- TV announcers (ESPN2): Beth Mowins (Play-by-play), Anthony Becht (Color) & Paul Carcaterra (Sideline)

Game information

First quarter

- ISU – 11:08 Joshua Thomas 2 yd run, Cole Netten XP good (ISU 7–0)
- TCU – 10:13 Josh Doctson 20 yd pass from Trevone Boykin, Jaden Oberkrom XP good (Tied 7–7)
- TCU – 06:38 Kolby Listenbee 21 yd pass from Trevone Boykin, Jaden Oberkrom XP good (TCU 14–7)
- ISU – 06:01 Allen Lazard 74 yd pass from Joel Lanning, Cole Netten XP good (Tied 14–14)
- ISU – 01:49 Mike Warren 4 yd run, Cole Netten XP good (ISU 21–14)

Second quarter

- TCU – 14:55 Charlie Reid 14 yd pass from Trevone Boykin, Jaden Oberkrom XP good (Tied 21–21)
- TCU – 00:02 Jaden Oberkrom 23 yd field goal good (TCU 24–21)

Third quarter

- TCU – 11:24 Kyle Hicks 13 yd run, Jaden Oberkrom XP good (TCU 31–21)

Fourth quarter

- TCU – 14:36 Trevone Boykin 3 yd run, Jaden Oberkrom XP good (TCU 38–21)
- TCU – 08:45 Josh Doctson 42 yd pass from Trevone Boykin, Jaden Oberkrom XP good (TCU 45–21)

Top passers

- TCU – Trevone Boykin 27/32, 436 yards, 4 TD
- ISU – Sam B. Richardson 22/36, 251 yards

Top rushers

- TCU – Trevone Boykin 13 attempts, 74 yards, 1 TD
- ISU – Mike Warren 22 attempts, 78 yards, 1 TD

Top receivers

- TCU – Josh Doctson 10 receptions, 190 yards, 2 TD
- ISU – Allen Lazard 5 receptions, 147 yards, 1 TD

Top tacklers

- TCU – Nick Orr 10 tackles
- ISU – Kamari Cotton–Moya 9 tackles

=== Game 7: at Baylor Bears ===
Game Seven: Iowa State Cyclones at Baylor Bears – Game summary

| Quarter | 1 | 2 | 3 | 4 | Total |
|---|---|---|---|---|---|
| Cyclones | 0 | 7 | 7 | 13 | 27 |
| Bears | 21 | 14 | 0 | 10 | 45 |

at McLane Stadium, Waco, TX

- Date: October 24
- Game time: 11:02 a.m. CDT
- Game weather: Temperature: 68° • Wind: NE 10 • Weather: Cloudy
- Game attendance: 45,512
- Referee: Referee: Brad Van Vark • Umpire: Michael Cooper • Linesman: George Gusman • Line judge: Jerod Phillips • Back judge: Brian Ernest • Field judge: Jason Ledet • Side judge: Gene Semko • Center judge: Brian Alos
- TV announcers (ESPN): Bob Wischusen (Play-by-play), Brock Huard (Color) & Shannon Spake (Sideline)

Game information

First quarter

- BAY – 13:25 Corey Coleman 36 yd pass from Seth Russell, Chris Callahan XP good (BAY 7–0)
- BAY – 08:00 Seth Russell 37 yd run, Chris Callahan XP good (BAY 14–0)
- BAY – 04:53 Shock Linwood 17 yd run, Chris Callahan XP good (BAY 21–0)

Second quarter

- BAY – 11:42 Shock Linwood 6 yd pass from Seth Russell, Chris Callahan XP good (BAY 28–0)
- BAY – 08:14 Devin Chafin 2 yd run, Chris Callahan XP good (BAY 35–0)
- ISU – 04:49 Joshua Thomas 3 yd run, Cole Netten XP good (BAY 35–7)

Third quarter

- ISU – 10:31 Quenton Bundrage 2 yd pass from Joel Lanning, Cole Netten XP good (BAY 35–14)

Fourth quarter

- ISU – 07:47 Jauan Wesley 4 yd pass from Joel Lanning, Cole Netten XP no good (BAY 35–20)
- BAY – 05:31 Chris Callahan 34 yd field goal good (BAY 38–21)
- BAY – 02:13 Corey Coleman 12 yd pass from Jarrett Stidham, Chris Callahan XP good (BAY 45–20)
- ISU – 00:10 Quenton Bundrage 29 yd pass from Joel Lanning, Cole Netten XP good (BAY 45–27)

Top passers

- ISU – Joel Lanning 12/17, 144 yards, 3 TD
- BAY – Seth Russell 16/37, 197 yards, 2 TD, 1 INT

Top rushers

- ISU – Mike Warren 28 attempts, 145 yards
- BAY – Shock Linwood 27 attempts, 171 yards, 1 TD

Top receivers

- ISU – Quenton Bundrage 4 receptions, 69 yards, 2 TD
- BAY – Corey Coleman 6 receptions, 85 yards, 2 TD

Top tacklers

- ISU – Qujuan Floyd 10 tackles
- BAY – Travon Blanchard 10 tackles

=== Game 8: vs. Texas Longhorns ===
Game Eight: Texas Longhorns at Iowa State Cyclones – Game summary

| Quarter | 1 | 2 | 3 | 4 | Total |
|---|---|---|---|---|---|
| Longhorns | 0 | 0 | 0 | 0 | 0 |
| Cyclones | 7 | 3 | 7 | 7 | 24 |

at Jack Trice Stadium, Ames, IA

- Date: October 31
- Game time: 6:10 p.m. CDT
- Game weather: Temperature: 51° • Wind: SE 0–5 • Weather: Partly cloudy
- Game attendance: 53,616
- Referee: Referee: Dan Romeo • Umpire: Scott Teifer • Linesman: Andy Warner • Line judge: Marc Bovos • Back judge: Chris Alston • Field judge: Ed Vinzant • Side judge: Craig Faulkner • Center judge: Ken Ray
- TV announcers (FS1): Tim Brando (Play-by-play) & Spencer Tillman (Color)

Game information

First quarter

- ISU – 08:38 Mike Warren 3 yd run, Cole Netten XP good (ISU 7–0)

Second quarter

- ISU – 00:05 Cole Netten 28 yd field goal good (ISU 10–0)

Third quarter

- ISU – 05:11 Dondre Daley 19 yd pass from Joel Lanning, Cole Netten XP good (ISU 17–0)

Fourth quarter

- ISU – 02:10 Joshua Thomas 1 yd run, Cole Netten XP good (ISU 24–0)

Top passers

- TEX – Tyrone Swoopes 6/13, 59 yards
- ISU – Joel Lanning 19/37, 188 yards, 1 TD

Top rushers

- TEX – Tyrone Swoopes 10 attempts, 58 yards
- ISU – Mike Warren 32 attempts, 158 yards, 1 TD

Top receivers

- TEX – Daje Johnson 6 receptions, 37 yards
- ISU – Allen Lazard 6 receptions, 66 yards

Top tacklers

- TEX – Peter Jinkens 9 tackles
- ISU – Qujuan Floyd 8 tackles

=== Game 9: at Oklahoma Sooners ===
Game Nine: Iowa State Cyclones at Oklahoma Sooners – Game summary

| Quarter | 1 | 2 | 3 | 4 | Total |
|---|---|---|---|---|---|
| Cyclones | 3 | 6 | 0 | 7 | 16 |
| Sooners | 21 | 0 | 17 | 14 | 52 |

at Gaylord Family Oklahoma Memorial Stadium, Norman, OK

- Date: November 7
- Game time: 6:02 p.m. CST
- Game weather: Temperature: 59° • Wind: NNE 12 • Weather: Clear
- Game attendance: 85,595
- Referee: Referee: Eddy Shelton • Umpire: Rick Podraza • Linesman: Rick Smith • Line judge: Kelly Detering • Back judge: Terry White • Field judge: Nick Lave • Side judge: Jim Murphy • Center judge: Steve Baron
- TV announcers (ESPNU): Roy Philpott (Play-by-play) & Jay Walker (Color)

Game information

First Quarter

- ISU – 10:46 Cole Netten 43 yd field goal (ISU 3–0)
- OU – 10:33 Dimitri Flowers 75 yd pass from Baker Mayfield, Austin Seibert XP good (OU 7–3)
- OU – 05:53 Dede Westbrook 27 yd pass from Baker Mayfield, Austin Seibert XP good (OU 14–3)
- OU – 03:33 Baker Mayfield 17 yd run, Austin Seibert XP good (OU 21–3)

Second Quarter

- ISU – 11:35 Cole Netten 45 yd field goal (OU 21–6)
- ISU – 01:14 Cole Netten 51 yd field goal (OU 21–9)

Third Quarter

- OU – 11:07 Austin Seibert 37 yd field goal (OU 24–9)
- OU – 07:03 Samaje Perine 8 yd run, Austin Seibert XP good (OU 31–9)
- OU – 01:05 Sterling Shepard 74 yd pass from Baker Mayfield, Austin Seibert XP good (OU 38–9)

Fourth Quarter

- OU – 11:19 Joe Mixon 57 yd run, Austin Seibert XP good (OU 45–9)
- OU – 08:51 Mark Andrews 55 yd pass from Trevor Knight, Austin Seibert XP good (OU 52–9)
- ISU – 05:08 D'Vario Montgomery 13 yd pass from Joel Lanning, Cole Netten XP good (OU 52–16)

Top Passers

- ISU – Joel Lanning 26/51, 260 yards, 1 TD, 1 INT
- OU – Baker Mayfield 23/31, 342 yards, 3 TD

Top Rushers

- ISU – Mike Warren 18 attempts, 43 yards
- OU – Samaje Perine 13 attempts, 95 yards, 1 TD

Top Receiving

- ISU – Allen Lazard 8 receptions, 101 yards
- OU – Sterling Shepard 4 receptions, 94 yards, 1 TD

Top Tacklers

- ISU – Brian Peavy 9 tackles
- OU – Ahmad Thomas 10 tackles

=== Game 10: vs. Oklahoma State Cowboys ===
Game Ten: Oklahoma State Cowboys at Iowa State Cyclones – Game summary

| Quarter | 1 | 2 | 3 | 4 | Total |
|---|---|---|---|---|---|
| Cowboys | 7 | 7 | 7 | 14 | 35 |
| Cyclones | 17 | 7 | 7 | 0 | 31 |

at Jack Trice Stadium, Ames, IA

- Date: November 14
- Game time: 2:35 p.m. CST
- Game weather: Temperature: 60° • Wind: SSW 10 • Weather: Scattered clouds
- Game attendance: 54,180
- Referee: Referee: Cooper Castleberry • Umpire: Jim Adams • Linesman: Bill Scott • Line judge: Frank LeBlanc • Back judge: Joel Wetzel • Field judge: Randy Smith • Side judge: Fulton Carson • Center judge: Stacy Hardin
- TV announcers (ESPN): Adam Amin (Play-by-play), Kelly Stouffer (Color) & Olivia Harlan (Sideline)

Game information

First quarter

- ISU – 13:10 Joel Lanning 24 yd run, Cole Netten XP good (ISU 7–0)
- OSU – 09:44 Marcell Ateman 16 yd pass from Mason Rudolph, Ben Grogan XP good (Tied 7–7)
- ISU – 06:58 Allen Lazard 24 yd pass from Joel Lanning, Cole Netten XP good (ISU 14–7)
- ISU – 03:04 Cole Netten 21 yd field goal good (ISU 17–7)

Second quarter

- ISU – 09:29 Joshua Thomas 1 yd run, Cole Netten XP good (ISU 24–7)
- OSU – 02:14 Chris Carson 1 yd run, Ben Grogan XP good (ISU 24–14)

Third quarter

- OSU – 08:44 J. W. Walsh 1 yd run, Ben Grogan XP good (ISU 24–21)
- ISU – 02:04 Joel Lanning 21 yd run, Cole Netten XP good (ISU 31–21)

Fourth quarter

- OSU – 11:33 J. W. Walsh 16 yd run, Ben Grogan XP good (ISU 31–28)
- OSU – 03:06 Jeff Carr 7 yd pass from J. W. Walsh, Ben Grogan XP good (OSU 35–31)

Top passers

- OSU – Mason Rudolph 24/36, 327 yards, 1 TD
- ISU – Joel Lanning 11/22, 162 yards, 1 TD, 1 INT

Top rushers

- OSU – Chris Carson 12 attempts, 70 yards, 1 TD
- ISU – Joel Lanning 14 attempts, 130 yards, 2 TD

Top receivers

- OSU – Marcell Ateman 8 receptions, 132 yards, 1 TD
- ISU – Allen Lazard 3 receptions, 74 yards, 1 TD

Top tacklers

- OSU – Jordan Sterns 8 tackles
- ISU – Brian Peavy 12 tackles

=== Game 11: at Kansas State Wildcats ===
Game Eleven: Iowa State Cyclones – Game summary

| Quarter | 1 | 2 | 3 | 4 | Total |
|---|---|---|---|---|---|
| Cyclones | 7 | 28 | 0 | 0 | 35 |
| Wildcats | 7 | 7 | 7 | 17 | 38 |

at Bill Snyder Family Football Stadium, Manhattan, KS

- Date: November 21
- Game time: 11:05 a.m. CST
- Game weather: Temperature: 36° • Wind: N 11–15 • Weather: Mostly sunny
- Game attendance: 53,297
- Referee: Referee: Brad Van Vark • Umpire: Michael Cooper • Linesman: George Gusman • Line judge: Jerod Phillips • Back judge: Brian Ernest • Field judge: Jason Ledet • Side judge: Gene Semko • Center judge: Brian Alos
- TV announcers (FS1): Justin Kutcher (Play-by-play) & Steve Hutchinson (Color)

Game information

First quarter

- ISU – 09:36 Trever Ryen 21 yd pass from Joel Lanning, Cole Netten XP good (ISU 7–0)
- KSU – 04:50 Winston Dimel 4 yd pass from Glenn Gronkowski, Jack Cantele XP good (Tied 7–7)

Second quarter

- ISU – 12:21 Joel Lanning 1 yd run, Cole Netten XP good (ISU 14–7)
- ISU – 08:11 Allen Lazard 30 yd pass from Joel Lanning, Cole Netten XP good (ISU 21–7)
- KSU – 07:59 Morgan Burns 100 yd kickoff return, Jack Cantle XP good (ISU 21–14)
- ISU – 07:34 Mike Warren 76 yd run, Cole Netten XP good (ISU 28–14)
- ISU – 00:29 Allen Lazard 16 yd pass from Joel Lanning, Cole Netten XP good (ISU 35–14)

Third quarter

- KSU – 08:49 Charles Jones 8 yd run, Jack Cantele XP good (ISU 35–21)

Fourth quarter

- KSU – 13:13 Kody Cook 7 yd pass from Joe Hubener, Jack Cantele XP good (ISU 35–28)
- KSU – 00:42 Charles Jones 5 yd run, Jack Cantele XP good (Tied 35–35)
- KSU – 00:03 Jack Cantele 42 yd field goal good (KSU 38–35)

Top passers

- ISU – Joel Lanning 15/20, 210 yards, 3 TD
- KSU – Joe Hubener 18/31, 216 yards, 1 TD

Top rushers

- ISU – Mike Warren 22 attempts, 195 yards, 1 TD
- KSU – Joe Hubener 20 attempts, 90 yards

Top receivers

- ISU – Allen Lazard 5 receptions, 87 yards, 2 TD
- KSU – Kody Cook 5 receptions, 68 yards, 1 TD

Top tacklers

- ISU – Brian Mills 8 tackles
- KSU – Kendall Adams 12 tackles

=== Game 12: at West Virginia Mountaineers ===
Game Twelve: Iowa State Cyclones at West Virginia Mountaineers – Game summary

| Quarter | 1 | 2 | 3 | 4 | Total |
|---|---|---|---|---|---|
| Cyclones | 0 | 6 | 0 | 0 | 6 |
| Mountaineers | 7 | 6 | 10 | 7 | 30 |

at Mountaineer Field, Morgantown, WV

- Date: November 28
- Game time: Noon EST
- TV announcers (FS1): Steve Physioc (Play-by-play) & Petros Papadakis (Color)

== Roster ==
2015 Iowa State Cyclones football team roster
Players
Coaches
Offense

| Pos. | # | Name | Class |
|---|---|---|---|
| TE | 86 | Cole Anderson | Fr |
| TE | 95 | Brian Boesen | Sr |
| RB | 26 | Brian Bonacci | Jr |
| RB | 6 | Tyler Brown | So |
| WR | 9 | Quenton Bundrage | Sr |
| OL | 70 | Daniel Burton | Jr |
| WR | 18 | Hakeem Butler | Fr |
| OL | 67 | Jake Campos | So |
| TE | 88 | Justin Chandler | Jr |
| RB | 25 | Sheldon Croney Jr. | Fr |
| OL | 79 | Shawn Curtis | So |
| OL | 72 | Brock Dagel | Sr |
| WR | 13 | Dondre Daley | Jr |
| QB | 8 | Dominic De Lira | Fr |
| OL | 66 | Jacob Dunning | Jr |
| WR | 80 | Carson Epps | Fr |
| OL | 62 | Nick Fett | Jr |
| OL | 63 | Ryan Glenn | So |
| OL | 51 | Julian Good-Jones | Fr |
| RB | 22 | Mitchell Harger | Jr |
| WR | 15 | Brandon Harris | So |
| OL | 55 | Jacob Homa | So |
| WR | 81 | Denver Johnson | Fr |
| OL | 69 | Kory Kodanko | Fr |
| RB | 23 | Clifford Kwaw-Mensah | Fr |
| OL | 76 | Jamison Lalk | Sr |
| QB | 7 | Joel Lanning | So |
| OL | 50 | Bryan Larson | So |
| WR | 5 | Allen Lazard | So |
| WR | 14 | Darius Lee-Campbell | Fr |
| WR | 84 | Jake Lemming | So |
| WR | 82 | Kenneth Lynn | Sr |
| OL | 54 | Jack McAllister | Fr |
| WR | 83 | Brett Medders | Sr |
| OL | 74 | Bryce Meeker | Fr |
| WR | 8 | D'Vario Montgomery | Jr |
| OL | 77 | Oni Omoile | Sr |
| OL | 56 | Jaypee Philbert Jr. | So |
| WR, LS | 3 | Jake Rhoads | So |
| WR | 16 | Wyatt Rhoads | Fr |
| QB | 12 | Sam B. Richardson | Sr |
| QB | 19 | Josh Ringelberg | Fr |
| QB | 3 | Grant Rohach | Jr |
| WR | 19 | Trever Ryen | So |
| WR | 21 | Orion Salters | Fr |
| TE | 11 | Scotty Schaffner | Fr |
| OL | 53 | Patrick Scoggins | Jr |
| OL | 68 | Brian Seda | Jr |
| OL | 71 | Nick Severs | So |
| QB | 16 | Kyle Starcevich | Fr |
| OL | 78 | Wendell Taiese | Sr |
| RB | 1 | Joshua Thomas | Fr |
| RB | 2 | Mike Warren | Fr |
| RB | 20 | Justin Webster | So |
| WR | 10 | Jauan Wesley | So |
| WR | 17 | Quan West | Jr |
| OL | 73 | Will Windham | Fr |

Defense

| Pos. | # | Name | Class |
|---|---|---|---|
| DT | 91 | Pierre Aka | Jr |
| DT | 52 | Terry Ayeni | Jr |
| DE | 59 | Trey Benson | Fr |
| DE | 42 | Spencer Benton | Fr |
| DB | 22 | Jack Bergstrom | Fr |
| LB | 48 | Jason Bowman | Fr |
| DT | 92 | Adam Bradley | So |
| DE | 65 | Nate Cave | So |
| DT | 56 | Josh Coleman | Fr |
| DB | 23 | Darian Cotton | Sr |
| DB | 5 | Kamari Cotton-Moya | So |
| DT | 94 | Devlyn Cousin | Jr |
| DT | 75 | Breion Creer | Jr |
| DE | 37 | Keenan Davis | Jr |
| DB | 7 | Qujuan Floyd | Sr |
| DT | 95 | Robby Garcia | So |
| DE | 43 | Sam George | So |
| LB | 40 | Jared Gescheidler | Fr |
| LB | 2 | Jordan Harris | Jr |
| LB | 16 | Willie Harvey Jr. | Fr |
| DB | 1 | Vic Holmes | Fr |
| DE | 80 | Vince Horras | Fr |
| DB | 31 | Josh Jahlas | Jr |
| DB | 3 | Mike Johnson | Fr |
| DB | 12 | Jamor Jones | Jr |
| LB | 21 | Luke Knott | Jr |
| LB | 53 | Anthony Lazard | Jr |
| DT | 36 | Bobby Leath | Jr |
| DE | 11 | Gabe Luna | Jr |
| DE | 32 | Justin Madison | So |
| LB | 44 | Bobby McMillen | Fr |
| DE | 90 | Mitchell Meyers | Jr |
| LB | 25 | Brian Mills | So |
| DE | 7 | Seth Nerness | Fr |
| LB | 9 | Reggan Northrup | Fr |
| DB | 10 | Brian Peavy | Fr |
| LB | 35 | Levi Peters | Jr |
| DT | 96 | Ma'Kayle Phillips | So |
| DB | 13 | Stephon Pickett-Brown | Fr |
| DE | 45 | Dale Pierson | Sr |
| DB | 24 | Jamaal Richardson | Fr |
| DB | 4 | Sam E. Richardson | Sr |
| DB | 6 | De'Monte Ruth | Fr |
| DE | 93 | Hiro Sasaki | Jr |
| DT | 64 | Scott Schilb | So |
| LB | 29 | Kane Seeley | Jr |
| LB | 47 | Sam Seonbuchner | Fr |
| LB | 42 | Marcel Spears Jr. | Fr |
| LB | 49 | Jack Spreen | So |
| DB | 20 | Matt Swoyer | Jr |
| DE | 98 | Trent Taylor | Sr |
| DT | 99 | Vernell Trent | So |
| DB | 34 | Nigel Tribune | Jr |
| DT | 97 | Demond Tucker | Jr |
| DE | 55 | J.D. Waggoner | So |
| DB | 15 | Jordan Wallace | Fr |
| DE | 41 | Darius White | Jr |
| DB | 17 | Jomal Wiltz | Jr |

Special teams

| Pos. | # | Name | Class |
|---|---|---|---|
| P | 13 | Colin Downing | So |
| H | 34 | Austin Fischer | Sr |
| PK | 41 | Chris Francis | Fr |
| P | 12 | Holden Kramer | So |
| PK | 1 | Cole Netten | Jr |
| PK | 38 | Peyton Paddock | Fr |
| PK | 90 | Hunter Sickels | Fr |
| LS | 51 | Tanner Tusha | Jr |

Head coach

- Paul Rhoads

Coordinators/assistant coaches

- Lou Ayeni
- Brandon Blaney
- Shane Burnham
- Wally Burnham
- Shane Dowty
- Stan Eggen
- Derek Hoodjer
- Maurice Linguist
- Mark Mangino
- Tommy Mangino
- Ryan Olson
- Clayton Oster
- Reece Petty
- Todd Sturdy

Legend

- (C) Team captain
- (S) Suspended
- (I) Ineligible
- Injured
- Redshirt

Roster
Last update: 2016-Jan-02

== Awards and honors ==
=== National Team of the Week ===
Following the 24–0 shutout of Texas on the weekend of October 31, the 2015 Iowa State football team received the AutoNation National Team of the Week by the Football Writers Association of America (FWAA).

This was its third shutout over a Big 12 opponent in school history, the previous against Kansas 34–0 on November 23, 2013. The Cyclones gained 426 yards in total offensive while the defense allowed only 204 yards, which is the third-lowest total an ISU defense has allowed vs. a Big 12 opponent in school history. Also, this was the fewest yards allowed vs. a FBS team in the Paul Rhoads era. The dominating ISU defense held Texas to nine plays in ISU territory with seven of these on Texas's final drive.

This was Texas’s first shutout loss against an unranked team since November 18, 1961, when TCU shutout #1 ranked Texas 6–0.

For Iowa State, Mike Warren, the nation’s best freshman rusher, picked up 157 yards on the ground on 32 carries and added the first ISU touchdown, the fourth-best rookie rushing effort in school history. Joel Lanning got his first career start at quarterback, rushing for 64 yards and completing 19 of 37 passes for 188 yards with a touchdown pass to Dondre Daley and no interceptions. Freshman Joshua Thomas punched in the third ISU touchdown, his sixth of the season, tying a Cyclone freshman record set by Alexander Robinson in 2007.

This was the Cyclones first home win over the Longhorns in six tries.

=== Walter Camp National Defensive Player of the Week ===
Jordan Harris was honored as the Walter Camp National Defensive Player of the Week for games ending October 31, 2015. Harris's seven tackles and one interception led the Cyclones crushing shutout of Texas 24–0. Jordan is the third Cyclone to receive National Player of the Week honors: WR Todd Blythe on October 30, 2005, and LB Jesse Smith on October 25, 2009.
