= AutoNation National Team of the Week =

Tostitos Fiesta Bowl National Team of the Week
- Awarded for: weekly award given by the Football Writers Association of America (FWAA) to an American College Football team to honor that team's win and performance
- Country: United States
- Presented by: Football Writers Association of America

History
- First award: August 31, 2002

The AutoNation National Team of the Week is a weekly award given by the Football Writers Association of America (FWAA) to an American College Football team to honor that team's win and performance. Beginning in 2002, the members of the FWAA began naming a National Team of the Week. In 2004, the award first started being sponsored by the Tostitos Fiesta Bowl. In 2014, Big Game replaced Tostitos Fiesta Bowl as the presenting sponsor for the National Team of the Week. In 2015, AutoNation became the presenting sponsor.

Members of the FWAA board of directors and All-America committee decide the weekly honor. Each Monday during the college football regular season at 4pm ET, the FWAA will name the AutoNation National Team of the Week.

The very first recipient of the award was Duke, following their 23–16 victory over East Carolina to open the 2002 season, which ended the Blue Devils' 23-game losing streak. Since then, four teams have been given the honor at least three times, the most of any teams: Miami, Michigan State, Notre Dame, and Southern California. Only one team, Miami, has received the award twice in one season (2002), and only once has the award been shared amongst two teams (Texas and Oklahoma State in 2008).

== Award recipients ==
Year	Date	Team
2002	Aug. 31	Duke
	Sept. 7	Miami (Fla.)
	Sept. 14	California
	Sept. 21	Florida
	Sept. 28	Iowa State
	Oct. 5	Ole Miss
	Oct. 12	Miami (Fla.)
	Oct. 19	Arizona State
	Oct. 26	Notre Dame
	Nov. 2	Boston College
	Nov. 9	Texas A&M
	Nov. 16	Texas Tech
	Nov. 23	Ohio State
2003	Aug. 30	Southern Cal
	Sept. 6	Wake Forest
	Sept. 13	Arkansas
	Sept. 20	Marshall
	Sept. 27	California
	Oct. 6	Baylor
	Oct. 13	Oklahoma
	Oct. 20	Florida
	Oct. 27	West Virginia
	Nov. 3	Virginia Tech
	Nov. 10	Clemson
	Nov. 17	Kansas State
	Nov. 24	Michigan
2004	Sept. 4	Rutgers
	Sept. 11	Fresno State
	Sept. 18	Auburn
	Sept. 25	Navy
	Oct. 2	Northwestern
	Oct. 9	Army
	Oct. 16	Wisconsin
	Oct. 23	Mississippi State
	Oct. 30	North Carolina
	Nov. 6	Notre Dame
	Nov. 13	Michigan State
	Nov. 20	Utah
	Nov. 27	Syracuse
2005	Sept. 3	Texas Christian
	Sept. 10	Michigan State
	Sept. 17	Arkansas
	Sept. 24	South Florida
	Oct. 1	Alabama
	Oct. 8	Penn State
	Oct. 15	Southern Cal
	Oct. 22	Northwestern
	Oct. 29	South Carolina
	Nov. 5	Miami
	Nov. 12	Clemson
	Nov. 19	Georgia Tech
	Nov. 26	Nevada
2006	Sept. 2	Southern Cal
	Sept. 9	Tennessee
	Sept. 16	Michigan
	Sept. 23	Notre Dame
	Sept. 30	Georgia Tech
	Oct. 14	Indiana
	Oct. 21	Michigan STate
	Oct. 28	Oregon State
	Nov. 4	Louisville
	Nov. 11	Rutgers
	Nov. 18	Cincinnati
	Nov. 25	Texas A&M
2007	Sept. 1	Appalachian State
	Sept. 8	South Florida
	Sept. 15	Iowa State
	Sept. 22	Kentucky
	Sept. 29	Kansas State
	Oct. 6	Stanford
	Oct. 13	Oregon State
	Oct. 20	Vanderbilt
	Oct. 27	Kansas
	Nov. 3	Navy
	Nov. 10	Illinois
	Nov. 17	Indiana
	Nov. 24	Missouri
2008	Aug. 30	Alabama
	Sept. 6	East Carolina
	Sept. 13	Southern Cal
	Sept. 20	Boise State
	Sept. 27	Oregon State
	Oct. 4	Vanderbilt
	Oct. 11	Texas and Oklahoma State
	Oct. 18	Texas Christian
	Oct. 25	Penn State
	Nov. 1	Texas Tech
	Nov. 8	Iowa
	Nov. 15	Houston
	Nov. 22	Oklahoma
	Nov. 29	Kansas
2009	Sept. 5	BYU
	Sept. 12	Houston
	Sept. 19	Washington
	Sept. 26	South Florida
	Oct. 3	UTEP
	Oct. 10	Florida
	Oct. 17	Purdue
	Oct. 24	TCU
	Oct. 31	Oregon
	Nov. 7	Northwestern
	Nov. 14	Stanford
	Nov. 21	Connecticut
	Nov. 28	Georgia
2010	Sept. 4	Boise State
	Sept. 11	Oklahoma
	Sept. 18	Arizona
	Sept. 25	UCLA
	Oct. 2	Michigan State
	Oct. 9	South Carolina
	Oct. 16	Wisconsin
	Oct. 23	Missouri
	Oct. 30	Iowa
	Nov. 6	TCU
	Nov. 13	Northwestern
	Nov. 20	Texas A&M
	Nov. 27	Nevada
2015	Nov. 2	Iowa State

== See also ==
- Grantland Rice Award
