= 2015 Texas Longhorns football team =

American college football season

2015 Texas Longhorns football
- Conference: Big 12 Conference
- Record: 5–7 (4–5 Big 12)
- Head coach: Charlie Strong (2nd season)
- Offensive coordinator: Joe Wickline (2nd season)
- Co-offensive coordinator: Jay Norvell (1st season)
- Offensive scheme: Spread
- Defensive coordinator: Vance Bedford (2nd season)
- Base defense: 3–3–5
- Home stadium: Darrell K Royal–Texas Memorial Stadium

2015 Big 12 Conference football standings
	Conf.			Overall
Team	W		L	W		L
No. 5 Oklahoma $^	8	–	1	11	–	2
No. 20 Oklahoma State	7	–	2	10	–	3
No. 7 TCU	7	–	2	11	–	2
No. 13 Baylor	6	–	3	10	–	3
West Virginia	4	–	5	8	–	5
Texas Tech	4	–	5	7	–	6
Texas	4	–	5	5	–	7
Kansas State	3	–	6	6	–	7
Iowa State	2	–	7	3	–	9
Kansas	0	–	9	0	–	12
^ – College Football Playoff participant; $ – Conference champion; Rankings from AP Poll

The 2015 Texas Longhorns football team, known variously as "Texas", "UT", the "Longhorns", or the "Horns", was a collegiate American football team that represented the University of Texas at Austin as a member of the Big 12 Conference in the 2015 NCAA Division I FBS football season. The team played its home games at Darrell K Royal–Texas Memorial Stadium in Austin, Texas, where the team is based. The Longhorns were led by second-year head coach Charlie Strong. Shawn Watson and Joe Wickline ran the offense. Vance Bedford served as defensive coordinator. They finished the season 5–7, 4–5 in Big 12 play to finish in a three-way tie for fifth place.

== Preseason ==
In 2014, first-year head coach Charlie Strong led the Texas Longhorns to a 6–7 record, including a 5–4 record in conference play and a 7–31 loss against Arkansas in the 2014 Texas Bowl. In the aftermath of the bowl game, Strong described it as well as a 10–48 loss to TCU a month prior an "embarrassment to the program" and stated that a competition between players for the quarterback position as well as other positions was needed to improve the team as a whole after quarterback Tyrone Swoopes received heavy criticism following the game. On December 31, 2014, then-tight ends coach Bruce Chambers and wide receivers coach Les Koenning were released from their coaching duties. Bruce Chambers had been the only coach to have been retained following Charlie Strong's hire earlier in 2014. On January 16, 2015, the Longhorns hired former Oklahoma wide receivers coach Jay Norvell to the same position at Texas. Norvell had been fired from Oklahoma earlier that month following the fallout from the 2014 Russell Athletic Bowl.

On February 6, less than two days after National Signing Day, defensive-line coach Chris Rumph left Texas to coach the same position at the Florida Gators after just one season with the Longhorns. A week later, Texas hired Brick Haley and Jeff Traylor to fill the team's coaching vacancies at the defensive-line and tight end. Haley was the defensive-line coach at LSU at the time of hire and had previously coached the same position with the Chicago Bears, Mississippi State, and several other schools. Traylor was previously a 15-year head coach at Gilmer High School, where he amassed three state championship titles.

== Recruiting ==
A total of 28 players pledged non-binding commitments to the 2015 Texas Longhorns football team during the 2015 recruiting cycle. However, these players would not officially become part of the team until they signed their National Letter of Intent on National Signing Day, which occurred on February 4, 2015. However, junior college recruits could sign earlier, and as a result all three of Texas' junior college prospects signed their letters of intent on December 17, 2014 and became the first recruits to sign on the Longhorns' 2015 recruiting class. Six players joined the Longhorns as early enrollees, meaning that they would be able to train with the team during the spring of 2015. One player did not sign with the team and instead elected to grayshirt, meaning that they would not be officially part of the team or receive financial aid from the athletic department until the spring semester of 2016 (on August 7, 2015, after more scholarships became available, Merrick was offered an immediate full scholarship). The first player to commit was offensive guard Patrick Vahe, who committed on July 28, 2013. Three commits came from a players in either junior or community colleges, while the rest came from high schools.

Of Texas' 29 commitments, 14 were listed on the ESPN 300, which lists the 300 top recruiting prospects nationwide according to the network's metrics. According to ESPN, Rivals.com, Scout.com, and 247Sports.com, linebacker Malik Jefferson was the Longhorns' highest rated prospect; Jefferson was considered the third best linebacker nationwide and fifth best prospect overall in Texas. Three players announced their commitments to Texas at two nationally televised high school all-star games, including one at the 2015 Under Armour All-America Game held on January 2, 2015 and two from the 2015 US Army All-American Bowl held the following day. Among Texas' recruits in 2015 were a group of five players from Florida who visited Texas in 2014 as they played West Virginia in Austin. Given the moniker of the "Florida Five", the five—Cecil Cherry, Devonaire Clarington, Davante Davis, Tim Irvin, and Gilbert Johnson—were heavily sought after during the recruiting process and were all eventually committed to Texas by January 4, 2015. However, Tim Irvin would decommit from Texas on January 18 and Gilbert Johnson was unable to gain academic eligibility for The University of Texas. Throughout the recruiting process, five players revoked their former Texas-commit status. However, one recruit, John Burt, recommitted to Texas on January 26, 2015.

Texas' 2015 recruiting class was ranked 9th, 12th, 7th, and 10th by ESPN, Rivals.com, Scout.com, and 247Sports.com, respectively. These rankings also placed Texas as having the best recruiting class in the Big 12 Conference.

=== Recruits ===
College recruiting information (2015)
Name	Hometown	School	Height	Weight	40^{‡}	Commit date
Kris Boyd; CB	Gilmer, Texas	Gilmer HS	6 ft 0 in (1.83 m)	182 lb (83 kg)	4.48	January 30, 2015
Kris Boyd; CB	Recruit ratings: Scout: Rivals: 247Sports: (81)					
John Burt; WR	Tallahassee, Florida	Lincoln HS	6 ft 3 in (1.91 m)	180 lb (82 kg)	–	January 26, 2015
John Burt; WR	Recruit ratings: Scout: Rivals: 247Sports: (81)					
Cecil Cherry; MLB	Lakeland, Florida	Victory Christian Academy	6 ft 0 in (1.83 m)	231 lb (105 kg)	–	December 15, 2014
Cecil Cherry; MLB	Recruit ratings: Scout: Rivals: 247Sports: (78)					
Devonaire Clarington; TE	Miami, Florida	Booker T. Washington HS	6 ft 6 in (1.98 m)	224 lb (102 kg)	–	January 3, 2015
Devonaire Clarington; TE	Recruit ratings: Scout: Rivals: 247Sports: (84)					
Davante Davis; CB	Miami, Florida	Booker T. Washington HS	6 ft 2 in (1.88 m)	189 lb (86 kg)	–	January 1, 2015
Davante Davis; CB	Recruit ratings: Scout: Rivals: 247Sports: (81)					
DeShon Elliott; S	Rockwall, Texas	Rockwall-Heath HS	6 ft 2 in (1.88 m)	204 lb (93 kg)	4.51	March 18, 2014
DeShon Elliott; S	Recruit ratings: Scout: Rivals: 247Sports: (83)					
Breckyn Hager; MLB	Austin, Texas	Westlake HS	6 ft 3 in (1.91 m)	213 lb (97 kg)	–	September 24, 2014
Breckyn Hager; MLB	Recruit ratings: Scout: Rivals: 247Sports: (74)					
Holton Hill; CB	Houston, Texas	Lamar HS	6 ft 2 in (1.88 m)	181 lb (82 kg)	4.62	January 30, 2015
Holton Hill; CB	Recruit ratings: Scout: Rivals: 247Sports: (82)					
Brandon Hodges; OT	Aberdeen, Mississippi	East Mississippi CC	6 ft 5 in (1.96 m)	300 lb (140 kg)	–	–
Brandon Hodges; OT	Recruit ratings: Scout: Rivals: 247Sports: (79)					
Tristian Houston; HB	Houston, Texas	North Shore HS	5 ft 10 in (1.78 m)	198 lb (90 kg)	–	April 14, 2014
Tristian Houston; HB	Recruit ratings: Scout: Rivals: 247Sports: (81)					
Malik Jefferson; OLB	Mesquite, Texas	Poteet HS	6 ft 3 in (1.91 m)	217 lb (98 kg)	4.39	December 19, 2014
Malik Jefferson; OLB	Recruit ratings: Scout: Rivals: 247Sports: (87)					
Gilbert Johnson; WR	Homestead, Florida	Georgia Prep Sports Academy	6 ft 3 in (1.91 m)	193 lb (88 kg)	–	Jan 4, 2015
Gilbert Johnson; WR	Recruit ratings: Scout: Rivals: 247Sports: (75)					
Kirk Johnson; RB	San Jose, California	Valley Christian HS	6 ft 0 in (1.83 m)	195 lb (88 kg)	–	April 17, 2014
Kirk Johnson; RB	Recruit ratings: Scout: Rivals: 247Sports: (80)					
Du'Vonta Lampkin; DT	Houston, Texas	Cypress Falls HS	6 ft 4 in (1.93 m)	300 lb (140 kg)	–	July 28, 2014
Du'Vonta Lampkin; DT	Recruit ratings: Scout: Rivals: 247Sports: (79)					
P. J. Locke; S	Beaumont, Texas	Central HS	5 ft 10 in (1.78 m)	188 lb (85 kg)	–	February 4, 2015
P. J. Locke; S	Recruit ratings: Scout: Rivals: 247Sports: (79)					
Kai Locksley; ATH	Baltimore, Maryland	Gilman School	6 ft 4 in (1.93 m)	188 lb (85 kg)	–	February 4, 2015
Kai Locksley; ATH	Recruit ratings: Scout: Rivals: 247Sports: (80)					
Ronnie Major; OT	Huntsville, Texas	Huntsville HS	6 ft 6 in (1.98 m)	290 lb (130 kg)	–	February 22, 2014
Ronnie Major; OT	Recruit ratings: Scout: Rivals: 247Sports: (80)					
DeAndre McNeal; ATH	Mesquite, Texas	Poteet HS	6 ft 2 in (1.88 m)	212 lb (96 kg)	–	December 19, 2014
DeAndre McNeal; ATH	Recruit ratings: Scout: Rivals: 247Sports: (80)					
Matthew Merrick; QB	Irving, Texas	Cistercian Preparatory	6 ft 2 in (1.88 m)	186 lb (84 kg)	–	November 21, 2014
Matthew Merrick; QB	Recruit ratings: Rivals: 247Sports: (78)					
Ryan Newsome; WR	Aledo, Texas	Aledo HS	5 ft 8 in (1.73 m)	170 lb (77 kg)	4.5	Feb 4, 2015
Ryan Newsome; WR	Recruit ratings: Scout: Rivals: 247Sports: (82)					
Tristan Nickelson; OT	League City, Texas	Navarro College	6 ft 8 in (2.03 m)	309 lb (140 kg)	–	November 8, 2014
Tristan Nickelson; OT	Recruit ratings: Scout: Rivals: 247Sports: (74)					
Charles Omenihu; DE	Rowlett, Texas	Rowlett HS	6 ft 5 in (1.96 m)	223 lb (101 kg)	–	February 24, 2014
Charles Omenihu; DE	Recruit ratings: Scout: Rivals: 247Sports: (78)					
Garrett Thomas; OT	Many, Louisiana	Many HS	6 ft 6 in (1.98 m)	308 lb (140 kg)	–	July 9, 2014
Garrett Thomas; OT	Recruit ratings: Scout: Rivals: 247Sports: (80)					
Cameron Townsend; LB	Missouri City, Texas	Ridge Point HS	6 ft 1 in (1.85 m)	202 lb (92 kg)	–	October 26, 2014
Cameron Townsend; LB	Recruit ratings: Scout: Rivals: 247Sports: (80)					
Patrick Vahe; OG	Euless, Texas	Trinity HS	6 ft 3 in (1.91 m)	296 lb (134 kg)	–	July 28, 2013
Patrick Vahe; OG	Recruit ratings: Scout: Rivals: 247Sports: (82)					
Quincer Vasser; DE	Nyack, New York	Navarro College	6 ft 4 in (1.93 m)	264 lb (120 kg)	–	December 3, 2014
Quincer Vasser; DE	Recruit ratings: Scout: Rivals: 247Sports: (78)					
Chris Warren III; RB	Rockwall, Texas	Rockwall HS	6 ft 2 in (1.88 m)	230 lb (100 kg)	–	Feb 4, 2015
Chris Warren III; RB	Recruit ratings: Scout: Rivals: 247Sports: (83)					
Anthony Wheeler; MLB	Dallas, Texas	Skyline HS	6 ft 2 in (1.88 m)	223 lb (101 kg)	–	January 2, 2015
Anthony Wheeler; MLB	Recruit ratings: Scout: Rivals: 247Sports: (84)					
Connor Williams; OT	Coppell, Texas	Coppell HS	6 ft 5 in (1.96 m)	273 lb (124 kg)	–	September 4, 2014
Connor Williams; OT	Recruit ratings: Scout: Rivals: 247Sports: (78)					
Overall recruit ranking: Scout: 8 Rivals: 13 247Sports: 11 ESPN: 7
‡ Refers to 40-yard dash; Note: In many cases, Scout, Rivals, 247Sports, On3, and ESPN may conflict in their listings of height, weight and 40 time.; In these cases, the average was taken. ESPN grades are on a 100-point scale.; Sources: "2015 Texas Football Commitment List". Rivals.; "Texas College Football Recruiting Commits (2015)". Scout.; "2015 Texas Longhorns Recruiting Class". ESPN.; "Scout.com Team Recruiting Rankings". Scout.; "2015 Team Ranking". Rivals.com.; "2015 Texas Football Commits". 247Sports.

== Personnel ==
=== Roster ===
2015 Texas Longhorns football team roster
Players
Coaches
Offense

Pos.	#	Name	Class
WR	1	John Burt	Fr
WR	3	Armanti Foreman	So
WR	4	Daje Johnson	Sr
WR	5	Lorenzo Joe	So
WR	6	DeAndre McNeal	Fr
WR	7	Marcus Johnson	Sr
WR	8	Dorian Leonard	So
QB	9	Josh Covey	Fr
WR	11	Jacorey Warrick	Jr
QB	13	Jerrod Heard	Fr
QB	14	Kai Locksley	Fr
QB	15	Trey Holtz	Jr
QB	16	Logan Vinklarek	So
QB	17	Jimmy Greenwood	So
WR	17	Ryan Newsome	Fr
QB	18	Tyrone Swoopes	Jr
QB	19	Matthew Merrick	Fr
RB	25	Chris Warren III	Fr
WR	27	Roderick Bernard	So
WR	27	Connor Huffman	So
RB	28	Kirk Johnson	Fr
WR	29	Hunter DeGroot	Jr
RB	30	Tim Yoder	Fr
RB	32	Johnathan Gray	Sr
RB	33	D'Onta Foreman	So
TE	36	Alex De La Torre	Sr
RB	39	Gaston Davis	Jr
RB	40	Trenton Hafley	Fr
RB	41	Tristian Houston	Fr
TE	42	Caleb Bluiett	Jr
TE	42	Jay Harper	Fr
TE	43	Logan Mills	Sr
TE	47	Andrew Beck	So
FB	48	Dominic Cruciani	Sr
C	50	Jake Raulerson	So
OL	51	Terrell Cuney	Fr
OL	54	Garrett Graf	So
OL	55	Connor Williams	Fr
OL	57	Clark Orren	Jr
OL	58	Brandon Hodges	Jr
OL	59	Michael Welsh	Fr
OL	63	Alex Anderson	Fr
OL	65	Marcus Hutchins	Sr
G	66	Sedrick Flowers	Sr
OL	68	Frank Lopez	So
OL	69	Austin Allsup	Fr
OL	70	Buck Major	Fr
OL	72	Elijah Rodriguez	Fr
C, G	74	Taylor Doyle	Sr
OT	75	Tristan Nickelson	So
G, OT	76	Kent Perkins	Jr
OL	77	Patrick Vahe	Fr
OL	79	Garrett Thomas	Fr
TE	80	Blake Whiteley	So
WR	81	Ryan Roberts	So
WR	82	Michael Wilson	Fr
TE	83	Matt Center	So
WR	85	Philipp Moeller	Fr
WR	86	Jake Oliver	So
TE	87	Garrett Gray	Fr
WR	88	Ty Templin	Jr
TE	89	Chris Fehr	Fr

Defense

Pos.	#	Name	Class
DE	1	Shiro Davis	Sr
CB	2	Kris Boyd	Fr
S	4	DeShon Elliott	Fr
DB	5	Holton Hill	Fr
DB	9	Davante Davis	Fr
S	11	P. J. Locke	Fr
S	14	Dylan Haines	Jr
CB	15	Bryson Echols	Jr
DB	16	Jermaine Roberts, Jr.	Fr
S	18	Kevin Vacarro	Jr
LB	19	Peter Jinkens	Sr
CB	21	Duke Thomas	Sr
DB	23	Jordan Strickland	Fr
CB	24	John Bonney	Fr
CB	25	Antwuan Davis	So
S	26	Adrian Colbert	Jr
CB	29	Sheroid Evans	Sr
LB	30	Timothy Cole	Jr
S	31	Jason Hall	So
LB	35	Edwin Freeman	Fr
DB	36	Dillon Boldt	Jr
LB	37	Johnny Tseng	Jr
DB	38	Tyler Lee	Jr
DB	39	Tyler Marriott	Sr
DE	40	Naashon Hughes	So
LB	43	Cameron Townsend	Fr
LB	44	Breckyn Hager	Fr
LB	45	Anthony Wheeler	Fr
LB	46	Malik Jefferson	Fr
LB	48	Trey Gonzales	Sr
DE	49	Derick Roberson	Fr
LB	55	Dalton Santos	Sr
DT	61	Alex Mercado	Jr
DT	62	Patrick Ojeaga	Fr
DE	90	Charles Omenihu	Fr
DE	91	Bryce Cottrell	Jr
DE	92	Quincy Vasser	Jr
DT	93	Paul Boytette, Jr.	Jr
DT	94	Alex Norman	Jr
DT	95	Poona Ford	So
DT	96	Jake McMillon	Fr
DT	97	Chris Nelson	Fr
DT	98	Hassan Ridgeway	Jr
DT	99	Desmond Jackson	Sr

Special teams

Pos.	#	Name	Class
P	13	Michael Dickson	Fr
PK	23	Nick Rose	Sr
PK	28	Nick Jordan	Jr
PK	35	Jon Coppens	Fr
PK	37	Evan Moore	Fr
P	38	Mitchell Becker	So
DS	41	Kyle Ashby	Jr
P	49	Matthew Sims	So
DS	53	Jak Holbrook	Fr

Head coach

- Charlie Strong (2nd year head coach)

Coordinators/assistant coaches

- Vance Bedford (2nd year defensive coordinator/secondary)
- Brick Haley (1st year defensive line)
- Brian Jean-Mary (2nd year linebackers coach/recruiting coordinator)
- Jay Norvell (1st year wide receivers coach)
- Tommie Robinson (2nd year running backs coach)
- Jeff Traylor (1st year tight ends/special teams coordinator)
- Chris Vaughn (2nd year defensive backs coach)
- Shawn Watson (2nd year assistant head for offense/quarterbacks coach)
- Joe Wickline (2nd year offensive coordinator/offensive line coach)

Legend

- (C) Team captain
- (S) Suspended
- (I) Ineligible
- Injured
- Redshirt

Roster
Last update: September 23, 2015

== Schedule ==
Date	Time	Opponent	Site	TV	Result	Attendance
September 5	6:30 p.m.	at No. 11 Notre Dame*	Notre Dame Stadium; Notre Dame, IN	NBC	L 3–38	80,795
September 12	7:00 p.m.	Rice*	Darrell K Royal–Texas Memorial Stadium; Austin, TX (rivalry)	LHN	W 42–28	86,458
September 19	7:30 p.m.	California*	Darrell K Royal–Texas Memorial Stadium; Austin, TX	FOX	L 44–45	91,568
September 26	2:30 p.m.	No. 24 Oklahoma State	Darrell K Royal–Texas Memorial Stadium; Austin, TX	ESPN	L 27–30	87,073
October 3	11:00 a.m.	at No. 4 TCU	Amon G. Carter Stadium; Fort Worth, TX (rivalry)	ABC	L 7–50	48,694
October 10	11:00 a.m.	vs. No. 10 Oklahoma	Cotton Bowl; Dallas, TX (Red River Rivalry)	ABC	W 24–17	91,546
October 24	11:00 a.m.	Kansas State	Darrell K Royal–Texas Memorial Stadium; Austin, TX	FS1	W 23–9	88,283
October 31	6:00 p.m.	at Iowa State	Jack Trice Stadium; Ames, IA	FS1	L 0–24	53,616
November 7	7:00 p.m.	Kansas^{†}	Darrell K Royal–Texas Memorial Stadium; Austin, TX	LHN	W 59–20	92,529
November 14	11:00 a.m.	at West Virginia	Mountaineer Field; Morgantown, WV	ESPNU	L 20–38	56,736
November 26	6:30 p.m.	Texas Tech	Darrell K Royal–Texas Memorial Stadium; Austin, TX (Chancellor's Spurs)	FS1	L 45–48	94,299
December 5	11:00 a.m.	at No. 12 Baylor	McLane Stadium; Waco, TX (rivalry)	ESPN	W 23–17	48,093
*Non-conference game; ^{†}Homecoming; Rankings from AP Poll released prior to game; All times are in Central time

== Game summaries ==
=== At Notre Dame ===
Texas at Notre Dame

Team	1	2	3	4	Total
Longhorns	0	0	3	0	3
• #11 Fighting Irish	14	3	14	7	38

- Date: September 5
- Location: Notre Dame Stadium
  Notre Dame, Indiana
- Game start: 6:30 p.m. CST
- Elapsed time: 3:11
- Game attendance: 80,795
- Game weather: 82 °F (28 °C) • Wind E 3 mph (4.8 km/h) • Weather: Clear & Humid
- Referee: Mike Defee
- TV announcers (NBC): Dan Hicks and Doug Flutie

=== Vs. Rice ===
Rice at Texas

Team	1	2	3	4	Total
Owls	0	14	0	14	28
• Longhorns	21	0	21	0	42

- Date: September 12
- Location: Darrell K Royal–Texas Memorial Stadium
  Austin, Texas
- Game start: 7:05 p.m. CST
- Elapsed time: 3:05
- Game attendance: 86,458
- Referee: Brad Van Vark
- Television network: LHN

=== Vs. California ===
Cal at Texas

Team	1	2	3	4	Total
• Golden Bears	7	17	21	0	45
Longhorns	7	17	0	20	44

- Date: September 19
- Location: Darren K Royal–Texas Memorial Stadium
  Austin, Texas
- Game start: 6:35 p.m. CST
- Elapsed time: 3:53
- Game attendance: 91,568
- Referee: Mark Duddy
- Television network: FOX

=== Vs. Oklahoma State ===
Oklahoma State at Texas

Team	1	2	3	4	Total
• Cowboys	14	3	7	6	30
Longhorns	6	14	7	0	27

- Date: September 26
- Location: Darren K Royal–Texas Memorial Stadium
  Austin, Texas
- Game start: 2:30 p.m. CST
- Elapsed time: 3:39
- Game attendance: 87,073
- Referee: Names Withheld
- Television network: ESPN

=== At TCU ===
Texas at TCU

Team	1	2	3	4	Total
Longhorns	0	0	0	7	7
• Horned Frogs	30	7	10	3	50

- Date: October 3
- Location: Amon G. Carter Stadium
  Fort Worth, Texas
- Game start: 11:00 a.m. CST
- Elapsed time: 3:30
- Game attendance: 48,694
- Referee: Dan Romeo
- Television network: ABC

=== Vs. Oklahoma ===
Texas vs Oklahoma

Team	1	2	3	4	Total
Sooners	0	3	7	7	17
• Longhorns	14	0	3	7	24

- Date: October 10
- Location: Cotton Bowl
  Dallas, Texas
- Game start: 11:07 a.m. CST
- Elapsed time: 3:12
- Game attendance: 91,546
- Referee: Cooper Castleberry
- Television network: ABC

=== Vs. Kansas State ===
Kansas State at Texas

Team	1	2	3	4	Total
Wildcats	0	6	3	0	9
• Longhorns	3	13	0	7	23

- Date: October 24
- Location: Darrell K Royal–Texas Memorial Stadium
  Austin, Texas
- Game start: 11:06 a.m. CST
- Elapsed time: 3:18
- Game attendance: 88,283
- Referee: Eddy Shelton
- Television network: FS1

=== At Iowa State ===
Texas at Iowa State

Team	1	2	3	4	Total
Longhorns	0	0	0	0	0
• Cyclones	7	3	7	7	24

- Date: October 31
- Location: Jack Trice Stadium
  Ames, Iowa
- Game start: 6:10 p.m. CST
- Elapsed time: 3:08
- Game attendance: 53,616
- Referee: Dan Romeo
- Television network: FS1

=== Vs. Kansas ===
Kansas at Texas

Team	1	2	3	4	Total
Jayhawks	7	7	0	6	20
• Longhorns	17	7	14	21	59

- Date: November 7
- Location: Darrell K Royal–Texas Memorial Stadium
  Austin, Texas
- Game start: 7:06 p.m. CST
- Elapsed time: 3:35
- Game attendance: 92,529
- Referee: Mike Defee
- Television network: LHN

=== At West Virginia ===
Texas at West Virginia

Team	1	2	3	4	Total
Longhorns	10	0	7	3	20
• Mountaineers	7	14	7	10	38

- Date: November 14
- Location: Mountaineer Field
  Morgantown, West Virginia
- Game start: 11:01 a.m. CST
- Elapsed time: 3:06
- Game attendance: 56,736
- Referee: Brad Van Vark
- Television network: ESPNU

=== Vs. Texas Tech ===
Texas Tech at Texas

Team	1	2	3	4	Total
• Red Raiders	0	17	10	21	48
Longhorns	0	10	14	21	45

- Date: November 26
- Location: Darrell K Royal–Texas Memorial Stadium
  Austin, Texas
- Game start: 6:35 p.m. CST
- Elapsed time: 3:50
- Game attendance: 94,299
- Game weather: 72 °F (22 °C), light rain
- Referee: Cooper Castleberry
- Television network: FS1

=== At Baylor ===
Texas at Baylor

Team	1	2	3	4	Total
• Longhorns	17	3	0	3	23
Bears	0	0	10	7	17

- Date: December 5
- Location: McLane Stadium
  Waco, Texas
- Game start: 11:01 a.m. CST
- Elapsed time: 3:32
- Game attendance: 48,093
- Referee: Brad Van Vark
- Television network: ESPN

== 2016 NFL draftees ==
Player	Round	Pick	Position	NFL Club
Hassan Ridgeway	4	116	Defensive tackle	Indianapolis Colts
