= Todd Sturdy =

American football coach (born 1967)

Current position
- Title: Wide receivers coach
- Team: Cal Poly
- Conference: Big Sky

Biographical details
- Born: May 31, 1967 (age 59); Cedar Rapids, Iowa, U.S.
- Education: St. Ambrose University (1990)

Playing career

Football
- 1987–1990: St. Ambrose
- Position: Quarterback

Coaching career (HC unless noted)

Football
- 1991: St. Ambrose (GA)
- 1992–1993: St. Ambrose (ST/DB)
- 1994: St. Ambrose (DC)
- 1995–2006: St. Ambrose
- 2007: Eastern Washington (OC/QB)
- 2008–2011: Washington State (OC/QB)
- 2012–2013: Iowa State (WR)
- 2014–2015: Iowa State (QB)
- 2015: Iowa State (interim OC/QB)
- 2016: Northern Iowa (OC)
- 2017: De Soto HS (KS) (assistant)
- 2018–2019: MidAmerica Nazarene
- 2020–2024: Northwest Missouri State (OC/QB)
- 2025–present: Cal Poly (WR)

Baseball
- 1987–1990: Tipton HS (IA) (sophomores)

Head coaching record
- Overall: 97–53
- Tournaments: 2–6 (NAIA playoffs)

Accomplishments and honors

Championships
- 5 MSFA Midwest League (2000–2003, 2006)

Todd Sturdy (born May 31, 1967) is an American college football coach. He is the wide receivers coach for California Polytechnic State University, San Luis Obispo, a position he has held since 2025. He was the head football coach for St. Ambrose University from 1995 to 2006 and MidAmerica Nazarene University from 2018 to 2019. He also coached for Eastern Washington, Washington State, Iowa State, Northern Iowa, and Northwest Missouri State. He played college football for St. Ambrose as a quarterback.

== Head coaching record ==
| Year | Team | Overall | Conference | Standing | Bowl/playoffs | NAIA D2^{#} |
|---|---|---|---|---|---|---|
St. Ambrose Fighting Bees (Mid-States Football Association) (1995–2006)
| 1995 | St. Ambrose | 6–4 | 0–0 (Note: St. Ambrose was ineligible for conference championship.) | N/A (MWL) | | |
| 1996 | St. Ambrose | 9–1 | 5–1 | 2nd (MWL) | | 17 |
| 1997 | St. Ambrose | 4–6 | 3–3 | 4th (MWL) | | |
| 1998 | St. Ambrose | 5–5 | 2–4 | T–4th (MWL) | | |
| 1999 | St. Ambrose | 4–6 | 2–4 | 5th (MWL) | | |
| 2000 | St. Ambrose | 9–3 | 7–0 | 1st (MWL) | L NAIA Quarterfinal | 7 |
| 2001 | St. Ambrose | 8–3 | 7–0 | 1st (MWL) | L NAIA First Round | 12 |
| 2002 | St. Ambrose | 8–3 | 6–1 | T–1st (MWL) | L NAIA First Round | 14 |
| 2003 | St. Ambrose | 8–4 | 5–2 | T–1st (MWL) | L NAIA Quarterfinal | 9 |
| 2004 | St. Ambrose | 7–3 | 4–3 | T–4th (MWL) | | 19 |
| 2005 | St. Ambrose | 8–3 | 5–2 | 3rd (MWL) | L NAIA First Round | 16 |
| 2006 | St. Ambrose | 10–1 | 8–0 | 1st (MWL) | L NAIA First Round | 9 |
| St. Ambrose: | | 86–42 | 54–20 | | | |
MidAmerica Nazarene Pioneers (Heart of America Athletic Conference) (2018–2019)
| 2018 | MidAmerica Nazarene | 4–7 | 2–2 | T–2nd (South) | | |
| 2019 | MidAmerica Nazarene | 7–4 | 2–3 | T–4th (South) | | |
| MidAmerica Nazarene: | | 11–11 | 4–5 | | | |
| Total: | | 97–53 | | | | |
National championship Conference title Conference division title or championship game berth
