= 2015 Texas Tech Red Raiders football team =

American college football season

2015 Texas Tech Red Raiders football

Texas Bowl, L 27–56 vs. LSU
- Conference: Big 12 Conference
- Record: 7–6 (4–5 Big 12)
- Head coach: Kliff Kingsbury (3rd season)
- Offensive coordinator: Eric Morris (3rd season)
- Offensive scheme: Air raid
- Defensive coordinator: David Gibbs (1st season)
- Co-defensive coordinator: Mike Smith (3rd season)
- Base defense: Multiple
- Home stadium: Jones AT&T Stadium

2015 Big 12 Conference football standings
	Conf.			Overall
Team	W		L	W		L
No. 5 Oklahoma $^	8	–	1	11	–	2
No. 20 Oklahoma State	7	–	2	10	–	3
No. 7 TCU	7	–	2	11	–	2
No. 13 Baylor	6	–	3	10	–	3
West Virginia	4	–	5	8	–	5
Texas Tech	4	–	5	7	–	6
Texas	4	–	5	5	–	7
Kansas State	3	–	6	6	–	7
Iowa State	2	–	7	3	–	9
Kansas	0	–	9	0	–	12
^ – College Football Playoff participant; $ – Conference champion; Rankings from AP Poll

The 2015 Texas Tech Red Raiders football team represented Texas Tech University in the 2015 NCAA Division I FBS football season as members of the Big 12 Conference. Kliff Kingsbury led the Red Raiders in his third season as the program's fifteenth head coach. The Red Raiders played their home games on the university's campus in Lubbock, Texas at Jones AT&T Stadium. They finished the season 7–6 and 4–5 in Big 12 play to finish in 7th. They were invited to the Texas Bowl where they lost to LSU.

This was the last season the Red Raiders finished with a winning record until 2021.

== Schedule ==
Texas Tech announced their 2015 football schedule on November 19, 2014. The 2015 schedule consisted of 6 home games, 5 away games, and 1 neutral site game in the regular season. The Red Raiders hosted Big 12 foes Iowa State, Kansas State, Oklahoma State, and TCU and traveled to Kansas, Oklahoma, Texas, and West Virginia. Texas Tech played Baylor in Arlington, Texas at the AT&T Stadium for the 74th meeting of their rivalry.

The Red Raiders hosted two non conference games against in–state rivals Sam Houston State and UTEP and traveled to their other non conference foe Arkansas in Fayetteville, AR. Texas Tech met the Arkansas Razorbacks in Fayetteville for the first time since 1990.

Date	Time	Opponent	Site	TV	Result	Attendance
September 5	2:30 pm	No. 3 (FCS) Sam Houston State*	Jones AT&T Stadium; Lubbock, TX	FSN/FCS Central	W 59–45	60,073
September 12	2:00 pm	UTEP*	Jones AT&T Stadium; Lubbock, TX	FSSW	W 69–20	54,090
September 19	6:00 pm	at Arkansas*	Donald W. Reynolds Razorback Stadium; Fayetteville, AR (rivalry)	ESPN2	W 35–24	73,334
September 26	3:30 pm	No. 3 TCU	Jones AT&T Stadium; Lubbock, TX (rivalry)	FOX	L 52–55	61,283
October 3	2:30 pm	vs. No. 5 Baylor	AT&T Stadium; Arlington, TX (rivalry)	ABC/ESPN2	L 35–63	56,179
October 10	2:30 pm	Iowa State^{†}	Jones AT&T Stadium; Lubbock, TX	FSN	W 66–31	53,891
October 17	11:00 am	at Kansas	Memorial Stadium; Lawrence, KS	FS1	W 30–20	25,186
October 24	2:30 pm	at No. 17 Oklahoma	Gaylord Family Oklahoma Memorial Stadium; Norman, OK	ABC/ESPN2	L 27–63	85,312
October 31	2:30 pm	No. 12 Oklahoma State	Jones AT&T Stadium; Lubbock, TX	ESPN	L 53–70	54,872
November 7	11:00 am	at West Virginia	Mountaineer Field; Morgantown, WV	FS1	L 26–31	54,932
November 14	2:30 pm	Kansas State	Jones AT&T Stadium; Lubbock, TX	FS1	W 59–44	53,833
November 26	6:30 pm	at Texas	Darrell K Royal–Texas Memorial Stadium; Austin, TX (rivalry)	FS1	W 48–45	94,299
December 29	8:00 pm	vs. No. 22 LSU*	NRG Stadium; Houston, TX (Texas Bowl)	ESPN	L 27–56	71,054
*Non-conference game; ^{†}Homecoming; Rankings from AP Poll released prior to game; All times are in Central time

Schedule source:

== Personnel ==
2015 Texas Tech Red Raiders football team roster
Players
Coaches
Offense

Pos.	#	Name	Class
WR	1	Quan Shorts	Fr
WR	2	Reginald Davis III	Jr
RB	4	Justin Stockton	So
QB	5	Patrick Mahomes	So
WR	6	Devin Lauderdale	Jr
QB	7	Davis Webb	Jr
WR	8	Tony Brown	Fr
WR	9	Jonathan Giles	Fr
QB	10	Payne Sullins	Fr
WR	11	Jakeem Grant	Sr
WR	12	Ian Sadler	So
WR	13	Cameron Batson	So
WR	14	Dylan Cantrell	Jr
WR	15	Donta Thompson	Fr
QB	16	Nic Shimonek	So
WR	18	Jakari Dillard	Fr
WR	19	Zach Austin	So
RB	21	DeAndré Washington	Sr
WR	22	Jake Parker	So
WR	24	R. J. Hester	So
RB	27	Demarcus Felton	Fr
RB	28	Corey Dauphine	Fr

Defense

Pos.	#	Name	Class
DB	1	Nigel Bethel II	So
DB	3	J. J. Gaines	Sr
DL	4	Breiden Fehoko	Fr
DL	5	Gary Moore	So
LB	6	Kris Williams	Jr
DB	7	Jah'Shawn Johnson	Fr
DB	8	Jamile Johnson	Fr
DL	9	Branden Jackson	Sr
LB	10	Pete Robertson	Sr
LB	11	Jacarthy Mack	So
DL	12	Zach Barnes	So
LB	13	Kolin Hall	So
DB	14	Christian Taylor	Fr
DB	15	Keenon Ward	Jr
DB	17	Thierry Nguema	Jr
LB	18	Micah Awe	Sr
DB	20	Tevin Madison	So
DB	24	Payton Hendrix	Fr
LB	25	Sam Atoe	Sr
DB	26	Jon White	Sr
DB	27	Adaryan Jones	Fr
DB	28	Paul Banks III	Jr
DB	29	Joseph Clark	Fr
LB	29	Mason Reed	Fr

Special teams

Pos.	#	Name	Class
K	42	Taylor Symmank	Sr
K	45	Nicholas Keller	Fr
DS	46	David Brenner	Sr
K	49	Michael Barden	Fr
DS	53	Kyle Heffron	So
K	96	Clayton Hatfield	Fr

Head coach

- Kliff Kingsbury

Coordinators/assistant coaches

- Eric Morris
  Offensive coordinator
- David Gibbs
  Defensive coordinator
- Mike Smith
  Co-defensive coordinator
- Joe Robinson
  Special teams coordinator
- Lee Hays
  Offensive line
- Emmett Jones
  Outside receivers
- Kevin Patrick
  Defensive line
- Zac Spavital
  Linebackers
- DeShaun Foster
  Running backs
- Zach Kittley
  Graduate assistant

Legend

- (C) Team captain
- (S) Suspended
- (I) Ineligible
- Injured
- Redshirt

Roster
Last update: June 4, 2024

== Game summaries ==
=== No. 3 (FCS) Sam Houston State ===
No. 3 (FCS) Sam Houston State Bearkats at Texas Tech Red Raiders – Game summary

Quarter	1	2	3	4	Total
No. 3 (FCS) Bearkats	14	17	0	14	45
Red Raiders	14	28	17	0	59

at Jones AT&T Stadium, Lubbock, Texas

- Date: September 5
- Game time: 2:30 p.m. CDT
- Game weather: Partly cloudy, 89 °F (32 °C)
- Game attendance: 60,073
- Referee: Brandon Cruse
- TV announcers (FSN/FCS Central): Mike Morgan, J. C. Pearson, and Steffi Sorensen
- Box score, Recap

Game information

First quarter

- TTU – Jakeem Grant 3-yard run (Michael Barden kick), 11:54. Red Raiders 7–0. Drive: 11 plays, 75 yards, 3:06.
- SHSU – Ridgeway Frank 14-yard run (Luc Swimberghe kick), 8:51. Tied 7–7. Drive: 11 plays, 93 yards, 3:03.
- TTU – Devin Lauderdale 64-yard pass from Patrick Mahomes (Michael Barden kick), 3:54. Red Raiders 14–7. Drive: 2 plays, 59 yards, 0:13.
- SHSU – Donavan Williams 1-yard run (Luc Swimberghe kick), 0:53. Tied 14–14. Drive: 2 plays, 12 yards, 0:32.

Second quarter

- TTU – Ian Sadler 8-yard pass from Patrick Mahomes (Michael Barden kick), 13:24. Red Raiders 21–14. Drive: 8 plays, 69 yards, 2:29.
- SHSU – Luc Swimberghe 48-yard field goal, 7:30. Red Raiders 21–17. Drive: 6 plays, 47 yards, 2:16.
- TTU – Jakeem Grant 94-yard kickoff return (Michael Barden kick), 7:13. Red Raiders 28–17.
- SHSU – Donavan Williams 2-yard run (Luc Swimberghe kick), 3:44. Red Raiders 28–24. Drive: 10 plays, 75 yards, 3:29.
- TTU – Ian Sadler 53-yard pass from Patrick Mahomes (Michael Barden kick), 2:23. Red Raiders 35–24. Drive: 6 plays, 82 yards, 1:21.
- SHSU – Davion Davis 29-yard pass from Jeremiah Briscoe (Luc Swimberghe kick), 0:52. Red Raiders 35–31. Drive: 8 plays, 75 yards, 1:31.
- TTU – Devin Lauderdale 29-yard pass from Patrick Mahomes (Michael Barden kick), 0:14. Red Raiders 42–31. Drive: 4 plays, 67 yards, 0:38.

Third quarter

- TTU – J. J. Gaines 47-yard interception return (Michael Barden kick), 14:14. Red Raiders 49–31.
- TTU – Michael Barden 27-yard field goal, 9:59. Red Raiders 52–31. Drive: 9 plays, 42 yards, 2:53.
- TTU – Justin Stockton 4-yard run (Clayton Hatfield kick), 1:09. Red Raiders 59–31. Drive: 11 plays, 70 yards, 4:06.

Fourth quarter

- SHSU – Donavan Williams 4-yard run (Luc Swimberghe kick), 10:06. Red Raiders 59–38. Drive: 6 plays, 47 yards, 2:14.
- SHSU – Donavan Williams 1-yard run (Luc Swimberghe kick), 1:53. Red Raiders 59–45. Drive: 10 plays, 64 yards, 3:23.

Statistics	SHSU	TTU
First downs	34	29
Total yards	637	611
Rushing yards	317	174
Passing yards	320	437
Turnovers	4	1
Time of possession	31:59	28:01

Team	Category	Player	Statistics
Sam Houston State	Passing	Jeremiah Briscoe	18/24, 176 yards, TD, INT
Sam Houston State	Rushing	Donavan Williams	12 rushes, 99 yards, 4 TD
Sam Houston State	Receiving	Davion Davis	12 receptions, 103 yards, TD
Texas Tech	Passing	Patrick Mahomes	33/53, 425 yards, 4 TD, INT
Texas Tech	Rushing	DeAndré Washington	13 rushes, 74 yards
Texas Tech	Receiving	Devin Lauderdale	8 receptions, 150 yards, 2 TD

The Texas Tech Red Raiders played their 1,000th game overall against #3 FCS Sam Houston State. Despite defensive problems throughout the game, the Red Raiders held on to beat the Bearkats 59–45. A Jakeem Grant 94 yard kickoff return for a touchdown in the 2nd quarter was the first time since the 2013 Holiday Bowl that the Red Raiders returned a kick for a touchdown.

=== UTEP ===
UTEP Miners at Texas Tech Red Raiders – Game summary

Quarter	1	2	3	4	Total
Miners	7	10	0	3	20
Red Raiders	17	21	17	14	69

at Jones AT&T Stadium, Lubbock, Texas

- Date: September 12
- Game time: 2:00 p.m. CDT
- Game weather: Mostly cloudy, 78 °F (26 °C)
- Game attendance: 54,090
- Referee: Eddy Shelton
- TV: FSSW
- Box score, Recap

Game information

First quarter

- TTU Jakeem Grant 60 yard pass from Patrick Mahomes (Michael Barden kick) TTU 7–0 (13:57)
- TTU Michael Barden 32 yard field goal TTU 10–0 (7:04)
- UTEP Aaron Jones 24 yard pass from Mack Leftwich (Jay Mattox kick) TTU 10–7 (1:56)
- TTU Justin Stockon 46 yard pass from Patrick Mahomes (Michael Barden kick) TTU 17–7 (0:51)

Second quarter

- UTEP Aaron Jones 91 yard run (Jay Mattox kick) TTU 17–14 (14:46)
- TTU Patrick Mahomes 1 yard run (Michael Barden kick) TTU 24–14 (9:28)
- UTEP Jay Mattox 24 yard field goal TTU 24–17 (5:13)
- TTU Patrick Mahomes 12 yard run (Michael Barden kick) TTU 31–17 (2:39)
- TTU Reginald Davis 35 yard pass from Patrick Mahomes (Michael Barden kick) TTU 38–17 (0:58)

Third quarter

- TTU Devin Lauderdale 34 yard pass from Patrick Mahomes (Michael Barden kick) TTU 45–17 (13:24)
- TTU DeAndré Washington 51 yard run (Michael Barden kick) TTU 52–17 (11:15)
- TTU Clayton Hatfield 33 yard field goal TTU 55–17 (3:59)

Fourth quarter

- UTEP Jay Mattox 42 yard field goal TTU 55–20 (12:58)
- TTU Davis Webb 1 yard run (Clayton Hatfield kick) TTU 62–20 (8:51)
- TTU Davis Webb 5 yard run (Clayton Hatfield kick) TTU 69–20 (6:02)

Leading Passers

- TTU – Patrick Mahomes – 18/33, 361 yards, 4 TD
- UTEP – Mack Leftwich – 14/22, 164 yards, TD

Leading Rushers

- TTU – DeAndré Washington – 12 rushes, 138 yards, TD
- UTEP – Aaron Jones – 17 rushes, 139 yards, TD

Leading Receivers

- TTU – Jakeem Grant – 7 receptions, 141 yards, TD
- UTEP – Hayden Plinke – 4 receptions, 87 yards

In the annual Celebrate Cotton Game, Texas Tech's offense took off, compiling over 650 yards, to beat the Miners 69–20. With the win, the Red Raiders started a season 2–0 for the 11th year in a row. After giving up 637 yards a week prior against the Bearkats, the Tech defense only gave up 414 yards against the Miners.

=== At Arkansas ===
Texas Tech Red Raiders at Arkansas Razorbacks – Game summary

Quarter	1	2	3	4	Total
Red Raiders	14	7	7	7	35
Razorbacks	7	14	3	0	24

at Donald W. Reynolds Razorback Stadium Fayetteville, Arkansas

- Date: September 19
- Game time: 6:00 p.m. CDT
- Game weather: Scattered clouds, 74 °F (23 °C)
- Game attendance: 73,334
- Referee: Mike Defee
- TV announcers (ESPN 2): Mark Jones, Brock Huard, and Shannon Spake
- Box score, Recap

Game information

First quarter

- TTU – 10:45 Reginald Davis 3 yard pass from Patrick Mahomes (Michael Barden kick) TTU 7–0
- ARK – 3:06 Alex Collins 1 yard run (Cole Hedlund kick) Tied 7–7
- TTU – 0:21 Patrick Mahomes 1 yard run (Michael Barden kick) TTU 14–7

Second quarter

- ARK – 8:18 Hunter Henry 7 yard pass from Brandon Allen (Cole Hedlund kick) Tied 14–14
- TTU – 7:52 Reginald Davis 72 yard pass from Jakeem Grant (Micheal Barden kick) TTU 21–14
- ARK – 1:03 Drew Morgan 24 yard pass from Brandon Allen (Cole Hedlund kick) Tied 21–21

Third quarter

- TTU – 10:31 Patrick Mahomes 2 yard run (Michael Barden kick) TTU 28–21
- ARK – 2:00 Cole Hedlund 22 yard field goal TTU 28–24

Fourth quarter

- TTU – Justin Stockton 22 yard run (Michael Barden kick) TTU 35–24

Leading Passers

- TTU – Patrick Mahomes – 26/30, 243 yards, TD, 2 INT
- ARK – Brandon Allen – 16/21, 196 yards, 2 TD, INT

Leading Rushers

- TTU – Patrick Mahomes – 10 rushes, 58 yards, 2 TD
- ARK – Alex Collins – 28 rushes, 170 yards, TD

Leading Receivers

- TTU – Reginald Davis – 5 receptions, 115 yards, 2 TD
- ARK – Drew Morgan – 4 receptions, 45 yards, TD

The Red Raiders traveled to Fayetteville for the first time since 1990 to take on the Arkansas Razorbacks. After both teams tying 21–21 at the half, the Tech defense held the Razorbacks to only a field goal in the second half, with Tech adding on two touchdowns. After losing 28–49 the previous season, Texas Tech defeated Arkansas 35–24 giving the Red Raiders their 8th overall win against the Razorbacks. With the win, Texas Tech improved to 3–0 on the season. Despite only having the ball for 23:17, the Tech offense outgained the Razorbacks with 486 yards, versus Arkansas's 424.

=== No. 3 TCU ===
No. 3 TCU Horned Frogs at Texas Tech Red Raiders – Game summary

Quarter	1	2	3	4	Total
No. 3 Horned Frogs	16	17	7	15	55
Red Raiders	14	14	10	14	52

at Jones AT&T Stadium, Lubbock, Texas

- Date: September 26, 2015
- Game time: 3:30 p.m. CDT
- Game weather: Cloudy, 78 °F (26 °C)
- Game attendance: 61,283
- Referee: Brad Van Vark
- TV announcers (Fox): Joe Davis, Brady Quinn, and Kris Budden
- Box score, Recap

Game information

First quarter

- TCU – Josh Doctson 9-yard pass from Trevone Boykin (Jaden Oberkrom, kick), 10:51. TCU 7–0. Drive: 8 plays, 80 yards, 2:54.
- TTU – DeAndre Washington 1-yard run (Clayton Hatfield, kick), 9:42. Tie 7–7. Drive: 4 plays, 86 yards, 1:09.
- TCU – Safety. TCU 9–7.
- TCU – Aaron Green 1-yard run (Jaden Oberkrom, kick), 3:34. TCU 16–7. Drive: 10 plays, 64 yards, 3:48.
- TTU – DeAndre Washington 26-yard run (Clayton Hatfield, kick), 2:02. TCU 16–14. Drive: 4 plays, 49 yards, 1:32.

Second quarter

- TTU – Jakeem Grant 45-yard pass from Patrick Mahomes (Clayton Hatfield, kick), 13:22. Texas Tech 21–16. Drive: 3 plays, 63 yards, 0:44.
- TCU – Jaden Oberkrom 42-yard field goal, 9:46. Texas Tech 21–19. Drive: 6 plays, 37 yards, 1:46.
- TCU – Josh Doctson 52-yard pass from Trevone Boykin (Jaden Oberkrom, kick), 6:05. TCU 26–21. Drive: 4 plays, 62 yards, 0:53.
- TTU – Patrick Mahomes 4-yard run (Clayton Hatfield, kick), 3:26. Texas Tech 28–26. Drive: 11 plays, 75 yards, 2:39.
- TCU – Josh Doctson 5-yard pass from Trevone Boykin (Jaden Oberkrom, kick), 0:15. TCU 33–28. Drive: 11 plays, 75 yards, 3:11.

Third quarter

- TTU – DeAndre Washington 2-yard run (Clayton Hatfield, kick), 6:28. Texas Tech 35–33. Drive: 9 plays, 80 yards, 3:47.
- TCU – Aaron Green 7-yard run (Jaden Oberkrom, kick), 2:58. TCU 40–35. Drive: 10 plays, 75 yards, 3:30.
- TTU – Clayton Hatfield 37-yd field goal, 0:44. TCU 40–38. Drive: 8 plays, 59 yards, 2:14.

Fourth quarter

- TTU – DeAndre Washington 1-yard run (Clayton Hatfield, kick), 10:53. Texas Tech 45–40. Drive: 12 plays, 86 yards, 3:26.
- TCU – Kyle Hicks 22-yd run (pass good), 8:22. TCU 48–45. Drive: 6 plays, 79 yards, 2:31.
- TTU – Justin Stockton 50-yard pass from Patrick Mahomes (Clayton Hatfield, kick), 5:55. Texas Tech 52–48. Drive: 8 plays, 75 yards, 2:27.
- TCU – Aaron Green 4-yard pass from Trevone Boykin (Jaden Oberkrom, kick), 0:23. TCU 55–52. Drive: 9 plays, 53 yards, 2:09.

Top passers

- TCU – Trevone Boykin – 34/54, 485 yards, 4 TD
- TTU – Patrick Mahomes – 25/45, 392 yards, 2 TD

Top rushers

- TCU – Aaron Green – 28 rushes, 162 yards, 2 TD
- TTU – DeAndre Washington – 22 rushes, 188 yards, 4 TD

Top Receiving

- TCU – Josh Doctson – 18 receptions, 267 yards, 3 TD
- TTU – Jakeem Grant – 8 receptions, 126 yards, TD

After the TCU defense caused a 3-and-out for the Tech offense, the TCU offense scored on their first drive following a Trevone Boykin 9 yard pass to Josh Doctson. After trailing for the first time of the 2015 season, Tech quickly responded (in just 70 seconds) on their next drive to tie the game 7–7 with a 1-yard rush from DeAndré Washington. Momentum slowed for the Red Raiders following a high snap that went over the head of Patrick Mahomes that resulted in a safety. The Horned Frogs scored on their next possession to extend their lead 16–7. On the following kickoff, Jakeem Grant returned the kick to the 50 yard line, giving some momentum for Tech. With Washington's 20 yard touchdown run, the Red Raiders closed back in on the Horned Frogs to trail 16–14 late in the first quarter.

Early in the second quarter, the Tech special teams blocked a Jaden Oberkrom field goal attempt. A ruffing the passer penalty helped keep the drive alive for the Red Raiders, who capped it off with a 45-yard pass from Mahomes to Grant for a touchdown. With the touchdown, the Red Raiders took their first lead of the day with 13:22 left in the first half. With both teams punting on their next possessions, TCU settled for a 42-yard field goal from Oberkrom to trail 19–21 with 9:46 left in the half. On a 3rd and long, TCU retook the lead with Boykin connecting with Doctson for 52 yards for a touchdown. On a 4th and 1, Mahomes ran 4 yards for touchdown, with Tech retaking the lead with 3:26 left in the half. With 0:15 left in the half, another lead change occurred with a 4-yard pass from Boykin to Doctson. At the half, TCU lead Texas Tech 33–28.

Receiving the ball to start out the second half, TCU marched down the field. After a touchdown call was overturned upon further review, the Horned Frogs sent out their field goal unit. However, on the 25 yard attempt Oberkrom missed with the ball going wide right. The mistakes continued for TCU 2 plays later as a defensive pass interference gave the Red Raiders 15 yards following a deep pass that went incomplete. After a 3rd down play within the red zone, TCU committed an unnecessary roughness penalty that gave the Red Raiders another opportunity to score. Following the penalty, Texas Tech scored with a 2-yard run from Washington to take a 35–33 lead with 6:28 left in the 3rd. With 2:53 left in the 3rd, Green ran 7 yards for a touchdown to give TCU a 40–35 lead. TCU received their 3rd 15 yard penalty following a sideline interference call. With a false start penalty against Tech, the Red Raiders faced a 3rd and 17. On the following play, Grant fumbled the ball and recovered it. However, he failed to make the 1st down and Tech settled for a field goal instead. With Clayton Hatfield's 37 yard field goal, Tech trailed TCU 38–40 with 0:44 left in the 3rd.

On 4th and 2 in the 4th quarter, Mahomes ran to gain the 1st down, Tech's first successful 4th down conversion for the day. A few plays later TCU committed yet another foul, giving Tech a 1st down. 2 plays later Tech found the end zone with a 1-yard run from Washington to give the Red Raiders a 45–40 lead with 10:53 left to play. TCU reclaimed the lead with a Kyle Hicks 21 yard run. With the 2 point conversion, TCU lead 48–45 with 8:22 left to play. Receiving the ball, Tech started at their own 10 yard line following a penalty. Tech ended the drive with a 50-yard touchdown pass from Mahomes to Stockton. With Hatfield's kick Tech lead the Horned Frogs 52–58 with 5:55 left to play. TCU was penalized yet again on their first play following the kickoff due to a delay of game. The Texas Tech defense forced a 3-and-out for TCU, who punted the ball on 4th and 8. Going 3-and-out on their next possession, Tech punted the ball back to TCU on 4th and 4 with nearly 3 minutes left to play. With 0:23 left to play, TCU scored a touchdown following a tipped ball to take a 55–52 lead. Despite another 15 yard penalty against TCU, Tech fell to the Horned Frogs 55–52 and dropped to 3–1.

=== Vs. No. 5 Baylor ===
Texas Tech Red Raiders vs. No. 5 Baylor Bears – Game summary

Quarter	1	2	3	4	Total
Red Raiders	14	7	7	7	35
No. 5 Bears	28	21	7	7	63

at AT&T Stadium Arlington, Texas

- Date: October 3
- Game time: 2:30 p.m. CDT
- Game weather: None (retractable roof closed)
- Game attendance: 56,179
- Referee: Reggie Smith
- TV: ABC/ESPN 2
- Box score, Recap

Game information

First quarter

- BAY 13:55 – Shock Linwood 79 yard run (Chris Callahan kick) BAY 7–0
- TTU 12:42 – Zach Austin 55 yard pass from Patrick Mahomes (Clayton Hatfield kick) Tied 7–7
- BAY 11:00 – K.D. Cannon 28 yard pass from Seth Russell (Chris Callahan kick) BAY 14–7
- BAY 44:45 – Corey Coleman 24 yard pass from Seth Russell (Chris Callahan kick) BAY 21–7
- TTU 2:16 – Cameron Batson 37 yard pass from Patrick Mahomes (Clayton Hatfield kick) BAY 21–14
- BAY 1:23 – Seth Russell 1 yard run (Chris Callahan kick) BAY 28–14

Second quarter

- BAY 11:15 – Shock Linwood 8 yard run (Chris Callahan kick) BAY 35–14
- BAY 8:22 – Corey Coleman 16 yard pass from Seth Russell (Chris Callahan kick) BAY 42–14
- TTU 4:04 – Tony Brown 13 yard pass from Patrick Mahomes (Clayton Hatfield kick) BAY 42–21
- BAY 1:41 – Seth Russell 2 yard run (Chris Callahan kick) BAY 49–21

Third quarter

- TTU 12:49 – Patrick Mahomes 25 yard run (Clayton Hatfield kick) BAY 49–28
- BAY 8:25 – Johnny Jefferson 6 yard run (Chris Callahan kick) BAY 56–28

Fourth quarter

- BAY 11:57 – Corey Coleman 16 yard pass from Seth Russell (Chris Callahan kick) BAY 63–28
- TTU 8:34 – Jonathan Giles 13 yard pass from Davis Webb (Clayton Hatfield kick) BAY 63–35

Leading Passers

- TTU – Patrick Mahomes – 32/50, 415 yards, 3 TD, 2 INT
- BAY – Seth Russell – 15/23, 285 yards, 4 TD, INT

Leading Rushers

- TTU – Patrick Mahomes – 2 rushes, 39 yards, TD
- BAY – Shock Linwood – 20 rushes, 221 yards, 2 TD

Leading Receivers

- TTU – Zach Austin – 8 receptions, 110 yards, TD
- BAY – Corey Coleman – 7 receptions, 110 yards, 3 TD

=== Iowa State ===
Iowa State Cyclones at Texas Tech Red Raiders – Game summary

Quarter	1	2	3	4	Total
Cyclones	7	14	3	7	31
Red Raiders	17	21	7	21	66

at Jones AT&T Stadium Lubbock, Texas

- Date: October 10
- Game time: 2:30 p.m. CST
- Game weather: Mostly cloudy, 76 °F (24 °C)
- Game attendance: 53,891
- Referee: Dan Romeo
- TV announcers (FSN): Mark Followill, Brian Baldinger, and Lesley McCaslin
- Box score, Recap

Game information

First quarter

- TTU 11:27 – Clayton Hatfield 24 yard field goal TTU 3–0
- TTU 10:44 – DeAndré Washington 7 yard run (Clayton Hatfield kick) TTU 10–0
- ISU 7:03 – Quenton Bundrage 33 yard pass from Sam Richardson (Cole Netten kick) TTU 10–7
- TTU 6:48 – Jakeem Grant 75 yard pass from Patrick Mahomes (Clayton Hatfield kick) TTU 17–7

Second quarter

- ISU 14:18 – Joshua Thomas 1 yard run (Cole Netten kick) TTU 17–14
- TTU 12:02 – Reggie Davis 33 yard pass from Patrick Mahomes (Clayton Hatfield kick) TTU 24–14
- TTU 8:21 – DeAndré Washington 49 yard pass from Patrick Mahomes (Clayton Hatfield kick) TTU 31–14
- TTU 2:42 – Jakeem Grant 37 yard pass from Patrick Mahomes (Clayton Hatfield kick) TTU 38–14
- ISU 1:30 – Joshua Thomas 1 yard run (Cole Netten kick) TTU 38–21

Third quarter

- ISU 6:02 – Cole Netten 20 yard field goal TTU 38–24
- TTU 3:37 – Justin Stockton 54 yard run (Clayton Hatfield kick) TTU 45–24

Fourth quarter

- TTU 14:54 – Jonathon Giles 3 yard pass from Patrick Mahomes (Clayton Hatfield kick) TTU 52–24
- TTU 7:35 – Jonathon Giles 21 yard pass from Davis Webb (Clayton Hatfield kick) TTU 59–24
- TTU 3:56 – Demarcus Felton 53 yard run (Clayton Hatfield kick) TTU 66–24
- ISU 0:59 – Joel Lanning 1 yard run (Cole Netten kick) TTU 66–31

Leading Passers

- ISU – Sam Richardson – 10/21, 139 yards, TD, 3 INT
- TTU – Patrick Mahomes – 33/46, 428 yards, 5 TD

Leading Rushers

- ISU – Mike Warren – 23 rushes, 245 yards
- TTU – Justin Stockton – 7 rushes, 101 yards, 1TD

Leading Receivers

- ISU – Quenten Bundrage – 3 receptions, 75 yards, TD
- TTU – Jakeem Grant – 9 receptions, 166 yards, 2 TD

In the first quarter Patrick Mahomes connected with Jakeem Grant for a 75-yard touchdown pass. This play is the longest from scrimmage for the Red Raiders of the 2015 season. The Red Raiders set a school record with 776 yards on offense with a 66–31 win over the Cyclones.

=== At Kansas ===
Texas Tech Red Raiders at Kansas Jayhawks – Game summary

Quarter	1	2	3	4	Total
Red Raiders	3	17	3	7	30
Jayhawks	0	0	6	14	20

at Memorial Stadium, Lawrence, Kansas

- Date: October 17
- Game time: 11:00 a.m. CST
- Game weather: Partly cloudy, 52 °F (11 °C)
- Game attendance: 25,186
- Referee: C. Castleberry
- TV: FS1
- Box score, Recap

Game information

First quarter

- TTU 0:36 – Clayton Hatfield 30 yard field goal TTU 3–0

Second quarter

- TTU 13:10 – DeAndré Washington 1 yard run (Le'Raven Clark run for two-point conversion) TTU 11–0
- TTU 10:13 – Clayton Hatfield 24 yard field goal TTU 14–0
- TTU 1:02 – Reginald Davis 45 yard pass from Patrick Mahomes TTU 20–0

Third quarter

- KU 5:39 – Darious Crawley 10 yard pass from Ryan Willis TTU 20–6
- TTU 1:17 – Clayton Hatfield 25 yard field goal TTU 23–6

Fourth quarter

- KU 10:32 – Tre' Parmalee 25 yard pass from Ryan Willis (Nick Barlotta kick) TTU 23–13
- KU 6:26 – Taylor Cox 1 yard run (Nick Barlotta kick) TTU 23–20
- TTU 4:07 – Jah'Shawn Johnson 27 yard interception return (Clayton Hatfield kick) 30–20

Leading Passers

- TTU – Patrick Mahomes – 30/51, 359 yards, TD, INT
- KU – Ryan Willis – 35/50, 330 yards, 2 TD, INT

Leading Rushers

- TTU – DeAndré Washington – 22 rushes, 160 yards, TD
- KU – De'Andre Mann – 15 rushes, 107 yards

Leading Receivers

- TTU – Tre' Parmalee – 5 receptions, 84 yards, TD
- KU – Zach Austin – 8 receptions, 80 yards

Problems on special teams affected both the Jayhawks and Red Raiders during the first half. Kansas kicker Nick Barlotta missed a field goal from 22 yards, with Tech scoring on the ensuing drive, extending their lead to 20–0. Kicking for the extra point, Clayton Hatfield's kick was blocked. Closing out the first half, the Jayhawks called in kicker Matthew Wyman to make a 34-yard field goal, who also missed. At halftime, Texas Tech led Kansas 20–0.

Receiving the ball to start the 2nd half, Tech was forced to punt. With the punt, the Red Raiders failed to score on either of their opening possessions for the first time of the 2015 season. Kansas fumbled the ball at the Tech 49 on their next possession. On the ensuing drive on 4th and 23, Clayton Hatfield missed a 48-yard field goal. After failing to get on the board in the first half, Kansas scored on a Darious Crawley 10 yard pass from Ryan Willis. With Wyman missing the extra point, the Jayhawks trailed the Red Raiders 6–20 with 5:39 left in the 3rd. After a Tech fumble, Kansas defender Kans Smithson recovered it 89 yards for a touchdown. An illegal block in the back called the return to the Tech 33. On 4th and 2 from the Tech 25, Willis connected with Tre' Parmalee for a touchdown to trail 12–23. With Barlotta making the extra point, Kansas trailed Texas Tech 13–23 with 10:32 left to play. On 2nd and 10 from their own 7-yard line, Willis fumbled the ball in his own endzone, with two Tech defenders getting a hold of the ball. The ball popped out of both defenders' hands with Kansas's De'Andre Mann recovering the ball. On the next play, Willis's pass was intercepted by Jah'Shawn Johnson, who returned it 27 yards for a touchdown. With Hatfield's kick good, the Red Raiders extended their lead to 30–20.

In a game that was expected to be a blowout, Texas Tech beat Kansas 30–20. With the win, the Red Raiders improved to 5–2 and the Jayhawks fell to 0–6.

=== Oklahoma ===
Week Eight: No. 17 Oklahoma Sooners vs. Texas Tech Red Raiders – Game summary

Quarter	1	2	3	4	Total
Red Raiders	3	14	10	0	27
No. 17 Sooners	14	14	21	14	63

at Gaylord Family Oklahoma Memorial Stadium Norman, Oklahoma

- Date: October 24
- Game time: 2:30 p.m. CDT
- Game weather: 60 °F (16 °C), cloudy
- Game attendance: 85,132
- Referee: Mike Defee
- TV announcers (ABC/ESPN2): Adam Amin (Play-by-play), Kelly Stouffer (Color) & Olivia Harlan (Sideline)

Game information

First quarter

- OKLA 8:18 – Joe Mixon 11 yard rush (Austin Seibert kick) OKLA 7–0 8 plays, 62 yards, 2:34
- OKLA 6:39 – Samaje Perine 3 yard run (Austin Seibert kick) OKLA 14–0 1 play, 3 yards, 0:08
- TTU 1:42 – Clayton Hatfield 34 yard field goal OKLA 14–3 14 plays, 59 yards, 4:57

Second quarter

- OKLA 13:27 – Joe Mixon 17 yard rush (Austin Seibert kick) OKLA 21–3 9 plays, 76 yards, 3:15
- TTU 9:32 – Reginald Davis 6 yard pass from Patrick Mahomes (Clayton Hatfield kick) OKLA 21–10 4 plays, 29 yards, 1:22
- TTU 7:05 – DeAndré Washington 13 yard run (Clayton Hatfield kick) OKLA 21–17 4 plays, 32 yards, 1:16
- OKLA 3:31 – Samaje Perine 10 yard run (Austin Seibert kick) OKLA 28–17 8 plays, 75 yards, 3:34

Third quarter

- OKLA 14:14 – Mark Andrews 13 yard pass from Baker Mayfield (Austin Seibert kick) OKLA 35–17 4 plays, 75 yards, 0:46
- TTU 9:16 – Clayton Hatfield 27 yard kick OKLA 35–20 11 plays, 63 yards, 4:58
- OKLA 7:04 – Samaje Perine 6 yard run (Austin Seibert kick) OKLA 42–20 6 plays, 75 yards, 2:21
- TTU 4:50 – Patrick Mahomes 1 yard run (Clayton Hatfield kick) OKLA 42–27 9 plays, 62 yards, 2:14
- OKLA 1:03 – Durron Neal 15 yard pass from Baker Mayfield (Austin Seibert kick) OKLA 49–27 9 plays, 65 yards, 3:47

Fourth quarter

- OKLA 8:18 – Samaje Perine 2 yard run (Austin Seibert kick) OKLA 56–27 9 plays, 54 yards, 4:53
- OKLA 2:26 – Alex Ross 4 yard run (Austin Seibert kick) OKLA 63–27 8 plays, 36 yards, 4:32

Leading Passers

- TTU – Patrick Mahomes – 26/40, 233 yards, TD, 4 INT
- OKLA – Baker Mayfield – 15/22, 212 yards, 2 TD, INT

Leading Rushers

- TTU – DeAndré Washington – 19 rushes, 94 yards, TD
- OKLA – Samaje Perine – 23 rushes, 201 yards, 4 TD

Leading Receivers

- TTU – Reginald Davis – 7 receptions, 52 yards, TD
- OKLA – Durron Neal – 5 receptions, 44 yards, TD

Texas Tech punted the ball on their first two possessions, with OU punting on their first possession as well. The Sooners struck first with a Joe Mixon 11 yard run for a touchdown. With Austin Seibert making the extra point, OU took a 7–0 lead. The next play for the Red Raiders ended with a Patrick Mahomes interception that was caught by Eric Striker and returned for 33 yards. The Sooners capitalized on the interception with a Samaje Perine 3 yard rush for a touchdown. With Seibert's kick good, OU extended their lead to 14–0 with 6:39 left in the 1st. On 4th and goal at the Oklahoma 1, the Red Raiders found the endzone, but an offensive pass-interference penalty negated the touchdown. Backed up to the Oklahoma 16, the Red Raiders settled for a 34-yard field goal from Clayton Hatfield. With the kick good, Tech trailed OU 3–14 with 1:42 left in the 1st.

Oklahoma scored early in the 2nd quarter with their 3rd rushing touchdown of the day, extending their lead to 21–3. At the Tech 39, OU receiver Dominque Alexander fumbled the ball, which was recovered by Tech defender Jah'Shawn Johnson, who returned it to the Oklahoma 29 yard line. The fumble recovery set up a touchdown for the Red Raiders, their first of the day. On the next possession for the Sooners, a Baker Mayfield pass was intercepted by Justis Nelson, who returned it for 45 yards. Once again, the Red Raiders capitalized on an OU turnover, with a DeAndré Washington 13 yard rush for a touchdown. With Hatfield's kick good, the Red Raiders trailed the Sooners 17–21 with 7:05 left in the half. After Texas Tech scored 14 unanswered points off of turnovers, Oklahoma responded with their 4th rushing touchdown of the day, with Perine going 10 yards. With Seibert making the extra point, the Sooners extended their lead to 28–17 with 3:31 left in the half. On their first play on their next possession, Tech turned the ball over after a Mahomes pass was deflected and recovered by Oklahoma's Frank Shannon. On 4th and 5th from the Tech 15, Seibert was brought on to attempt a 32-yard field goal. Seibert's kick was no good, going wide left. To close out the first half, Mahomes's pass was intercepted in the endzone. OU's offense took the knee, closing out the half with a 28–17 lead.

The Sooners got their first passing touchdown of the day to start out the 2nd half. Mayfield connected with Mark Andrews for a 13-yard touchdown reception, extending OU's lead to 35–17 with Seibert's kick. Tech marched down to the Oklahoma 10 yard line on their next possession, but had to settle for a Hatfield 28 yard field goal. With the kick good, the Red Raiders trailed the Sooners 20–35 with 9:16 left in the 3rd. OU scored on their next possession with another rushing touchdown from Perine. With Seibert's kick good, OU gained their largest lead of the day with 22 points. Tech answered back with a 1-yard rush from Mahomes for a touchdown. With Hatfield's kick good, the Red Raiders trailed the Sooners 27–42 with 4:50 left in the 3rd. Once again, the Sooners scored on their next possession to extend their lead to 49–27. Down by 22, the Red Raiders ended the 3rd quarter from their own 36, looking for a comeback win.

The Red Raiders started out the 4th quarter with Washington rushing 14 yards to the 50 yard line, breaking a tackle in the process. A penalty against the Red Raiders pushed them back to their own 45. Mahomes was sacked on the ensuing play, going into 3rd and 31. The Red Raiders went for it on 4th down and 11, turning it over on downs after Mahomes was sacked again. Both teams finished the game with their respective backup quarterbacks: Trevor Knight for Oklahoma and Davis Webb for Texas Tech. The Red Raiders fell to the Sooners 27–63 in their first game of the 2015 season where they failed to score at least 30 points.

=== Oklahoma State ===
Week Nine: #12 Oklahoma State Cowboys at Texas Tech Red Raiders – Game summary

Quarter	1	2	3	4	Total
No. 12 Cowboys	14	14	14	28	70
Red Raiders	24	14	0	15	53

at Jones AT&T Stadium Lubbock, Texas

- Date: October 31
- Game time: 2:30 p.m. CDT
- Game weather: 68 °F (20 °C), few clouds in the area
- TV: ESPN

Game information

First quarter

- TTU 14:14 – Justin Stockton 42 yard pass from Patrick Mahomes (Clayton Hatfield kick) TTU 7–0
- TTU 9:34 – Justin Stockton 2 yard pass from Patrick Mahomes (Clayton Hatfield kick) TTU 14–0
- TTU 6:21 – Clayton Hatfield 42 yard field goal TTU 17–0
- OKST 4:25 – Austin Hayes 19 yard pass from Blake Jarwin (Ben Grogan kick) TTU 17–7
- TTU 4:13 – Jakeem Grant 100 yard kickoff return (Clayton Hatfield kick) TTU 24–7
- OKST 0:42 – Austin Hayes 12 yard pass from Mason Rudolph (Ben Grogan kick) TTU 24–14

Second quarter

- TTU 11:35 – Jakeem Grant 12 yard pass from Patrick Mahomes (Clayton Hatfield kick) TTU 31–14
- OKST 8:14 – Raymond Taylor 4 yard run (Ben Grogan kick) TTU 31–21
- OKST 3:37 – Brandon Sheperd 31 yard pass from Mason Rudolph (Ben Grogan kick) TTU 31–28
- TTU 0:46 – Patrick Mahomes 1 yard run (Clayton Hatfield kick) TTU 38–28

Third quarter

- OKST 8:51 – Jalen McClesky 67 yard punt return (Ben Grogan kick) TTU 38–35
- OKST 1:59 – Raymond Taylor 28 yard run (Ben Grogan kick) OKST 42–38

Fourth quarter

- TTU 12:40 – Ian Sadler 20 yard pass from Patrick Mahomes (Clayton Hatfield kick) TTU 45–42
- OKST 12:04 – J.W. Walsh 1 yard run (Ben Grogan kick) OKST 49–45
- OKST 9:23 – James Washington 75 yard pass from J.W. Walsh (Ben Grogan kick) OKST 56–45
- TTU 4:48 – DeAndré Washington 4 yard run (Patrick Mahomes to Jonathan Giles for two-point conversion) OKST 56–53
- OKST 3:50 – James Washington 73 yard pass from J.W. Walsh (Ben Grogan kick) OKST 63–53
- OKST 0:06 – Ramon Richards 59 yard interception return (Ben Grogan kick) OKST 70–53

Leading Passers

- OKST – Mason Rudolph – 21/35, 285 yards, 2 TD, INT
- TTU – Patrick Mahomes – 38/55, 480 yards, 4 TD, 2 INT

Leading Rushers

- OKST – Raymond Taylor – 5 rushes, 58 yards, 2 TD
- TTU – DeAndré Washington – 22 rushes, 95 yards, TD

Leading Receivers

- OKST – James Washington – 4 receptions, 200 yards, 2 TD
- TTU – Jakeem Grant – 13 receptions, 178 yards, TD

The Red Raiders received the ball first, quickly scoring with a Patrick Mahomes 42 yard pass to Justin Stockton for a touchdown. Tech originally went for a 2-point conversion, but the pass fell incomplete; however, a defensive pass-interference call against Oklahoma State gave the Red Raiders another chance. Settling for a Clayton Hatfield PAT, Texas Tech took an early 7–0 lead in just under a minute. On their next possession, the Red Raiders were pinned against their own endzone with the ball on their 3-yard line. Mahomes connected with Jakeem Grant, who took the ball all the way to OSU's 7-yard line. Tech scored with another Mahomes pass to Stockton to extend their lead to 14–0 with 9:34 left in the 1st. A Mason Rudolph pass was intercepted by Dakota Allen, which led to a 42-yard field goal from Hatfield. Oklahoma State got their first score of the day with a 19-yard pass from Austin Hays to Blake Jarwin. With Ben Gorgan making the extra point, the Cowboys trailed 7–17 with 4:25 left in the 1st. On the ensuing kickoff, Grant took the ball and returned it 100 yards for a touchdown. With Hatfield's kick good, the Red Raiders extended their lead to 24–7. After a high scoring first quarter (a combined 38 points), Texas Tech led Oklahoma State 24–14.

Tech scored early in the 2nd quarter, with Mahomes connecting with Grant for a 12-yard touchdown reception. With Hatfield's kick good, the Red Raiders extended their lead to 31–14 with 11:35 left in the half. Midway through the 2nd quarter, Texas Tech defender Jah'Shawn Johnson was ejected from the game following a controversial targeting penalty. The Cowboys scored another touchdown with a Raymond Taylor 4 yard run, trailing 21–31 with 8:14 left in the half. At halftime, the Red Raiders led the Cowboys 38–28. Oklahoma State's offense took off late in the 3rd quarter, gaining their first lead of the day with a 28-yard touchdown run from Raymond Taylor. In the end, the Red Raiders fell to the Cowboys 53–70.

=== West Virginia ===
Week Ten: West Virginia vs. Texas Tech Red Raiders – Game summary

Quarter	1	2	3	4	Total
Red Raiders	7	7	3	9	26
Mountaineers	7	10	7	7	31

at Mountaineer Field Morgantown, West Virginia

- Date: November 7
- Game time: 11:00 a.m. CT/12:00 p.m. ET
- Game weather: 52 °F (11 °C), overcast
- TV: FS1

Game information

First quarter

- WVU 9:45 – Rushel Shell 5 yard run (Josh Lambert kick) WVU 7–0
- TTU 5:09 – Jakeem Grant 10 yard pass from Patrick Mahomes (Clayton Hatfield kick) tied 7–7

Second quarter

- WVU 13:29 – Wendell Smallwood 16 yard run (Josh Lambert kick) WVU 14–7
- TTU 0:35 – Reginald Davis 9 yard pass from Patrick Mahomes (Clayton Hatfield kick) tied 7–7
- WVU 0:00 – Josh Lambert 39 yard field goal WVU 17–14

Third quarter

- TTU 8:36 – Clayton Hatfield 34 yard field goal tied 17–17
- WVU 4:40 – Rushel Shell 3 yard run (Josh Lambert kick) WVU 24–17

Fourth quarter

- TTU 14:56 – Clayton Hatfield 27 yard field goal WVU 24–20
- WVU 11:28 – Skyler Howard 2 yard run (Josh Lambert kick) WVU 31–20
- TTU 6:47 – DeAndré Washington 17 yard pass from Patrick Mahomes WVU 31–26

Leading Passers

- TTU – Patrick Mahomes – 21/34, 196 yards, 3 TD, INT
- WVU – Skyler Howard – 12/23, 149 yards, 2 INT

Leading Rushers

- TTU – DeAndré Washington – 21 rushes, 102 yards
- WVU – Wendell Smallwood – 22 rushes, 163 yards, TD

Leading Receivers

- TTU – DeAndré Washington – 6 receptions, 64 yards, TD
- WVU – Kendell White – 5 receptions, 80 yards

=== Kansas State ===
Week Eleven: Kansas State Wildcats at Texas Tech Red Raiders – Game summary

Quarter	1	2	3	4	Total
Wildcats	7	14	7	16	44
Red Raiders	28	7	10	14	59

at Jones AT&T Stadium Lubbock, Texas

- Date: November 14
- Game time: 2:30 p.m. CST
- Game attendance: 53,833
- TV: FS1

Game information

First quarter

- TTU 12:08 – Justin Stockton 17 yard pass from Patrick Mahomes (Clayton Hatfield kick) TTU 7–0
- KSU 11:56 – Morgan Burns 93 yard kickoff return (Jack Cantele kick) tied 7–7
- TTU 10:15 – DeAndré Washington 5 yard run (Clayton Hatfield kick) TTU 14–7
- TTU 7:51 – DeAndré Washington 80 yard run (Clayton Hatfield kick) TTU 21–7
- TTU 4:47 – Justin Stockton 7 yard run (Clayton Hatfield kick) TTU 28–7

Second quarter

- KSU 6:02 – Joe Hubener 1 yard run (Jack Cantele kick) TTU 28–14
- TTU 3:43 – Devin Lauderdale 19 yard pass from Patrick Mahomes (Clayton Hatfield kick) TTU 35–14
- KSU 2:05 – Joe Hubener 1 yard run (Jack Cantele kick) TTU 35–21

Third quarter

- KSU 10:00 – Joe Hubener 1 yard run (Jack Cantele kick) TTU 35–28
- TTU 7:37 – Justin Stockton 20 yard pass from Patrick Mahomes (Clayton Hatfield kick) TTU 42–28
- TTU 5:14 – Clayton Hatfield 48 yard field goal TTU 45–28

Fourth quarter

- TTU 11:30 – Patrick Mahomes 4 yard run (Clayton Hatfield kick) TTU 52–28
- KSU 7:25 – Dominique Heath 6 yard pass from Joe Hubener TTU 52–34
- KSU 5:04 – Kyle Klein 33 yard pass from Joe Hubener (Jack Cantele kick) TTU 52–41
- KSU 3:38 – Jack Cantele 43 yard field goal TTU 52–44
- TTU 1:02 – DeAndré Washington 12 yard run (Clayton Hatfield kick) TTU 59–44

Leading Passers

- KSU – Joe Hubener – 19/41, 289 yards, 2 TD, INT
- TTU – Patrick Mahomes – 33/42, 384 yards, 3 TD

Leading Rushers

- KSU – Joe Hubener – 14 rushes, 9 yards, 3 TD
- TTU – DeAndré Washington – 27 carries, 248 yards, 3 TD

Leading Receivers

- KSU – Kyle Klein – 6 receptions, 131 yards, TD
- TTU – Devin Lauderdale – 10 receptions, 94 yards, TD

With the win, the Red Raiders broke a two-game losing streak against the Wildcats and became bowl eligible for the first time since the 2013 season. In the third quarter, kicker Clayton Hatfield made a season long 48 yard field goal.

=== Texas ===
Week Thirteen: Texas Longhorns vs. Texas Tech Red Raiders – Game summary

Quarter	1	2	3	4	Total
Red Raiders	0	17	10	21	48
Longhorns	0	10	14	21	45

at Darrell K Royal–Texas Memorial Stadium Austin, Texas

- Date: November 26
- Game time: 6:30 p.m. CT
- Game weather: 72 °F (22 °C), light rain
- Game attendance: 94,299
- TV: FS1

Game information

First quarter

- No scoring plays

Second quarter

- TEX 14:56 – Nick Rose 32 yard field goal TEX 3–0 (5 plays, 27 yards, 2:14)
- TTU 14:28 – Jakeem Grant 65 yard pass from Patrick Mahomes (Clayton Hatfield kick) TTU 7–3 (2 plays, 65 yards, 0:28)
- TTU 8:25 – Clayton Hatfield 51 yard field goal TTU 10–3 (7 plays, 29 yards, 2:22)
- TEX 5:59 – Chris Warren III 91 yard run (Nick Rose kick) tied 10–10 (1 play, 91 yards, 0:16)
- TTU 1:48 – Patrick Mahomes 1 yard run (Clayton Hatfield kick) TTU 17–10 (5 plays, 34 yards, 1:20)

Third quarter

- TTU 7:58 – DeAndré Washington 2 yard run (Clayton Hatfield kick) TTU 24–10 (12 plays, 91 yards, 3:34)
- TEX 5:47 – Chris Warren III 21 yard run (Nick Rose kick) TTU 24–17 (2 plays, 28 yards, 0:32)
- TTU 2:55 – Clayton Hatfield 38 yard field goal TTU 27–17 (6 plays, 49 yards, 2:52)
- TEX 1:36 – Chris Warren III 23 yard run (Nick Rose kick) TTU 27–24 (4 plays, 40 yards, 1:19)

Fourth quarter

- TTU 14:29 – DeAndré Washington 16 yard run (Clayton Hatfield kick) TTU 34–24 (7 plays, 75 yards, 2:07)
- TEX 11:10 – Tyrone Swoopes 1 yard run (Nick Rose kick) TTU 34–31 (8 plays, 77 yards, 3:19)
- TEX 7:54 – Tyrone Swoopes 46 yard run (Nick Rose kick) TEX 38–34 (4 plays, 69 yards, 1:13)
- TTU 6:18 – Justin Stockton 1 yard run (Clayton Hatfield kick) TTU 41–38 (6 plays, 75 yards, 1:36)
- TTU 2:41 – Jakeem Grant 40 yard run (Clayton Hatfield kick) TTU 48–38 (1 play, 40 yards, 0:10)
- TEX 2:06 – Chris Warren III 8 yard run (Nick Rose kick) TTU 48–45 (2 plays, 46 yards, 0:35)

Leading Passers

- TTU – Patrick Mahomes – 22/39, 372 yards, TD, INT
- TEX – Tyrone Swoopes – 9/18, 52 yards, INT

Leading Rushers

- TTU – DeAndré Washington – 28 rushes, 173 yards, 2 TD
- TEX – Chris Warren III – 25 rushes, 276 yards, 4 TD

Leading Receivers

- TTU – Jakeem Grant – 2 receptions, 105 yards, TD
- TEX – John Burt – 4 receptions, 23 yards

The Longhorns and Red Raiders completely shut each other out during the first quarter, with Texas getting the first points with a 32-yard field goal from Nick Rose. On the next drive, Texas Tech scored a touchdown after a Patrick Mahomes pass was intercepted by the Longhorns, before being knocked out of the defender's hands and being recovered by Jakeem Grant. Grant returned the ball into the end zone for the game's first touchdown. With Clayton Hatfield's kick good, the Red Raiders took a 7–3 lead early in the 2nd quarter. Hatfield made a career long 51 yard field goal midway through the 2nd quarter to extend Texas Tech's lead to 10–3. Kliff Kingsbury got his first win over Texas as the Red Raiders' head coach, beating the Longhorns 48–45.

=== Vs. No. 22 LSU (Texas Bowl) ===
Texas Tech Red Raiders vs. No. 22 LSU Tigers (2015 Texas Bowl) – Game summary

Quarter	1	2	3	4	Total
Red Raiders	6	7	7	7	27
No. 22 Tigers	14	7	21	14	56

at NRG Stadium, Houston, Texas

- Date: December 29
- Game time: 8:00 p.m. CST
- Game weather: None (retractable roof closed)
- Game attendance: 71,054
- Referee: Land Clark
- TV announcers (ESPN): Joe Tessitore, Jesse Palmer, David Pollack, and Maria Taylor
- Box score, Recap

Game information

First quarter

- LSU 11:47 – Leonard Fournette 2 yard run (Trent Domingue kick), LSU 7–0
- TTU 0:53 – Jakeem Grant 46 yard pass from Patrick Mahomes (two–point pass incomplete), LSU 7–6
- LSU 0:29 – D.J. Chark 79 yard run (Trent Domingue kick), LSU 14–6

Second quarter

- LSU 6:41 – Leonard Fournette 47 yard pass from Brandon Harris (Trent Domingue kick), LSU 21–6
- TTU 3:38 – Jakeem Grant 3 yard pass from Patrick Mahomes (Clayton Hatfield kick), LSU 21–13

Third quarter

- TTU 10:28 – Reginald Davis 31 yard pass from Patrick Mahomes (Clayton Hatfield kick), LSU 21–20
- LSU 8:17 – Leonard Fournette 43 yard run (Trent Domingue kick), LSU 28–20
- LSU 4:07 – Leonard Fournette 4 yard run (Trent Domingue kick), LSU 35–20
- LSU 0:09 – Brandon Harris 27 yard run (Trent Domingue kick), LSU 42–20

Fourth quarter

- TTU 12:20 – Jakeem Grant 4 yard pass from Patrick Mahomes (Clayton Hatfield kick), LSU 42–27
- LSU 8:16 – Leonard Fournette 2 yard run (Trent Domingue kick), LSU 49–27
- LSU 4:24 – Darrel Williams 2 yard run (Trent Domingue kick), LSU 56–27

Leading Passers

- TTU – Patrick Mahomes – 28/56, 370 yards, 4 TD, INT
- LSU – Brandon Harris – 14/23, 261 yards, TD, INT

Leading Rushers

- TTU – DeAndré Washington – 10 rushes, 37 yards
- LSU – Leonard Fournette – 29 rushes, 212 yards, 4 TD

Leading Receivers

- TTU – Jakeem Grant – 10 receptions, 125 yards, 3 TD
- LSU – Malachi Dupre – 4 receptions, 96 yards

== Statistics ==
=== Scores against all opponents ===
	1	2	3	4	Total
Opponents	121	155	85	146	507
Texas Tech	155	174	98	136	563

=== Scores against the Big 12 ===
	1	2	3	4	Total
Opponents	93	114	82	129	418
Texas Tech	110	118	64	108	400

== 2016 NFL draftees ==
Player	Round	Pick	Position	NFL Club
Le'Raven Clark	3	82	Offensive tackle	Indianapolis Colts
