= 2015 West Virginia Mountaineers football team =

American college football season

2015 West Virginia Mountaineers football

Cactus Bowl champion

Cactus Bowl, W 43–42 vs. Arizona State
- Conference: Big 12 Conference
- Record: 8–5 (4–5 Big 12)
- Head coach: Dana Holgorsen (5th season)
- Offensive scheme: Spread
- Defensive coordinator: Tony Gibson (2nd season)
- Base defense: 3–3–5
- Home stadium: Mountaineer Field at Milan Puskar Stadium

2015 Big 12 Conference football standings
	Conf.			Overall
Team	W		L	W		L
No. 5 Oklahoma $^	8	–	1	11	–	2
No. 20 Oklahoma State	7	–	2	10	–	3
No. 7 TCU	7	–	2	11	–	2
No. 13 Baylor	6	–	3	10	–	3
West Virginia	4	–	5	8	–	5
Texas Tech	4	–	5	7	–	6
Texas	4	–	5	5	–	7
Kansas State	3	–	6	6	–	7
Iowa State	2	–	7	3	–	9
Kansas	0	–	9	0	–	12
^ – College Football Playoff participant; $ – Conference champion; Rankings from AP Poll

The 2015 West Virginia Mountaineers football team represented West Virginia University in the 2015 NCAA Division I FBS football season. Playing as a member of the Big 12 Conference (Big 12), the team was led by head coach Dana Holgorsen, in his fifth year. West Virginia played its home games at Mountaineer Field at Milan Puskar Stadium in Morgantown, West Virginia. They finished the season 8–5, 4–5 in Big 12 play to finish in a three way tie for fifth place. They were invited to the Cactus Bowl where they defeated Arizona State

== Schedule ==
West Virginia announced their 2015 football schedule on November 19, 2014. The 2015 schedule consist of 7 home and 5 away games in the regular season. The Mountaineers will host Big 12 foes Iowa State, Oklahoma State, Texas, and Texas Tech. West Virginia will travel to Baylor, Kansas, Kansas State, Oklahoma, and TCU.

The Mountaineers hosted all three non conference games against Georgia Southern, Liberty and also hosted rival Maryland.

Date	Time	Opponent	Rank	Site	TV	Result	Attendance
September 5	7:30 p.m.	Georgia Southern*		Mountaineer Field; Morgantown, WV	FSN	W 44–0	55,182
September 12	3:00 p.m.	No. 15 (FCS) Liberty*		Mountaineer Field; Morgantown, WV	RTPT	W 41–17	52,899
September 26	3:00 p.m.	Maryland*		Mountaineer Field; Morgantown, WV (Gold Rush) (rivalry)	FS1	W 45–6	61,174
October 3	Noon	at No. 15 Oklahoma	No. 23	Gaylord Family Oklahoma Memorial Stadium; Norman, OK	FS1	L 24–44	84,384
October 10	7:00 p.m.	No. 21 Oklahoma State^{†}		Mountaineer Field; Morgantown, WV (Stripe the Stadium)	ESPN2	L 26–33 ^{OT}	60,410
October 17	Noon	at No. 2 Baylor		McLane Stadium; Waco, TX	FOX	L 38–62	45,370
October 29	7:30 p.m.	at No. 5 TCU		Amon G. Carter Stadium; Fort Worth, TX	FS1	L 10–40	45,947
November 7	Noon	Texas Tech		Mountaineer Field; Morgantown, WV	FS1	W 31–26	54,932
November 14	Noon	Texas		Mountaineer Field; Morgantown, WV (True Blue)	ESPNU	W 38–20	56,736
November 21	Noon	at Kansas		Memorial Stadium; Lawrence, KS	FSN	W 49–0	21,415
November 28	Noon	Iowa State		Mountaineer Field; Morgantown, WV	FS1	W 30–6	42,446
December 5	4:30 p.m.	at Kansas State		Bill Snyder Family Football Stadium; Manhattan, KS	FS1	L 23–24	52,918
January 2, 2016	10:45 p.m.	vs. Arizona State*		Chase Field; Phoenix, AZ (Cactus Bowl)	ESPN	W 43–42	39,321
*Non-conference game; ^{†}Homecoming; Rankings from AP Poll released prior to game; All times are in Eastern time

Schedule source:

== Game summaries ==
=== Georgia Southern ===
	1	2	3	4	Total
Eagles	0	0	0	0	0
Mountaineers	10	6	14	14	44

=== Liberty ===
	1	2	3	4	Total
Flames	0	0	7	10	17
Mountaineers	6	14	14	7	41

=== Maryland ===
	1	2	3	4	Total
Terrapins	0	0	0	6	6
Mountaineers	21	17	0	7	45

=== Oklahoma ===
	1	2	3	4	Total
#23 Mountaineers	0	7	17	0	24
#15 Sooners	7	17	10	10	44

=== Oklahoma State ===
	1	2	3	4	OT	Total
#21 Cowboys	7	10	6	3	7	33
Mountaineers	0	2	14	10	0	26

=== Baylor ===
	1	2	3	4	Total
Mountaineers	7	10	7	14	38
#2 Bears	17	10	21	14	62

=== TCU ===
	1	2	3	4	Total
Mountaineers	0	10	0	0	10
#5 Horned Frogs	17	6	14	3	40

=== Texas Tech ===
	1	2	3	4	Total
Red Raiders	7	7	3	9	26
Mountaineers	7	10	7	7	31

=== Texas ===
	1	2	3	4	Total
Longhorns	10	0	7	3	20
Mountaineers	7	14	7	10	38

=== Kansas ===
	1	2	3	4	Total
Mountaineers	28	14	7	0	49
Jayhawks	0	0	0	0	0

=== Iowa State ===
	1	2	3	4	Total
Cyclones	0	6	0	0	6
Mountaineers	7	6	10	7	30

=== Kansas State ===
	1	2	3	4	Total
Mountaineers	3	10	7	3	23
Wildcats	0	3	14	7	24

=== Arizona State–Cactus Bowl ===
	1	2	3	4	Total
Mountaineers	9	13	14	7	43
Sun Devils	3	15	14	10	42

== Rankings ==
Ranking movements Legend: ██ Increase in ranking ██ Decrease in ranking — = Not ranked RV = Received votes
	Week															
Poll	Pre	1	2	3	4	5	6	7	8	9	10	11	12	13	14	Final
AP	RV	RV	RV	RV	23	RV	—	—	—	—	—	—	RV	RV	—	—
Coaches	RV	RV	RV	RV	21	RV	RV	—	—	—	—	—	RV	RV	—	RV
CFP	Not released									—	—	—	—	—	—	Not released
