= 2015 Oklahoma Sooners football team =

American college football season

2015 Oklahoma Sooners football

Big 12 champion

Orange Bowl (CFP Semifinal), L 17–37 vs. Clemson
- Conference: Big 12 Conference

Ranking
- Coaches: No. 5
- AP: No. 5
- Record: 11–2 (8–1 Big 12)
- Head coach: Bob Stoops (17th season)
- Offensive coordinator: Lincoln Riley (1st season)
- Offensive scheme: Air raid
- Defensive coordinator: Mike Stoops (9th season)
- Base defense: 3–4
- Captains: Trevor Knight; Ty Darlington; Nila Kasitati; Eric Striker; Charles Tapper
- Home stadium: Gaylord Family Oklahoma Memorial Stadium

2015 Big 12 Conference football standings
	Conf.			Overall
Team	W		L	W		L
No. 5 Oklahoma $^	8	–	1	11	–	2
No. 20 Oklahoma State	7	–	2	10	–	3
No. 7 TCU	7	–	2	11	–	2
No. 13 Baylor	6	–	3	10	–	3
West Virginia	4	–	5	8	–	5
Texas Tech	4	–	5	7	–	6
Texas	4	–	5	5	–	7
Kansas State	3	–	6	6	–	7
Iowa State	2	–	7	3	–	9
Kansas	0	–	9	0	–	12
^ – College Football Playoff participant; $ – Conference champion; Rankings from AP Poll

The 2015 Oklahoma Sooners football team represented the University of Oklahoma in the 2015 NCAA Division I FBS football season, the 121st season of Sooner football. The team was led by two-time Walter Camp Coach of the Year Award winner, Bob Stoops, in his 17th season as head coach. They played their home games at Gaylord Family Oklahoma Memorial Stadium in Norman, Oklahoma. They were a charter member of the Big 12 Conference.

Conference play began on October 3, 2015, with a 44–24 win against West Virginia in Norman, Oklahoma and ended with a 58–23 win against Oklahoma State in Stillwater, Oklahoma on November 28, 2015. Oklahoma finished conference play with an 8–1 record winning their ninth Big 12 Championship, their first since 2012.

Oklahoma was selected as the 4th seed to play in the 2015 College Football playoff against 1st seed Clemson on December 31, 2015, in the Orange Bowl which they lost 17–37. Oklahoma finished the season with an 11–2 record.

== Preseason ==
=== Recruits ===
College recruiting
Name	Hometown	School	Height	Weight	40^{‡}	Commit date
Rodney Anderson; RB	Katy, Texas	Katy HS	6 ft 1 in (1.85 m)	205 lb (93 kg)	4.63	Jun 8, 2014
Rodney Anderson; RB	Recruit ratings: Scout: Rivals: 247Sports: ESPN:					
Gabriel Campbell; DE	Yazoo City, Mississippi	Yazoo City HS	6 ft 5 in (1.96 m)	250 lb (110 kg)	4.70	Jan 6, 2015
Gabriel Campbell; DE	Recruit ratings: Scout: Rivals: 247Sports: ESPN:					
Jamal Danley; OG	Byhalia, Mississippi	East Mississippi CC	6 ft 5 in (1.96 m)	310 lb (140 kg)	5.03	Sep 13, 2014
Jamal Danley; OG	Recruit ratings: Scout: Rivals: 247Sports: ESPN:					
Ricky DeBerry; DE	Mechanicsville, Virginia	Atlee HS	6 ft 2 in (1.88 m)	235 lb (107 kg)	4.58	Dec 19, 2014
Ricky DeBerry; DE	Recruit ratings: Scout: Rivals: 247Sports: ESPN:					
Bobby Evans; OT	Allen, Texas	Allen HS	6 ft 4 in (1.93 m)	260 lb (120 kg)	N/A	Jul 10, 2013
Bobby Evans; OT	Recruit ratings: Scout: Rivals: 247Sports: ESPN:					
Cody Ford; OG	Pineville, Louisiana	Pineville HS	6 ft 4 in (1.93 m)	314 lb (142 kg)	5.09	Aug 11, 2014
Cody Ford; OG	Recruit ratings: Scout: Rivals: 247Sports: ESPN:					
Neville Gallimore; DT	St. Catharines, Ontario	Canada Prep Football Academy	6 ft 3 in (1.91 m)	311 lb (141 kg)	4.70	Jan 3, 2015
Neville Gallimore; DT	Recruit ratings: Scout: Rivals: 247Sports: ESPN:					
Dahu Green; WR	Oklahoma City, Oklahoma	Westmoore HS	6 ft 4 in (1.93 m)	191 lb (87 kg)	4.54	Feb 2, 2015
Dahu Green; WR	Recruit ratings: Scout: Rivals: 247Sports: ESPN:					
Kahlil Haughton; S	Waco, Texas	Midway HS	6 ft 1 in (1.85 m)	180 lb (82 kg)	4.41	Dec 19, 2014
Kahlil Haughton; S	Recruit ratings: Scout: Rivals: 247Sports: ESPN:					
Dominique Hearne; OG	Lancaster, Texas	Lancaster HS	6 ft 4 in (1.93 m)	288 lb (131 kg)	5.13	Jun 12, 2014
Dominique Hearne; OG	Recruit ratings: Scout: Rivals: 247Sports: ESPN:					
John Humphrey, Jr. WR	League City, Texas	Clear Falls HS	5 ft 11 in (1.80 m)	162 lb (73 kg)	4.40	Aug 3, 2014
John Humphrey, Jr. WR	Recruit ratings: Scout: Rivals: 247Sports: ESPN:					
William Johnson; CB	Baltimore, Maryland	Monroe College	6 ft 0 in (1.83 m)	185 lb (84 kg)	N/A	Nov 23, 2014
William Johnson; CB	Recruit ratings: Scout: Rivals: 247Sports: ESPN:					
Kenneth Mann; DE	Burleson, Texas	Burleson HS	6 ft 4 in (1.93 m)	245 lb (111 kg)	4.70	Jul 23, 2014
Kenneth Mann; DE	Recruit ratings: Scout: Rivals: 247Sports: ESPN:					
P. J. Mbanasor; CB	Pflugerville, Texas	Hendrickson HS	6 ft 1 in (1.85 m)	183 lb (83 kg)	4.64	Jun 3, 2014
P. J. Mbanasor; CB	Recruit ratings: Scout: Rivals: 247Sports: ESPN:					
Arthur McGinnis; OLB	New Orleans, Louisiana	Warren Easton HS	6 ft 2 in (1.88 m)	228 lb (103 kg)	4.47	Feb 3, 2015
Arthur McGinnis; OLB	Recruit ratings: Scout: Rivals: 247Sports: ESPN:					
Prentice McKinney, Jr. S	Dallas, Texas	South Oak Cliff HS	6 ft 2 in (1.88 m)	180 lb (82 kg)	4.48	Feb 4, 2015
Prentice McKinney, Jr. S	Recruit ratings: Scout: Rivals: 247Sports: ESPN:					
A. D. Miller; WR	Dallas, Texas	Bishop Dunne HS	6 ft 3 in (1.91 m)	175 lb (79 kg)	4.50	Feb 1, 2015
A. D. Miller; WR	Recruit ratings: Scout: Rivals: 247Sports: ESPN:					
Marquise Overton; DT	Jenks, Oklahoma	Jenks HS	6 ft 1 in (1.85 m)	301 lb (137 kg)	5.51	Jan 3, 2014
Marquise Overton; DT	Recruit ratings: Scout: Rivals: 247Sports: ESPN:					
Dru Samia; OG	Danville, California	San Ramon Valley HS	6 ft 6 in (1.98 m)	296 lb (134 kg)	5.48	Aug 22, 2014
Dru Samia; OG	Recruit ratings: Scout: Rivals: 247Sports: ESPN:					
Austin Seibert; K	Belleville, Illinois	Belleville West HS	5 ft 10 in (1.78 m)	195 lb (88 kg)	N/A	May 9, 2014
Austin Seibert; K	Recruit ratings: Scout: Rivals: 247Sports: ESPN:					
Antoine Stephens; CB	Dallas, Texas	Justin F. Kimball HS	6 ft 1 in (1.85 m)	187 lb (85 kg)	4.54	Jan 18, 2015
Antoine Stephens; CB	Recruit ratings: Scout: Rivals: 247Sports: ESPN:					
Will Sunderland, Jr. S	Midwest City, Oklahoma	Midwest City HS	6 ft 2 in (1.88 m)	190 lb (86 kg)	4.58	Sep 13, 2014
Will Sunderland, Jr. S	Recruit ratings: Scout: Rivals: 247Sports: ESPN:					
Dede Westbrook; WR	Cameron, Texas	Blinn College	6 ft 1 in (1.85 m)	175 lb (79 kg)	4.38	Nov 25, 2014
Dede Westbrook; WR	Recruit ratings: Scout: Rivals: 247Sports: ESPN:					
Overall recruit ranking: Scout: 14 Rivals: 14 247Sports: 15 ESPN: 17
‡ Refers to 40-yard dash; Note: In many cases, Scout, Rivals, 247Sports, On3, and ESPN may conflict in their listings of height, weight and 40 time.; In these cases, the average was taken. ESPN grades are on a 100-point scale.; Sources: "2015 Oklahoma Football Commitment List". Rivals.; "2015 Oklahoma Commits". Scout.; "2015 Player Commitments – Oklahoma". ESPN.; "Scout.com Team Recruiting Rankings". Scout.; "2015 Team Ranking". Rivals.com.

=== Award watch lists ===
- Lombardi Award

Dominique Alexander
Eric Striker

- Jim Thorpe Award

Zack Sanchez

- Butkus Award

Dominique Alexander
Erik Striker

- Maxwell Award

Baker Mayfield
Samaje Perine
Sterling Shepard

- Rimington Trophy

Ty Darlington

- Outland Trophy

Ty Darlington

- Chuck Bednarik Award

Zack Sanchez
Erik Striker
Charles Tapper

- Walter Camp Award

Samaje Perine

- Biletnikoff Award

Sterling Shepard

- Bronko Nagurski Trophy

Dominique Alexander
Zack Sanchez
Erik Striker
Charles Tapper

- Doak Walker Award

Samaje Perine

== Schedule ==
Oklahoma announced its 2015 football schedule on November 19, 2014. The 2015 schedule consisted of six home games, five away games and one neutral game in the regular season. The Sooners hosted Big 12 foes Iowa State, TCU, Texas Tech, and West Virginia and traveled to Baylor, Kansas, Kansas State, and Oklahoma State. Oklahoma played Texas in Dallas, Texas at the Cotton Bowl for the 110th time on October 10 for the Red River Showdown.

The Sooners hosted two non-conference games against Akron and Tulsa and traveled to its other non-conference foe Tennessee in Knoxville, Tennessee. Oklahoma met for the first time against the Akron Zips at home to open the season. The Sooners then traveled to Tennessee after defeating the Tennessee Volunteers last season and then hosted in-state rival Tulsa after traveling to Tulsa last year.

Date	Time	Opponent	Rank	Site	TV	Result	Attendance
September 5	6:00 p.m.	Akron*	No. 19	Gaylord Family Oklahoma Memorial Stadium; Norman, OK	FSOK PPV	W 41–3	85,370
September 12	5:00 p.m.	at No. 23 Tennessee*	No. 19	Neyland Stadium; Knoxville, TN	ESPN	W 31–24 ^{2OT}	102,455
September 19	11:00 a.m.	Tulsa*	No. 16	Gaylord Family Oklahoma Memorial Stadium; Norman, OK	FS1	W 52–38	85,657
October 3	11:00 a.m.	No. 23 West Virginia	No. 15	Gaylord Family Oklahoma Memorial Stadium; Norman, OK	FS1	W 44–24	84,384
October 10	11:00 a.m.	vs. Texas	No. 10	Cotton Bowl; Dallas, TX (Red River Showdown)	ABC	L 17–24	91,546
October 17	2:30 p.m.	at Kansas State	No. 19	Bill Snyder Family Football Stadium; Manhattan, KS	ABC	W 55–0	52,867
October 24	2:30 p.m.	Texas Tech^{†}	No. 17	Gaylord Family Oklahoma Memorial Stadium; Norman, OK	ABC/ESPN2	W 63–27	85,312
October 31	2:30 p.m.	at Kansas	No. 14	Memorial Stadium; Lawrence, KS	FS1	W 62–7	26,677
November 7	6:00 p.m.	Iowa State	No. 15	Gaylord Family Oklahoma Memorial Stadium; Norman, OK	ESPNU	W 52–16	85,595
November 14	7:00 p.m.	at No. 6 Baylor	No. 12	McLane Stadium; Waco, TX (College GameDay)	ABC	W 44–34	49,875
November 21	7:00 p.m.	No. 18 TCU	No. 7	Gaylord Family Oklahoma Memorial Stadium; Norman, OK	ABC	W 30–29	85,821
November 28	7:00 p.m.	at No. 11 Oklahoma State	No. 3	Boone Pickens Stadium; Stillwater, OK (Bedlam Series / College GameDay)	ABC	W 58–23	58,231
December 31	3:00 p.m.	vs. No. 1 Clemson*	No. 4	Sun Life Stadium; Miami Gardens, FL (Orange Bowl–CFP Semifinal / College GameDay)	ESPN	L 17–37	67,615
*Non-conference game; ^{†}Homecoming; Rankings from AP Poll and CFP Rankings after November 3 released prior to game; All times are in Central time

== Roster ==
2015 Oklahoma Sooners football team roster
Players
Coaches
Offense

Pos.	#	Name	Class
WR	1	Jarvis Baxter	Jr
WR	2	John Humphrey	Fr
WR	3	Sterling Shepard	Sr
QB	4	Reece Clark	Fr
WR	5	Durron Neal	Sr
QB	6	Baker Mayfield	Jr
QB	9	Trevor Knight (C)	Jr
WR	11	Dede Westbrook	Jr
QB	12	Connor McGinnis	Fr
WR	13	A. D. Miller	Fr
QB	14	Cody Thomas	So
WR	15	Jeffery Mead	So
WR	16	Michiah Quick	So
WR	17	Jordan Smallwood	So
WR	18	Dahu Green	Fr
WR	19	Dallis Todd	Fr
RB	20	Tion Grant	So
RB	24	Rodney Anderson	Fr
RB	25	Joe Mixon	Fr
RB	28	Alex Ross	Jr
RB	32	Samaje Perine	So
RB	33	Anthony Sheppard	Fr
RB	34	Daniel Brooks	Jr
FB	36	Dimitri Flowers	So
FB	44	Jaxon Uhles	So
TE	45	Carson Meier	Fr
OL	52	Jamal Danley	Jr
OL	54	Nila Kasitati (C)	Sr
OL	55	Josiah St. John	Sr
OL	56	Ty Darlington (C)	Sr
OL	58	Erick Wren	So
OL	63	Alex Dalton	Fr
OL	64	Dylan Hartsook	Jr
OL	65	Nick Hardaway	So
OL	66	Riley Nolan	Jr
OL	68	Jonathan Alvarez	So
OL	69	Quinn Mittermeier	So
OL	70	Christian Daimler	So
OL	71	Bobby Evans	Fr
OL	72	Derek Farniok	Sr
OL	73	Kenyon Frison	Fr
OL	74	Cody Ford	Fr
OL	75	Dru Samia	Fr
OL	76	Sam Grant	Jr
OL	77	Joseph Paul	Fr
OL	78	Orlando Brown Jr.	Fr
OL	79	Dominique Hearne	Fr
WR	80	Sam Iheke	Fr
TE	81	Mark Andrews	Fr
WR	82	Ezel McIntee	Fr
WR	83	Nick Basquine	Fr
WR	84	Grant Bothun	Jr
WR	85	Vance Galloway	Fr
WR	86	Lee Morris	Fr
WR	87	Parker Fentriss	Fr
WR	88	Eric DeLay	Fr
TE	89	Connor Knight	Jr

Defense

Pos.	#	Name	Class
LB	1	Dominique Alexander	Jr
DB	2	P. J. Mbanasor	Fr
DB	4	Hatari Byrd	Jr
DB	5	Antoine Stevens	Fr
DB	6	Stanvon Taylor	Jr
DB	7	Jordan Thomas	So
DB	8	Kahlil Haughton	Fr
LB	9	Tay Evans	Fr
DB	10	Steven Parker	So
DB	12	William Johnson	So
DB	13	Ahmad Thomas	Jr
DB	14	Marcus Green	Fr
DB	15	Zack Sanchez	Jr
LB	18	Curtis Bolton	Fr
LB	19	Eric Striker (C)	Sr
LB	20	Frank Shannon	Sr
DB	21	Will Sunderland	Fr
LB	22	Ricky DeBerry	Fr
LB	23	Devante Bond	Sr
LB	26	Jordan Evans	Jr
DB	27	Dakota Austin	Jr
DB	29	Prentice McKinney	Fr
DB	30	Ernest Gardner	Fr
LB	31	Ogbonnia Okoronkwo	So
DB	35	Cole Swayze	Sr
DB	36	Abdul Eissa	Sr
DB	37	Anuar Hage	Fr
DB	38	Najee Bissoon	So
DB	39	Darius Owens	So
LB	40	P. L. Lindley	Sr
DB	41	Jesse Walker	So
LB	42	Ruben Hunter	So
DE	46	Gabriel Campbell	Fr
DT	50	Courtney Garnett	Fr
LB	50	Arthur McGinnis	Fr
LB	51	Cade Newhouse–Parker	So
DE	55	Kenneth Mann	Fr
DT	57	Du'Vonta Lampkin	Fr
DT	58	Chase Frazier	So
DT	59	Kane Snowden	Jr
DE	80	Isaac Ijalana	So
LB	84	Dalton Rodriguez	So
DE	87	D. J. Ward	So
DT	90	Neville Gallimore	Fr
DE	91	Charles Tapper (C)	Sr
DT	92	Matthew Romar	So
DT	93	Jordan Wade	Jr
DT	94	Matt Dimon	Jr
DE	95	Austin Roberts	Jr
DE	96	Mitch Tate	Sr
DT	97	Charles Walker	So
DT	98	Marquise Overton	Fr
DE	99	Dwayne Orso–Bacchus	Fr

Special teams

Pos.	#	Name	Class
K	36	Kyle Pfau	So
P	38	Jack Steed	Jr
K	39	Nick Hodgson	Sr
LS	42	Wesley Horky	So
K	43	Austin Seibert	Fr
K	47	Eric Hosek	Sr
LS	57	Jack Aubel	Fr

Head coach

- Bob Stoops (17th season)

Coordinators/assistant coaches

- Lincoln Riley – Offensive coordinator / quarterbacks
- Cale Gundy – Assistant head coach / inside receivers / director of recruiting
- Dennis Simmons – Outside receivers
- Bill Bedenbaugh – Offensive line
- Jay Boulware – Running backs / Fullbacks / special teams coordinator
- Mike Stoops – Associate head coach / defensive coordinator / Outside Linebackers
- Tim Kish – Inside linebackers
- Kerry Cooks – Defensive backs
- Diron Reynolds - Defensive line
- Jerry Schmidt – Director of sports enhancement
- Matt McMillen – Assistant a. d. football operations
- Merv Johnson – Director of football operations
- Austin Woods – Offensive quality control
- C. J. Ah You - Defensive quality control / Special Teams Quality Control
- Ryan Allgood - Offensive Graduate Assistant
- Tyler Tettleton – Offensive graduate assistant
- Courtney Viney - Defensive Graduate Assistant

Legend

- (C) Team captain
- (S) Suspended
- (I) Ineligible
- Injured
- Redshirt

Roster
Last update: October 5, 2015

== Game summaries ==
=== Akron ===
Akron Zips at #19 Oklahoma Sooners – Game summary

Quarter	1	2	3	4	Total
Akron	0	3	0	0	3
#19 Oklahoma	3	14	21	3	41

at Gaylord Family Oklahoma Memorial Stadium • Norman, OK

- Date: September 5, 2015
- Game time: 6:06 p.m. CDT
- Game weather: Temperature: 91 °F (33 °C) • Wind: S 15 • Weather: Mostly Sunny
- Game attendance: 85,370
- Referee: Referee: Eddy Shelton • Umpire: Rick Podraza • Linesman: Rick Smith • Line judge: Keith Garmond • Back judge: Terry White • Field judge: Nick Lave • Side judge: Jim Murphy • Center judge: Vidal Jones
- TV announcers (FSOK PPV): Ron Thulin (Play-by-play), Dave Lapham (Color) & Chad McKee (Sideline)

Game information

First Quarter

- OU – 03:58 Austin Seibert 35 yd field goal (OU 3–0)

Second Quarter

- OU – 05:32 Samaje Perine 2 yd run, Austin Seibert XP good (OU 10–0)
- OU – 02:21 DeDe Westbrook 29 yd pass from Baker Mayfield, Austin Seibert XP good (OU 17–0)
- AKR – 00:06 Robert Stein 26 yd field goal (OU 17–3)

Third Quarter

- OU – 11:56 Joe Mixon 76 yd pass from Baker Mayfield, Austin Seibert XP good (OU 24–3)
- OU – 07:11 Jeffery Mead 11 yd pass from Baker Mayfield, Austin Seibert XP good (OU 31–3)
- OU – 02:36 Baker Mayfield 2 yd run, Austin Seibert XP good (OU 38–3)

Fourth Quarter

- OU – 10:29 Austin Seibert 41 yd field goal (OU 41–3)

Top Passers

- AKR – Kyle Pohl 6/17, 88 yards
- OU – Baker Mayfield 23/33, 388 yards, 3 TD

Top Rushers

- AKR – Tra'Von Chapman 14 attempts, 48 yards
- OU – Samaje Perine 11 attempts, 33 yards, 1 TD

Top Receiving

- AKR – Jerome Lane 3 receptions, 57 yards
- OU – Joe Mixon 3 receptions, 115 yards, 1 TD

Top Tacklers

- AKR – Dylan Evans 13 tackles
- OU – Dominique Alexander 10 tackles

=== Tennessee ===
#19 Oklahoma Sooners at #23 Tennessee Volunteers – Game summary

Quarter	1	2	3	4	OT	2OT	Total
#19 Oklahoma	0	3	0	14	7	7	31
#23 Tennessee	10	7	0	0	7	0	24

at Neyland Stadium • Knoxville, TN

- Date: September 12, 2015
- Game time: 6:01 p.m. EDT
- Game weather: Temperature: 72 °F (22 °C) • Wind: NW 8 • Weather: Partly Cloudy
- Game attendance: 102,455
- Referee: Referee: Mike Defee • Umpire: Richard Richeson • Linesman: Al Green • Line judge: Quentin Givens • Back judge: Terry Jones • Field judge: Joe Blubaugh • Side judge: Lo van Pham • Scorer: Mike Cuttone
- TV announcers (ESPN): Brad Nessler (Play-by-play), Todd Blackledge (Color) & Holly Rowe (Sideline)

Game information

First Quarter

- UT – 09:51 Aaron Medley 19 yd field goal (UT 3–0)
- UT – 01:56 Josh Malone 9 yd pass from Joshua Dobbs, Aaron Medley XP good (UT 10–0)

Second Quarter

- UT – 12:14 Joshua Dobbs 4 yd run, Aaron Medley XP good (UT 17–0)
- OU – 04:56 Austin Seibert 35 yd field goal (UT 17–3)

Fourth Quarter

- OU – 08:20 Samaje Perine 2 yd pass from Baker Mayfield, Austin Seibert XP good (UT 17–10)
- OU – 00:40 Sterling Shepard 5 yd pass from Baker Mayfield, Austin Seibert XP good (Tied 17–17)

First Overtime

- UT – 15:00 Jalen Hurd 8 yd run, Aaron Medley XP good (UT 24–17)
- OU – 15:00 Baker Mayfield 1 yd run, Austin Seibert XP good (Tied 24–24)

Second Overtime

- OU – 15:00 Sterling Shepard 18 yd pass from Baker Mayfield, Austin Seibert XP good (OU 31–24)

Top Passers

- OU – Baker Mayfield 19/39, 187 yards, 3 TD, 2 INT
- UT – Joshua Dobbs 13/31, 125 yards, 1 TD, 1 INT

Top Rushers

- OU – Samaje Perine 23 attempts, 78 yards
- UT – Jalen Hurd 24 attempts, 106 yards, 1 TD

Top Receiving

- OU – Sterling Shepard 7 receptions, 74 yards, 2 TD
- UT – Josh Smith 4 receptions, 56 yards

Top Tacklers

- OU – Ahmad Thomas 11 tackles
- UT – Jalen Reeves–Maybin 21 tackles

=== Tulsa ===
Tulsa Golden Hurricane at #16 Oklahoma Sooners – Game summary

Quarter	1	2	3	4	Total
Tulsa	3	21	7	7	38
#16 Oklahoma	17	14	14	7	52

at Gaylord Family Oklahoma Memorial Stadium • Norman, OK

- Date: September 19, 2015
- Game time: 11:05 a.m. CDT
- Game weather: Temperature: 65 °F (18 °C) • Wind: NE 18 • Weather: Cloudy
- Game attendance: 85,657
- Referee: Referee: Brad Van Vark • Umpire: Michael Cooper • Linesman: George Gusman • Line judge: Jerod Phillips • Back judge: Gene Semko • Field judge: Lason Ledet • Side judge: Gene Semko • Center judge: Brian Alos
- TV announcers (FS1): Tim Brando (Play-by-play), Spencer Tillman (Color) & Bruce Feldman (Sideline)

Game information

First Quarter

- OU – 12:03 Austin Seibert 20 yd field goal (OU 3–0)
- TUL – 08:04 Redford Jones 23 yd field goal (Tied 3–3)
- OU – 04:54 Baker Mayfield 39 yd run, Austin Seibert XP good (OU 10–3)
- OU – 01:18 Joe Mixon 10 yd pass from Baker Mayfield, Austin Seibert XP good (OU 17–3)

Second Quarter

- OU – 13:31 Baker Mayfield 8 yd run, Austin Seibert XP good (OU 24–3)
- TUL – 06:20 Josh Atkinson 18 yd pass from Dane Evans, Redford Jones XP good (OU 24–10)
- OU – 03:14 Mark Andrews 61 yd pass from Baker Mayfield, Austin Seibert XP good (OU 31–10)
- TUL – 00:13 Keevan Lucas 28 yd pass from Dane Evans, Redford Jones XP good (OU 31–17)
- TUL – 00:01 Keyarris Garrett 43 yd pass from Dane Evans, Redford Jones XP good (OU 31–24)

Third Quarter

- OU – 06:47 Jarvis Baxter 29 yd pass from Baker Mayfield, Austin Seibert XP good (OU 38–24)
- TUL – 04:01 Zack Langer 1 yd run, Redford Jones XP good (OU 38–31)
- OU – 00:40 Mark Andrews 17 yd pass from Baker Mayfield, Austin Seibert XP good (OU 45–31)

Fourth Quarter

- OU – 04:28 Samaje Perine 20 yd run, Austin Seibert XP good (OU 52–31)
- TUL – 03:38 Keevan Lucas 40 yd pass from Dane Evans, Redford Jones XP good (OU 52–38)

Top Passers

- TUL – Dane Evans 34/51, 427 yards, 4 TD
- OU – Baker Mayfield 32/38, 487 yards, 4 TD

Top Rushers

- TUL – Zack Langer 31 attempts, 161 yards, 1 TD
- OU – Samaje Perine 22 attempts, 151 yards, 1 TD

Top Receiving

- TUL – Keyarris Garrett 14 receptions, 189 yards, 1 TD
- OU – Sterling Shepard 8 receptions, 144 yards

Top Tacklers

- TUL – Michael Mudoh 16 tackles
- OU – Hatari Byrd 15 tackles

=== West Virginia ===
#23 West Virginia Mountaineers at #15 Oklahoma Sooners – Game summary

Quarter	1	2	3	4	Total
#23 West Virginia	0	7	17	0	24
#15 Oklahoma	7	17	10	10	44

at Gaylord Family Oklahoma Memorial Stadium • Norman, OK

- Date: October 3, 2015
- Game time: 11:05 a.m. CDT
- Game weather: Temperature: 60 °F (16 °C) • Wind: ENE 8 • Weather: Sunny
- Game attendance: 84,384
- Referee: Referee: Alan Eck • Umpire: Tab Slaughter • Linesman: Cal McNeill • Line judge: Kelly Deterding • Back judge: Donnie Aultman • Field judge: Scott Gaines • Side judge: Anthony Fleming • Center judge: Chris Tallent
- TV announcers (FS1): Joe Davis (Play-by-play), Brady Quinn (Color) & Kris Budden (Sideline)

Game information

First Quarter

- OU – 08:45 Mark Andrews 17 yd pass from Baker Mayfield, Austin Seibert XP good (OU 7–0)

Second Quarter

- WVU – 14:45 Rushel Shell 5 yd run, Josh Lambert XP good (Tied 7–7)
- OU – 14:04 Sterling Shepard 28 yd pass from Baker Mayfield, Austin Seibert XP good (OU 14–7)
- OU – 09:00 Austin Seibert 40 yd field goal (OU 17–7)
- OU – 02:16 Joe Mixon 35 yd run, Austin Seibert XP good (OU 24–7)

Third Quarter

- WVU – 09:40 Jovon Durante 1 yd pass from Skyler Howard, Josh Lambert XP good (OU 24–14)
- WVU – 06:57 Josh Lambert 23 yd field goal (OU 24–17)
- OU – 02:34 Austin Seibert 25 yd field goal (OU 27–17)
- WVU – 00:58 Skyler Howard 50 yd run, Josh Lambert XP good (OU 27–24)
- OU – 00:13 Durron Neal 71 yd pass from Baker Mayfield, Austin Seibert XP good (OU 34–24)

Fourth Quarter

- OU – 09:37 Jordan Evans 41 yd fumble recovery, Austin Seibert XP good (OU 41–24)
- OU – 06:06 Austin Seibert 44 yd field goal (OU 44–24)

Top Passers

- WVU – Skyler Howard 17/32, 173 yards, 1 TD, 3 INT
- OU – Baker Mayfield 14/25, 320 yards, 3 TD, 1 INT

Top Rushers

- WVU – Wendell Smallwood 22 attempts, 111 yards
- OU – Samaje Perine 16 attempts, 65 yards

Top Receiving

- WVU – Jordan Thompson 3 receptions, 46 yards
- OU – Dede Westbrook 5 receptions, 107 yards

Top Tacklers

- WVU – Nick Kwiatkowski 11 tackles
- OU – Eric Striker 13 tackles

=== Texas ===
#10 Oklahoma Sooners vs. Texas Longhorns – Game summary

Quarter	1	2	3	4	Total
#10 Oklahoma	0	3	7	7	17
Texas	14	0	3	7	24

at Cotton Bowl • Dallas, TX

- Date: October 10, 2015
- Game time: 11:07 a.m. CDT
- Game weather: Temperature: 69 °F (21 °C) • Wind: • Weather:
- Game attendance: 91,546
- Referee: Referee: Cooper Castleberry • Umpire: Jim Adams • Linesman: Bill Scott • Line judge: Frank LeBlanc • Back judge: Joel Wetzel • Field judge: Randy Smith • Side judge: Jim Murphy • Scorer: Stacy Hardin
- TV announcers (ABC): Sean McDonough (Play-by-play), Chris Spielman (Color) & Todd McShay (Sideline)

Game information

First Quarter

- TEX – 07:52 Marcus Johnson 24 yd pass from Jerrod Heard, Nick Rose XP good (TEX 7–0)
- TEX – 05:37 Tyrone Swoopes 3 yd run, Nick Rose XP good (TEX 14–0)

Second Quarter

- OU – 06:05 Austin Seibert 21 yd field goal (TEX 14–3)

Third Quarter

- TEX – 08:18 Nick Rose 27 yd field goal (TEX 17–3)
- OU – 05:16 Dimitri Flowers 2 yd pass from Baker Mayfield, Austin Seibert XP good (TEX 17–10)

Fourth Quarter

- TEX – 13:52 Caleb Bluiett 24 yd pass from Tyrone Swoopes, Nick Rose XP good (TEX 24–10)
- OU – 08:00 Samaje Perine 1 yd run, Austin Seibert XP good (TEX 24–17)

Top Passers

- OU – Baker Mayfield 20/28, 211 yards, 1 TD
- TEX – Jerrod Heard 8/11, 53 yards, 1 TD

Top Rushers

- OU – Samaje Perine 10 attempts, 36 yards, 1 TD
- TEX – D'Onta Foreman 9 attempts, 117 yards

Top Receiving

- OU – Sterling Shepard 6 receptions, 95 yards
- TEX – Marcus Johnson 4 receptions, 35 yards, 1 TD

Top Tacklers

- OU – Jordan Evans 11 tackles
- TEX – Naashon Hughes 9 tackles

=== Kansas State ===
#19 Oklahoma Sooners at Kansas State Wildcats – Game summary

Quarter	1	2	3	4	Total
#19 Oklahoma	14	21	13	7	55
Kansas State	0	0	0	0	0

at Bill Snyder Family Football Stadium • Manhattan, KS

- Date: October 17, 2015
- Game time: 2:41 p.m. CDT
- Game weather: Temperature: 60 °F (16 °C) • Wind: SE 13 • Weather: Cloudy
- Game attendance: 52,867
- Referee: Referee: Dan Romeo • Umpire: Scott Teifer • Linesman: Andy Warner • Line judge: Marc Bovos • Back judge: Chris Alston • Field judge: Ed Vinzant • Side judge: Craig Faulkner • Scorer: Ken Ray
- TV announcers (ABC): Dave LaMont (Play-by-play), Ray Bentley (Color) & Dawn Davenport (Sideline)

Game information

First Quarter

- OU – 13:56 Sterling Shepard 22 yd pass from Baker Mayfield, Austin Seibert XP good (OU 7–0)
- OU – 08:33 Joe Mixon 10 yd pass from Baker Mayfield, Austin Seibert XP good (OU 14–0)

Second Quarter

- OU – 12:00 Sterling Shepard 28 yd pass from Baker Mayfield, Austin Seibert XP good (OU 21–0)
- OU – 07:29 Mark Andrews 3 yd pass from Baker Mayfield, Austin Seibert XP good (OU 28–0)
- OU – 04:59 Dede Westbrook 4 yd pass from Baker Mayfield, Austin Seibert XP good (OU 35–0)

Third Quarter

- OU – 14:38 Zack Sanchez 38 yd interception return, Austin Seibert XP good (OU 42–0)
- OU – 09:27 Austin Seibert 20 yd field goal (OU 45–0)
- OU – 03:28 Austin Seibert 19 yd field goal (OU 48–0)

Fourth Quarter

- OU – 09:44 Joe Mixon 1 yd run, Austin Seibert XP good (OU 55–0)

Top Passers

- OU – Baker Mayfield 20/27, 282 yards, 5 TD
- KSU – Joe Hubener 4/14, 39 yards, 2 INT

Top Rushers

- OU – Joe Mixon 15 attempts, 73 yards, 1 TD
- KSU – Kody Cook 11 attempts, 19 yards

Top Receiving

- OU – Dede Westbrook 5 receptions, 85 yards, 1 TD
- KSU – Kody Cook 2 receptions, 38 yards

Top Tacklers

- OU – Frank Shannon 4 tackles
- KSU – Sean Newlan 14 tackles

=== Texas Tech ===
Texas Tech Red Raiders at #17 Oklahoma Sooners – Game summary

Quarter	1	2	3	4	Total
Texas Tech	3	14	10	0	27
#17 Oklahoma	14	14	21	14	63

at Gaylord Family Oklahoma Memorial Stadium • Norman, OK

- Date: October 24, 2015
- Game time: 2:35 p.m. CDT
- Game weather: Temperature: 60 °F (16 °C) • Wind: NE 14 • Weather: Cloudy
- Game attendance: 85,312
- Referee: Referee: Mike Defee • Umpire: Robert Richeson • Linesman: Al Green • Line judge: Marc Bovos • Back judge: Terry Jones • Field judge: Joe Blubaugh • Side judge: Lo Van Pham • Center judge: Mike Cuttone
- TV announcers (ABC/ESPN2): Adam Amin (Play-by-play), Kelly Stouffer (Color) & Olivia Harlan (Sideline)

Game information

First Quarter

- OU – 08:18 Joe Mixon 11 yd run, Austin Seibert XP good (OU 7–0)
- OU – 06:39 Samaje Perine 3 yd run, Austin Seibert XP good (OU 14–0)
- TTU – 01:42 Clayton Hatfield 34 yd field goal (OU 14–3)

Second Quarter

- OU – 13:27 Joe Mixon 17 yd run, Austin Seibert XP good (OU 21–3)
- TTU – 09:32 Reginald Davis 6 yd pass from Patrick Mahomes, Clayton Hatfield XP good (OU 21–10)
- TTU – 07:05 DeAndre Washington 13 yd run, Clayton Hatfield XP good (OU 21–17)
- OU – 03:31 Samaje Perine 10 yd run, Austin Seibert XP good (OU 28–17)

Third Quarter

- OU – 14:14 Mark Andrews 13 yd pass from Baker Mayfield, Austin Seibert XP good (OU 35–17)
- TTU – 09:16 Clayton Hatfield 28 yd field goal (OU 35–20)
- OU – 07:04 Samaje Perine 6 yd run, Austin Seibert XP good (OU 42–20)
- TTU – 04:50 Patrick Mahomes 1 yd run, Clayton Hatfield XP good (OU 42–27)
- OU – 01:03 Durron Neal 15 yd pass from Baker Mayfield, Austin Seibert XP good (OU 49–27)

Fourth Quarter

- OU – 08:18 Samaje Perine 2 yd run, Austin Seibert XP good (OU 56–27)
- OU – 02:26 Alex Ross 9 yd run, Austin Seibert XP good (OU 63–27)

Top Passers

- TTU – Patrick Mahomes 26/40, 233 yards, 1 TD, 4 INT
- OU – Baker Mayfield 15/22, 212 yards, 2 TD, 1 INT

Top Rushers

- TTU – DeAndre Washington 19 attempts, 94 yards, 1 TD
- OU – Samaje Perine 23 attempts, 201 yards, 4 TD

Top Receiving

- TTU – Jakeem Grant 7 receptions, 55 yards
- OU – Dede Westbrook 3 receptions, 58 yards

Top Tacklers

- TTU – Dakota Allen 15 tackles
- OU – Frank Shannon 13 tackles

=== Kansas ===
#14 Oklahoma Sooners at Kansas Jayhawks – Game summary

Quarter	1	2	3	4	Total
#14 Oklahoma	21	17	17	7	62
Kansas	0	7	0	0	7

at Memorial Stadium • Lawrence, KS

- Date: October 31, 2015
- Game time: 2:35 p.m. CDT
- Game weather: Temperature: 57 °F (14 °C) • Wind: W 9 • Weather: Cloudy
- Game attendance: 26,677
- Referee: Referee: Brad Van Vark • Umpire: Michael Cooper • Linesman: George Gusman • Line judge: Jerod Phillips • Back judge: Brian Ernest • Field judge: Jason Ledet • Side judge: Gene Semko • Center judge: Brian Alos
- TV announcers (FS1): Joe Davis (Play-by-play), Brady Quinn (Color) & Kris Budden (Sideline)

Game information

First Quarter

- OU – 09:48 Joe Mixon 68 yd pass from Baker Mayfield, Austin Seibert XP good (OU 7–0)
- OU – 05:32 Durron Neal 11 yd pass from Baker Mayfield, Austin Seibert XP good (OU 14–0)
- OU – 01:51 Sterling Shepard 4 yd pass from Baker Mayfield, Austin Seibert XP good (OU 21–0)

Second Quarter

- KU – 14:54 Tyler Patrick 17 yd pass from Ryan Willis, Nick Bartolotta XP good (OU 21–7)
- OU – 09:00 Samaje Perine 3 yd run, Austin Seibert XP good (OU 28–7)
- OU – 02:34 Austin Seibert 46 yd field goal (OU 31–7)
- OU – 00:22 Samaje Perine 1 yd run, Austin Seibert XP good (OU 38–7)

Third Quarter

- OU – 09:46 Sam Grant 1 yd pass from Baker Mayfield, Austin Seibert XP good (OU 45–7)
- OU – 08:19 Trevor Knight 1 yd run, Austin Seibert XP good (OU 52–7)
- OU – 02:03 Nick Hodgson 32 yd field goal (OU 55–7)

Fourth Quarter

- OU – 05:32 Connor Knight 17 yd pass from Trevor Knight, Nick Hodgson XP good (OU 62–7)

Top Passers

- OU – Baker Mayfield 27/32, 383 yards, 4 TD
- KU – Ryan Willis 20/34, 181 yards, 1 TD

Top Rushers

- OU – Alex Ross 13 attempts, 103 yards
- KU – Taylor Cox 12 attempts, 30 yards

Top Receiving

- OU – Sterling Shepard 11 receptions, 183 yards, 1 TD
- KU – Tyler Patrick 5 receptions, 46 yards, 1 TD

Top Tacklers

- OU – Dominique Alexander 11 tackles
- KU – Fish Smithson 10 tackles

=== Iowa State ===
Iowa State Cyclones at Oklahoma Sooners – Game summary

Quarter	1	2	3	4	Total
Iowa State	3	6	0	7	16
#14 Oklahoma	21	0	17	14	52

at Gaylord Family Oklahoma Memorial Stadium • Norman, OK

- Date: November 7, 2015
- Game time: 6:02 p.m. CST
- Game weather: Temperature: 59 °F (15 °C) • Wind: NNE 12 • Weather: Clear
- Game attendance: 85,595
- Referee: Referee: Eddy Shelton • Umpire: Rick Podraza • Linesman: Rick Smith • Line judge: Kelly Detering • Back judge: Terry White • Field judge: Nick Lave • Side judge: Jim Murphy • Center judge: Steve Baron
- TV announcers (ESPNU): Roy Philpott (Play-by-play) & Jay Walker (Color)

Game information

First Quarter

- ISU – 10:46 Cole Netten 43 yd field goal (ISU 3–0)
- OU – 10:33 Dimitri Flowers 75 yd pass from Baker Mayfield, Austin Seibert XP good (OU 7–3)
- OU – 05:53 Dede Westbrook 27 yd pass from Baker Mayfield, Austin Seibert XP good (OU 14–3)
- OU – 03:33 Baker Mayfield 17 yd run, Austin Seibert XP good (OU 21–3)

Second Quarter

- ISU – 11:35 Cole Netten 45 yd field goal (OU 21–6)
- ISU – 01:14 Cole Netten 51 yd field goal (OU 21–9)

Third Quarter

- OU – 11:07 Austin Seibert 37 yd field goal (OU 24–9)
- OU – 07:03 Samaje Perine 8 yd run, Austin Seibert XP good (OU 31–9)
- OU – 01:05 Sterling Shepard 74 yd pass from Baker Mayfield, Austin Seibert XP good (OU 38–9)

Fourth Quarter

- OU – 11:19 Joe Mixon 57 yd run, Austin Seibert XP good (OU 45–9)
- OU – 08:51 Mark Andrews 55 yd pass from Trevor Knight, Austin Seibert XP good (OU 52–9)
- ISU – 05:08 D'Vario Montgomery 13 yd pass from Joel Lanning, Cole Netten XP good (OU 52–16)

Top Passers

- ISU – Joel Lanning 26/51, 260 yards, 1 TD, 1 INT
- OU – Baker Mayfield 23/31, 342 yards, 3 TD

Top Rushers

- ISU – Mike Warren 18 attempts, 43 yards
- OU – Samaje Perine 13 attempts, 95 yards, 1 TD

Top Receiving

- ISU – Allen Lazard 8 receptions, 101 yards
- OU – Sterling Shepard 4 receptions, 94 yards, 1 TD

Top Tacklers

- ISU – Brian Peavy 9 tackles
- OU – Ahmad Thomas 10 tackles

=== Baylor ===
Oklahoma Sooners at Baylor Bears – Game summary

Quarter	1	2	3	4	Total
#12 Oklahoma	7	13	14	10	44
#4 Baylor	6	7	14	7	34

at McLane Stadium • Waco, TX

- Date: November 14, 2015
- Game time: 7:14 p.m. CST
- Game weather: Temperature: 55 °F (13 °C) • Wind: NNE 5 • Weather: Light rain
- Game attendance: 49,875
- Referee: Referee: Reggie Smith • Umpire: Scott Teifer • Linesman: Mike Moeller • Line judge: Mark Stewart • Back judge: Lyndon Nixon • Field judge: Matt Mills • Side judge: Tim Murray • Scorer: Dan Scanlan
- TV announcers (ABC): Chris Fowler (Play-by-play), Kirk Herbstreit (Color) & Heather Cox (Sideline)

Game information

First Quarter

- BAY – 10:26 Devin Chafin 5 yd run, Cole Edminston rush no good (BAY 6–0)
- OU – 06:38 Samaje Perine 6 yd run, Austin Seibert XP good (OU 7–6)

Second Quarter

- OU – 08:53 Sterling Shepard 39 yd pass from Baker Mayfield, Austin Seibert XP no good (OU 13–6)
- BAY – 02:58 Devin Chafin 3 yd run, Chris Callahan XP good (Tied 13–13)
- OU – 00:28 Baker Mayfield 2 yd run, Austin Seibert XP good (OU 20–13)

Third Quarter

- BAY – 12:28 Devin Chafin 6 yd run, Chris Callahan XP good (Tied 20–20)
- OU – 09:52 Sterling Shepard 7 yd pass from Baker Mayfield, Austin Seibert XP good (OU 27–20)
- OU – 08:53 Samaje Perine 55 yd run, Austin Seibert XP good (OU 34–20)
- BAY – 02:49 LaQuan McGowan 5 yd pass from Jarrett Stidham, Chris Callahan XP good (OU 34–27)

Fourth Quarter

- OU – 14:47 Austin Seibert 33 yd field goal (OU 37–27)
- BAY – 10:29 Jay Lee 17 yd pass from Jarrett Stidham, Chris Callahan XP good (OU 37–34)
- OU – 04:47 Dimitri Flowers 7 yd pass from Baker Mayfield, Austin Seibert XP good (OU 44–34)

Top Passers

- OU – Baker Mayfield 24/34, 270 yards, 3 TD, 1 INT
- BAY – Jarrett Stidham 16/27, 257 yards, 2 TD, 2 INT

Top Rushers

- OU – Samaje Perine 28 attempts, 166 yards, 2 TD
- BAY – Shock Linwood 21 attempts, 103 yards

Top Receiving

- OU – Sterling Sheparrd 14 receptions, 177 yards, 2 TD
- BAY – K. D. Cannon 5 receptions, 77 yards

Top Tacklers

- OU – Jordan Evans 9 tackles
- BAY – Travon Blanchard 15 tackles

=== TCU ===
TCU Horned Frogs vs Oklahoma Sooners – Game summary

Quarter	1	2	3	4	Total
#11 TCU	7	0	6	16	29
#7 Oklahoma	7	16	7	0	30

at Gaylord Family Oklahoma Memorial Stadium • Norman, OK

- Date: November 21, 2015
- Game time: 7:14 p.m. CST
- Game weather: Temperature: 36 °F (2 °C) • Wind: N 8 • Weather: Clear
- Game attendance: 85,821
- Referee: Referee: Alan Eck • Umpire: Tab Slaughter • Linesman: Cal McNeill • Line judge: Kelly Deterding • Back judge: Donnie Aultman • Field judge: Scott Gaines • Side judge: Anthony Fleming • Center judge: Chris Tallent
- TV announcers (ABC): Brad Nessler (Play-by-play) Todd Blackledge (Color) & Holly Rowe (Sideline)

Game information

First Quarter

- TCU – 09:34 Kolby Listenbee 37 yd pass from Foster Sawyer, Jaden Oberkrom XP good (TCU 7–0)
- OU – 00:22 Sterling Shepard 21 yd pass from Baker Mayfield, Austin Seibert XP good (Tied 7–7)

Second Quarter

- OU – 11:16 Austin Seibert 35 yd field goal (OU 10–7)
- OU – 06:12 Austin Seibert 32 yd field goal (OU 13–7)
- OU – 05:06 Dede Westbrook 36 yd pass from Baker Mayfield, Austin Seibert XP good (OU 20–7)
- OU – 00:00 Austin Seibert 37 yd field goal (OU 23–7)

Third Quarter

- TCU – 12:43 Aaron Green 26 yd run, Foster Sawyer pass failed (OU 23–13)
- OU – 07:55 Samaje Perine 72 yd run, Austin Seibert XP good (OU 30–13)

Fourth Quarter

- TCU – 08:59 KaVonte Turpin 86 yd pass from Bram Kohlhausen, Jaden Oberkrom XP good (OU 30–20)
- TCU – 06:27 Jaden Oberkrom 43 yd field goal (OU 30–23)
- TCU – 00:51 Emanuel Porter 14 yd pass from Bram Kohlhausen, Bram Kohlhausen pass failed (OU 30–29)

Top Passers

- TCU – Bram Kohlhausen 5/11, 122 yards, 2 TD
- OU – Baker Mayfield 9/20, 127 yards, 2 TD

Top Rushers

- TCU – Aaron Green 24 attempts, 127 yards, 1 TD
- OU – Samaje Perine 26 attempts, 188 yards, 1 TD

Top Receiving

- TCU – Kolby Listenbee 4 receptions, 98 yards, 1 TD
- OU – Sterling Sheparrd 8 receptions, 111 yards, 1 TD

Top Tacklers

- TCU – Derrick Kindred 9 tackles
- OU – Eric Striker 9 tackles

=== Oklahoma State (Bedlam Series) ===
Oklahoma Sooners vs Oklahoma State Cowboys – Game summary

Quarter	1	2	3	4	Total
#5 Oklahoma	14	30	7	7	58
#9 Oklahoma State	10	10	3	0	23

at Boone Pickens Stadium • Stillwater, OK

- Date: November 28, 2015
- Game time: 7:21 p.m. CST
- Game weather: Temperature: 34 °F (1 °C) • Wind: NNW 6 • Weather: Cloudy
- Game attendance: 58,231
- Referee: Referee: Brad Van Vark • Umpire: Michael Cooper • Linesman: George Gusman • Line judge: Jerod Phillips • Back judge: Brian Ernest • Field judge: Jason Ledet • Side judge: Tim Murray • Center judge: Brian Alos
- TV announcers (ABC): Chris Fowler (Play-by-play), Kirk Herbstreit (Color), Heather Cox (Sideline) & Tom Rinaldi (Sideline)

Game information

First Quarter

- OSU – 06:49 Ben Grogan 43 yd field goal (OSU 3–0)
- OU – 06:33 Sterling Shepard 4 yd pass from Baker Mayfield, Austin Seibert XP good (OU 7–3)
- OSU – 04:36 Jhajuan Seales 26 yd pass from J. W. Walsh, Ben Grogan XP good (OSU 10–7)
- OU – 02:04 Samaje Perine 68 yd run, Austin Seibert XP good (OU 14–10)

Second Quarter

- OU – 13:49 Joe Mixon 66 yd run, Austin Seibert XP good (OU 21–10)
- OU – 07:25 Dimitri Flowers 5 yd pass from Baker Mayfield, Austin Seibert XP good (OU 28–10)
- OU – 06:59 Jordan Thomas 32 yd interception return, Austin Seibert XP blocked (OU 34–10)
- OSU – 06:41 James Washington 72 yd pass from J. W. Walsh, Ben Grogan XP good (OU 34–17)
- OU – 04:14 Samaje Perine 23 yd run, Austin Seibert XP good (OU 41–17)
- OU – 01:14 Austin Seibert 40 yd field goal (OU 44–17)
- OSU – 00:00 Ben Grogan 36 yd field goal (OU 44–20)

Third Quarter

- OSU – 08:46 Ben Grogan 21 yd field goal (OU 44–23)
- OU – 04:42 Baker Mayfield 5 yd run, Austin Seibert XP good (OU 51–23)

Fourth Quarter

- OU – 02:15 Joe Mixon 6 yd run, Austin Seibert XP good (OU 58–23)

Top Passers

- OU – Baker Mayfield 17/25, 180 yards, 2 TD
- OSU – J. W. Walsh 25/42, 325 yards, 2 TD, 1 INT

Top Rushers

- OU – Joe Mixon 14 attempts, 136 yards, 2 TD
- OSU – J. W. Walsh 12 attempts, 50 yards

Top Receiving

- OU – Sterling Sheparrd 10 receptions, 87 yards, 1 TD
- OSU – James Washington 7 receptions, 169 yards, 1 TD

Top Tacklers

- OU – Jordan Evans 9 tackles
- OSU – Chad Whitener 10 tackles

=== Clemson (Orange Bowl) ===
Oklahoma Sooners vs Clemson Tigers – Game summary

Quarter	1	2	3	4	Total
#4 Oklahoma	7	10	0	0	17
#1 Clemson	3	13	14	7	37

at Sun Life Stadium • Miami Gardens, FL

- Date: December 31, 2015
- Game time: 3:10 p.m. CST
- Game attendance: 67,615
- TV announcers (ESPN): Brad Nessler (Play-by-Play) Todd Blackledge (Analyst) Holly Rowe (Sideline)

== Weekly awards ==
- Big 12 Player of the Week

Baker Mayfield (Week 3 vs Tulsa)
Baker Mayfield (Week 10 at Baylor)

- Big 12 Offensive Player of the Week

Samaje Perine (Week 8 vs Texas Tech)

- Big 12 Defensive Player of the Week

Zack Sanchez (Week 2 at Tennessee)
Eric Striker (Week 5 vs West Virginia)
Zack Sanchez (Week 7 vs Kansas State)
Charles Tapper (Week 8 at Kansas)
Zack Sanchez (Week 11 vs TCU)

- Big 12 Special Teams Player of the Week

Austin Seibert (Week 5 vs West Virginia)

== Postseason ==
=== Awards ===
- Ty Darlington

Academic All-America (first team)

- Baker Mayfield

Burlsworth Trophy

=== 2016 NFL draft ===
The 2016 NFL draft was held at the Auditorium Theatre and Grant Park in Chicago on April 28–30, 2016. The following Oklahoma players were either selected or signed as free agents following the draft.

Player	Position	Round	Overall pick	NFL team
Sterling Shepard	WR	2nd	40	New York Giants
Charles Tapper	DE	4th	101	Dallas Cowboys
Zack Sanchez	CB	5th	141	Carolina Panthers
Devante Bond	OLB	6th	183	Tampa Bay Buccaneers
Dominique Alexander	LB	Undrafted		Cleveland Browns
Ty Darlington	C	Undrafted		Tennessee Titans
Nila Kasitati	OG	Undrafted		Washington Redskins
Durron Neal	WR	Undrafted		Denver Broncos
Frank Shannon	LB	Undrafted		Denver Broncos
Eric Striker	LB	Undrafted		Buffalo Bills

== Rankings ==
Ranking movements Legend: ██ Increase in ranking ██ Decrease in ranking ( ) = First-place votes
	Week															
Poll	Pre	1	2	3	4	5	6	7	8	9	10	11	12	13	14	Final
AP	19	19	16	15	15	10	19	17	14	14	12	7	5	3	4	5
Coaches	19	17	17	14	14	9	19	15	13	13	11	7	5	4 (2)	3	5
CFP	Not released									15	12	7	3	3	4	Not released
