= 2015 Kansas State Wildcats football team =

American college football season

2015 Kansas State Wildcats football

Liberty Bowl, L 23–45 vs. Arkansas
- Conference: Big 12 conference
- Record: 6–7 (3–6 Big 12)
- Head coach: Bill Snyder (24th season)
- Co-offensive coordinators: Dana Dimel (9th season); Del Miller (16th season)
- Offensive scheme: Multiple
- Defensive coordinator: Tom Hayes (4th season)
- Base defense: 4–3
- Home stadium: Bill Snyder Family Football Stadium

2015 Big 12 Conference football standings
	Conf.			Overall
Team	W		L	W		L
No. 5 Oklahoma $^	8	–	1	11	–	2
No. 20 Oklahoma State	7	–	2	10	–	3
No. 7 TCU	7	–	2	11	–	2
No. 13 Baylor	6	–	3	10	–	3
West Virginia	4	–	5	8	–	5
Texas Tech	4	–	5	7	–	6
Texas	4	–	5	5	–	7
Kansas State	3	–	6	6	–	7
Iowa State	2	–	7	3	–	9
Kansas	0	–	9	0	–	12
^ – College Football Playoff participant; $ – Conference champion; Rankings from AP Poll

The 2015 Kansas State Wildcats football team represented Kansas State University in the 2015 NCAA Division I FBS football season. The Wildcats played their home games at Bill Snyder Family Football Stadium, in Manhattan, Kansas as they have done since 1968. The Wildcats were led by head coach Bill Snyder in his 24th overall and seventh straight season since taking over for his second tenure in 2009. 2015 was the 120th season in school history. K-State was a member of the Big 12 Conference. They finished the season 6–7, 3–6 in Big 12 play to finish in eighth place. They were invited to the Liberty Bowl where they lost to Arkansas.

== Previous season ==
The 2014 Kansas State Wildcats football team finished the regular season 9-3, with losses to Auburn of the SEC, Baylor and TCU. The Wildcats had been ranked in all polls with the highest ranked in the new College Football Playoff rankings at number 7. Kansas State became bowl eligible after winning its sixth game against Texas on October 25 and was invited to play in the 2015 Alamo Bowl against UCLA. Kansas State fell short to the Bruins in San Antonio, Texas with a loss of 35–40.

== Schedule ==
Kansas State announced their 2015 football schedule on November 19, 2014. The 2015 schedule consists of seven home games and five away games in the regular season. The Wildcats will host Big 12 foes Baylor, Iowa State, Oklahoma, TCU, and West Virginia and will travel to Kansas, Oklahoma State, Texas, and Texas Tech.

The Wildcats hosted two non conference games against South Dakota and Louisiana Tech and traveled to its other non conference foe UTSA in San Antonio, TX.

On December 6, 2015, Kansas State accepted an invitation to play in the 2016 AutoZone Liberty Bowl on January 2 in Memphis, Tennessee.

Date	Time	Opponent	Site	TV	Result	Attendance
September 5	6:00 p.m.	South Dakota*	Bill Snyder Family Football Stadium; Manhattan, KS	K-StateHD.TV	W 34–0	53,297
September 12	11:00 a.m.	at UTSA*	Alamodome; San Antonio, TX	FS1	W 30–3	29,424
September 19	2:00 p.m.	Louisiana Tech*	Bill Snyder Family Football Stadium; Manhattan, KS	FSN	W 39–33 ^{3OT}	53,540
October 3	3:00 p.m.	at No. 20 Oklahoma State	Boone Pickens Stadium; Stillwater, OK	FS1	L 34–36	57,618
October 10	6:30 p.m.	No. 2 TCU	Bill Snyder Family Football Stadium; Manhattan, KS	FOX	L 45–52	53,671
October 17	2:30 p.m.	No. 19 Oklahoma^{†}	Bill Snyder Family Football Stadium; Manhattan, KS	ABC	L 0–55	52,867
October 24	11:00 a.m.	at Texas	Darrell K Royal–Texas Memorial Stadium; Austin, TX	FS1	L 9–23	88,283
November 5	6:30 p.m.	No. 2 Baylor	Bill Snyder Family Football Stadium; Manhattan, KS	FS1	L 24–31	52,108
November 14	2:30 p.m.	at Texas Tech	Jones AT&T Stadium; Lubbock, TX	FS1	L 44–59	53,833
November 21	11:00 a.m.	Iowa State	Bill Snyder Family Football Stadium; Manhattan, KS (rivalry)	FS1	W 38–35	53,297
November 28	3:00 p.m.	at Kansas	Memorial Stadium; Lawrence, KS (rivalry)	FS1	W 45–14	23,842
December 5	3:30 p.m.	West Virginia	Bill Snyder Family Football Stadium; Manhattan, KS	FS1	W 24–23	52,918
January 2, 2016	2:20 p.m.	vs. Arkansas*	Liberty Bowl Memorial Stadium; Memphis, TN (Liberty Bowl)	ESPN	L 23–45	61,136
*Non-conference game; ^{†}Homecoming; Rankings from AP Poll released prior to the game; All times are in Central time

== Game summaries ==
=== At UTSA ===
	1	2	3	4	Total
Wildcats	0	7	6	17	30
Roadrunners	3	0	0	0	3

=== Louisiana Tech ===
	1	2	3	4	OT	Total
Bulldogs	0	10	3	10	10	33
Wildcats	3	3	7	10	16	39

=== At Oklahoma State ===
	1	2	3	4	Total
Wildcats	14	14	0	6	34
Cowboys	7	13	6	10	36

Kansas State traveled to Stillwater, Oklahoma to take on the 25th-ranked Cowboys on October 3, 2015. Late in the second quarter, an officiating error gave Oklahoma State a first down when the offense was four yards short of the line to gain after the third down play. The series ended with a touchdown for Oklahoma State.

The error brought into question Big 12 Conference officiating, especially in light that the game was on the 25th anniversary of the Fifth Down Game between the Colorado Buffaloes and Missouri Tigers. SB Nation published "K-State lost to Oklahoma State, 36-34. Inept Big 12 officials gifted Oklahoma State a touchdown." The Big 12 Conference later acknowledged the error and that disciplinary actions will be addressed with both the field officials and chain crew.

Oklahoma State won the game on a last-minute field goal.

=== TCU ===
All-time record	Big 12 record	Last meeting	Result
5–4	2–2	2014	TCU, 41–20

TCU Horned Frogs at Kansas State Wildcats – Game Summary

Quarter	1	2	3	4	Total
#2 Horned Frogs	14	3	14	21	52
Wildcats	7	28	0	10	45

at Bill Snyder Family Football Stadium • Manhattan, KS

- Date: October 10, 2015
- Game time: 6:30 p.m. CT (actual: 6:35 p.m. – 10:12 p.m.)
- Game weather: Clear, 76 °F (24 °C), wind S 14 mph (23 km/h)
- Game attendance: 53,671
- Referee: Reggie Smith, Umpire: Joel Bellinger, Linesman: Mike Moeller, Line judge: Mark Stewart, Back judge: Lyndon Nixon, Field judge: Matt Mills, Side judge: Tim Murray, Center judge: Dan Scanlan
- TV announcers (FOX): Gus Johnson (play-by-play), Joel Klatt (color), Molly McGrath (sideline)
- Sources: TCU Game Notes, GoFrogs.com

Game information

First Quarter

- 14:42 – TCU – Aaron Green 86-yd run (Jaden Oberkrom, kick), TCU 7 – K-State 0
- 09:39 – K-State – Joe Hubener 2-yd run (Jack Cantele, kick), TCU 7 – K-State 7
- 07:46 – TCU – Josh Doctson 32-yd pass from Trevone Boykin (Jaden Oberkrom, kick), TCU 14 – K-State 7

Second Quarter

- 12:51 – K-State – Joe Hubener 17-yd run (Jack Cantele, kick), TCU 14 – K-State 14
- 11:32 – TCU – Jaden Oberkrom 50-yd field goal, TCU 17 – K-State 14
- 06:56 – K-State – Charles Jones 28-yd run (Jack Cantele, kick), TCU 17 – K-State 21
- 04:56 – K-State – Charles Jones 7-yd run (Jack Cantele, kick), TCU 17 – K-State 28
- 00:22 – K-State – Joe Hubener 1-yd run (Jack Cantele, kick), TCU 17 – K-State 35

Third Quarter

- 13:16 – TCU – Derrick Kindred 60-yd interception return (Jaden Oberkom, kick), TCU 24 – K-State 35
- 07:14 – TCU – Aaron Green 8-yd run (Jaden Oberkrom, kick), TCU 31 – K-State 35

Fourth Quarter

- 12:21 – K-State – Joe Hubener 1-yd run (Jack Cantele, kick), TCU 31 – K-State 42
- 07:55 – TCU – Trevone Boykin 14-yd run (Trevone Boykin pass failed), TCU 37 – K-State 42
- 06:07 – TCU – Trevone Boykin 69-yd run (Josh Doctson pass from Trevone Boykin), TCU 45 – K-State 42
- 01:47 – K-State – Jack Cantele 37-yd field goal, TCU 45 – K-State 45
- 01:10 – TCU – Josh Doctson 55-yd pass from Trevone Boykin (Jaden Oberkrom, kick), TCU 52 – K-State 45

Top Passers

- TCU – Trevone Boykin: 20–30, 2 INT, 301 yards, 2 TD
- K-State – Joe Hubener: 13–33, 1 INT, 157 yards, 0 TD

Top Rushers

- TCU – Trevone Boykin: 11 rushes, 124 yards (11.3), 2 TD
- K-State – Joe Hubener: 26 rushes, 111 yards (4.3), 4 TD

Top Receiving

- TCU – Josh Doctson: 8 receptions, 155 yards, 2 TD
- K-State – Deante Burton: 5 receptions, 65 yards, 0 TD

As the winner of the 2015 TCU–Kansas State football game, TCU took the lead in the all-time series against the Wildcats, with an overall record of 5–4. The Horned Frogs' come-from-behind win marked Gary Patterson's first win as a head coach against his alma mater in Manhattan. Jaden Oberkrom tied the all-time TCU career field goal record with a 50-yd field goal in the first half. The win marked the Frogs' 14th in a row, tying the all-time TCU record for consecutive wins. TCU's 52 points notched a school-record 5-game-50+ point streak. With the win, the Horned Frogs are now 25–1 when ranked in the top 5 and 36–3 when ranked in the top 10 under coach Patterson.

=== Oklahoma ===
#19 Oklahoma Sooners at Kansas State Wildcats – Game summary

Quarter	1	2	3	4	Total
#19 Oklahoma	14	21	13	7	55
Kansas State	0	0	0	0	0

at Bill Snyder Family Football Stadium • Manhattan, KS

- Date: October 17, 2015
- Game time: 2:41 p.m. CDT
- Game weather: Temperature: 60 °F (16 °C) • Wind SE 13 mph (21 km/h) • Weather: Cloudy
- Game attendance: 52,867
- Referee: Referee: Dan Romeo • Umpire: Scott Teifer • Linesman: Andy Warner • Line judge: Marc Bovos • Back judge: Chris Alston • Field judge: Ed Vinzant • Side judge: Craig Faulkner • Scorer: Ken Ray
- TV announcers (ABC): Dave LaMont (Play-by-play), Ray Bentley (Color) & Dawn Davenport (Sideline)

Game information

First Quarter

- OU – 13:56 Sterling Shepard 22 yd pass from Baker Mayfield, Austin Seibert XP good (OU 7–0)
- OU – 08:33 Joe Mixon 10 yd pass from Baker Mayfield, Austin Seibert XP good (OU 14–0)

Second Quarter

- OU – 12:00 Sterling Shepard 28 yd pass from Baker Mayfield, Austin Seibert XP good (OU 21–0)
- OU – 07:29 Mark Andrews 3 yd pass from Baker Mayfield, Austin Seibert XP good (OU 28–0)
- OU – 04:59 Dede Westbrook 4 yd pass from Baker Mayfield, Austin Seibert XP good (OU 35–0)

Third Quarter

- OU – 14:38 Zack Sanchez 38 yd interception return, Austin Seibert XP good (OU 42–0)
- OU – 09:27 Austin Seibert 20 yd field goal (OU 45–0)
- OU – 03:28 Austin Seibert 19 yd field goal (OU 48–0)

Fourth Quarter

- OU – 09:44 Joe Mixon 1 yd run, Austin Seibert XP good (OU 55–0)

Top Passers

- OU – Baker Mayfield 20/27, 282 yards, 5 TD
- KSU – Joe Hubener 4/14, 39 yards, 2 INT

Top Rushers

- OU – Joe Mixon 15 attempts, 73 yards, 1 TD
- KSU – Kody Cook 11 attempts, 19 yards

Top Receiving

- OU – Dede Westbrook 5 receptions, 85 yards, 1 TD
- KSU – Kody Cook 2 receptions, 38 yards

Top Tacklers

- OU – Frank Shannon 4 tackles
- KSU – Sean Newlan 14 tackles

This game was notable for being the first time Kansas State was shut out since 1996 at Colorado (L 0-12)

=== At Texas ===
	1	2	3	4	Total
Wildcats	0	6	3	0	9
Longhorns	3	13	0	7	23

=== Baylor ===
	1	2	3	4	Total
Bears	14	7	7	3	31
Wildcats	7	0	3	14	24

=== At Texas Tech ===
Week Eleven: Kansas State Wildcats at Texas Tech Red Raiders – Game summary

Quarter	1	2	3	4	Total
Wildcats	7	14	7	16	44
Red Raiders	28	7	10	14	59

at Jones AT&T Stadium Lubbock, TX

- Date: November 14
- Game time: 2:30 CT
- Game attendance: 53,833
- TV: FS1

Game information

First quarter

- TTU 12:08 – Justin Stockton 17 yard pass from Patrick Mahomes (Clayton Hatfield kick) TTU 7–0
- KSU 11:56 – Morgan Burns 93 yard kickoff return (Jack Cantele kick) tied 7–7
- TTU 10:15 – DeAndré Washington 5 yard run (Clayton Hatfield kick) TTU 14–7
- TTU 7:51 – DeAndré Washington 80 yard run (Clayton Hatfield kick) TTU 21–7
- TTU 4:47 – Justin Stockton 7 yard run (Clayton Hatfield kick) TTU 28–7

Second quarter

- KSU 6:02 – Joe Hubener 1 yard run (Jack Cantele kick) TTU 28–14
- TTU 3:43 – Devin Lauderdale 19 yard pass from Patrick Mahomes (Clayton Hatfield kick) TTU 35–14
- KSU 2:05 – Joe Hubener 1 yard run (Jack Cantele kick) TTU 35–21

Third quarter

- KSU 10:00 – Joe Hubener 1 yard run (Jack Cantele kick) TTU 35–28
- TTU 7:37 – Justin Stockton 20 yard pass from Patrick Mahomes (Clayton Hatfield kick) TTU 42–28
- TTU 5:14 – Clayton Hatfield 48 yard field goal TTU 45–28

Fourth quarter

- TTU 11:30 – Patrick Mahomes 4 yard run (Clayton Hatfield kick) TTU 52–28
- KSU 7:25 – Dominique Heath 6 yard pass from Joe Hubener TTU 52–34
- KSU 5:04 – Kyle Klein 33 yard pass from Joe Hubener (Jack Cantele kick) TTU 52–41
- KSU 3:38 – Jack Cantele 43 yard field goal TTU 52–44
- TTU 1:02 – DeAndré Washington 12 yard run (Clayton Hatfield kick) TTU 59–44

Leading Passers

- KSU – Joe Hubener 19/41, 289 yards, 2 TDs, 1 INT
- TTU – Patrick Mahomes 33/42, 384 yards, 3 TDs

Leading Rushers

- KSU – Joe Hubener 14 carries, 9 yards, 3 TDs
- TTU – DeAndré Washington 27 carries, 248 yards, 3 TDs

Leading Receivers

- KSU – Kyle Klein 6 receptions, 131 yards, 1 TD
- TTU – Devin Lauderdale 10 receptions, 94 yards, 1 TD

With the win, the Red Raiders broke a two-game losing streak against the Wildcats and became bowl eligible for the first time since the 2013 season. In the third quarter, kicker Clayton Hatfield made a season long 48 yard field goal.

=== Iowa State ===
Game Eleven: Iowa State Cyclones – Game summary

Quarter	1	2	3	4	Total
Cyclones	7	28	0	0	35
Wildcats	7	7	7	17	38

at Bill Snyder Family Football Stadium, Manhattan, KS

- Date: November 21
- Game time: 11:05 a.m. CST
- Game weather: Temperature: 36 °F (2 °C) • Wind N 11–15 mph (18–24 km/h) • Weather: Mostly sunny
- Game attendance: 53,297
- Referee: Referee: Brad Van Vark • Umpire: Michael Cooper • Linesman: George Gusman • Line judge: Jerod Phillips • Back judge: Brian Ernest • Field judge: Jason Ledet • Side judge: Gene Semko • Center judge: Brian Alos
- TV announcers (FS1): Justin Kutcher (Play-by-play) & Steve Hutchinson (Color)

Game information

First quarter

- ISU – 09:36 Trever Ryen 21 yd pass from Joel Lanning, Cole Netten XP good (ISU 7–0)
- KSU – 04:50 Winston Dimel 4 yd pass from Glenn Gronkowski, Jack Cantele XP good (Tied 7–7)

Second quarter

- ISU – 12:21 Joel Lanning 1 yd run, Cole Netten XP good (ISU 14–7)
- ISU – 08:11 Allen Lazard 30 yd pass from Joel Lanning, Cole Netten XP good (ISU 21–7)
- KSU – 07:59 Morgan Burns 100 yd kickoff return, Jack Cantle XP good (ISU 21–14)
- ISU – 07:34 Mike Warren 76 yd run, Cole Netten XP good (ISU 28–14)
- ISU – 00:29 Allen Lazard 16 yd pass from Joel Lanning, Cole Netten XP good (ISU 35–14)

Third quarter

- KSU – 08:49 Charles Jones 8 yd run, Jack Cantele XP good (ISU 35–21)

Fourth quarter

- KSU – 13:13 Kody Cook 7 yd pass from Joe Hubener, Jack Cantele XP good (ISU 35–28)
- KSU – 00:42 Charles Jones 5 yd run, Jack Cantele XP good (Tied 35–35)
- KSU – 00:03 Jack Cantele 42 yd field goal good (KSU 38–35)

Top passers

- ISU – Joel Lanning 15/20, 210 yards, 3 TD
- KSU – Joe Hubener 18/31, 216 yards, 1 TD

Top rushers

- ISU – Mike Warren 22 attempts, 195 yards, 1 TD
- KSU – Joe Hubener 20 attempts, 90 yards

Top receivers

- ISU – Allen Lazard 5 receptions, 87 yards, 2 TD
- KSU – Kody Cook 5 receptions, 68 yards, 1 TD

Top tacklers

- ISU – Brian Mills 8 tackles
- KSU – Kendall Adams 12 tackles

=== At Kansas ===
	1	2	3	4	Total
Wildcats	28	7	3	7	45
Jayhawks	7	0	0	7	14

=== West Virginia ===
	1	2	3	4	Total
Mountaineers	3	10	7	3	23
Wildcats	0	3	14	7	24

=== Vs. Arkansas ===
After finishing their season 6–6, the Wildcats accepted their invitation to play in the game.

This was the Wildcats' first Liberty Bowl. They would later play Navy in the 2019 Liberty Bowl where they would again suffer defeat.

Scoring summary

Quarter	Time	Drive			Team	Scoring information	Score	
Quarter	Time	Plays	Yards	TOP	Team	Scoring information	K-ST	ARK
1	11:38	4	27	1:52	K-ST	Winston Dimel 10-yard touchdown run, Matthew McCrane kick good	7	0
1	8:15	6	72	3:23	ARK	Alex Collins 22-yard touchdown run, Cole Hedlund kick good	7	7
1	3:50	8	46	4:18	K-ST	36-yard field goal by Matthew McCrane	10	7
1	2:22	3	24	1:17	ARK	Jared Cornelius 13-yard touchdown run, Cole Hedlund kick good	10	14
2	13:05	8	64	3:04	ARK	Alex Collins 13-yard touchdown run, Cole Hedlund kick good	10	21
2	2:08	9	55	4:59	ARK	26-yard field goal by Cole Hedlund	10	24
2	0:21	8	49	1:41	K-ST	21-yard field goal by Matthew McCrane	13	24
3	12:44	4	74	2:10	K-ST	Winston Dimel 48-yard touchdown reception from Kody Cook, Matthew McCrane kick good	20	24
3	7:54	9	82	4:42	ARK	Jeremy Sprinkel 6-yard touchdown reception from Brandon Allen, Cole Hedlund kick good	20	31
3	1:46	11	47	6:02	K-ST	32-yard field goal by Matthew McCrane	23	31
4	12:04	8	78	4:34	ARK	Alex Collins 14-yard touchdown run, Cole Hedlund kick good	23	38
4	4:46	9	80	5:38	ARK	Kody Walker 10-yard touchdown run, Cole Hedlund kick good	23	45
"TOP" = time of possession. For other American football terms, see Glossary of American football.							23	45

Statistics	K-ST	ARK
First downs	13	30
Total offense, plays - yards	47–242	68–569
Rushes-yards (net)	22–79	42–254
Passing yards (net)	163	315
Passes, Comp-Att-Int	12–25–1	20–26–1
Time of Possession	22:30	37:30

Arkansas running back Alex Collins was named the game's MVP, after gaining 185 yards and 3 touchdowns on 23 carries.
