= Jonathan Zamora =

Canadian gridiron football player (born 1996)

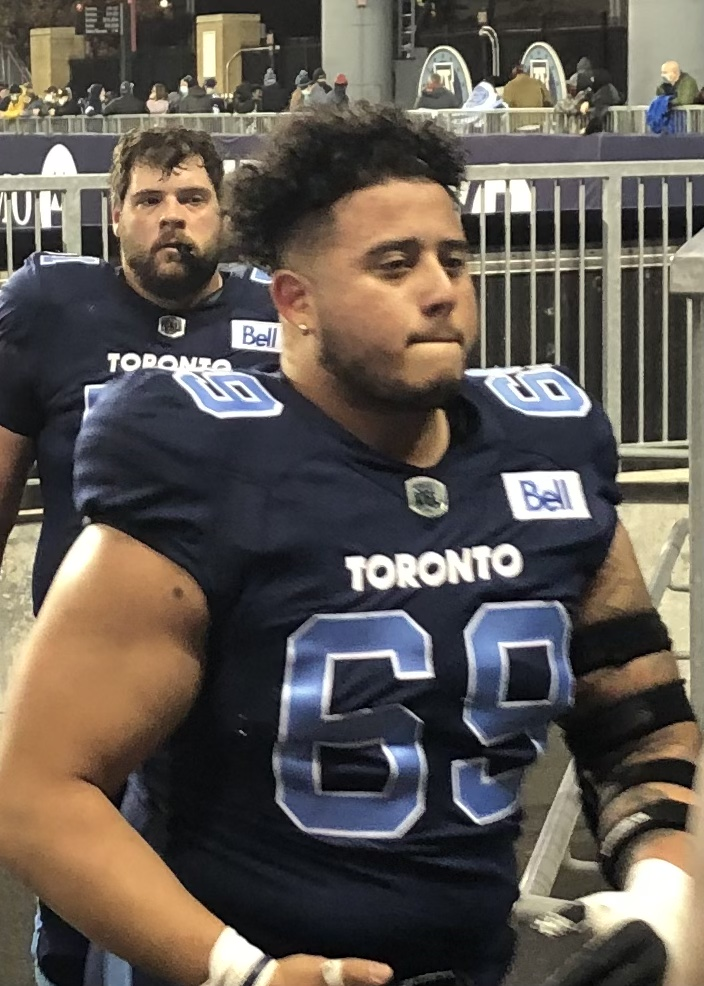
- Zamora with the Toronto Argonauts in 2021

No. 59
- Position: Offensive lineman

Personal information
- Born: October 31, 1996 (age 30); Toronto, Ontario, Canada
- Listed height: 6 ft 3 in (1.91 m)
- Listed weight: 312 lb (142 kg)

Career information
- High school: Canada Prep Academy
- University: St. Francis Xavier
- CFL draft: 2020: 3rd round, 26th overall pick

Career history
- 2021: Calgary Stampeders*
- 2021–2022: Toronto Argonauts
- 2022: Calgary Stampeders
- * Offseason or practice squad member only

Awards and highlights
- Loney Bowl champion (2018); Second-team U Sports All-Canadian (2018)
- Stats at CFL.ca

Jonathan Zamora (born October 31, 1996) is a Canadian former professional football offensive lineman.

== University career ==
Zamora played U Sports football for the St. Francis Xavier X-Men from 2016 to 2019 where he played in 31 games over four seasons. In 2018, he was named a U Sports Second Team All-Canadian and was also a Loney Bowl champion.

== Professional career ==
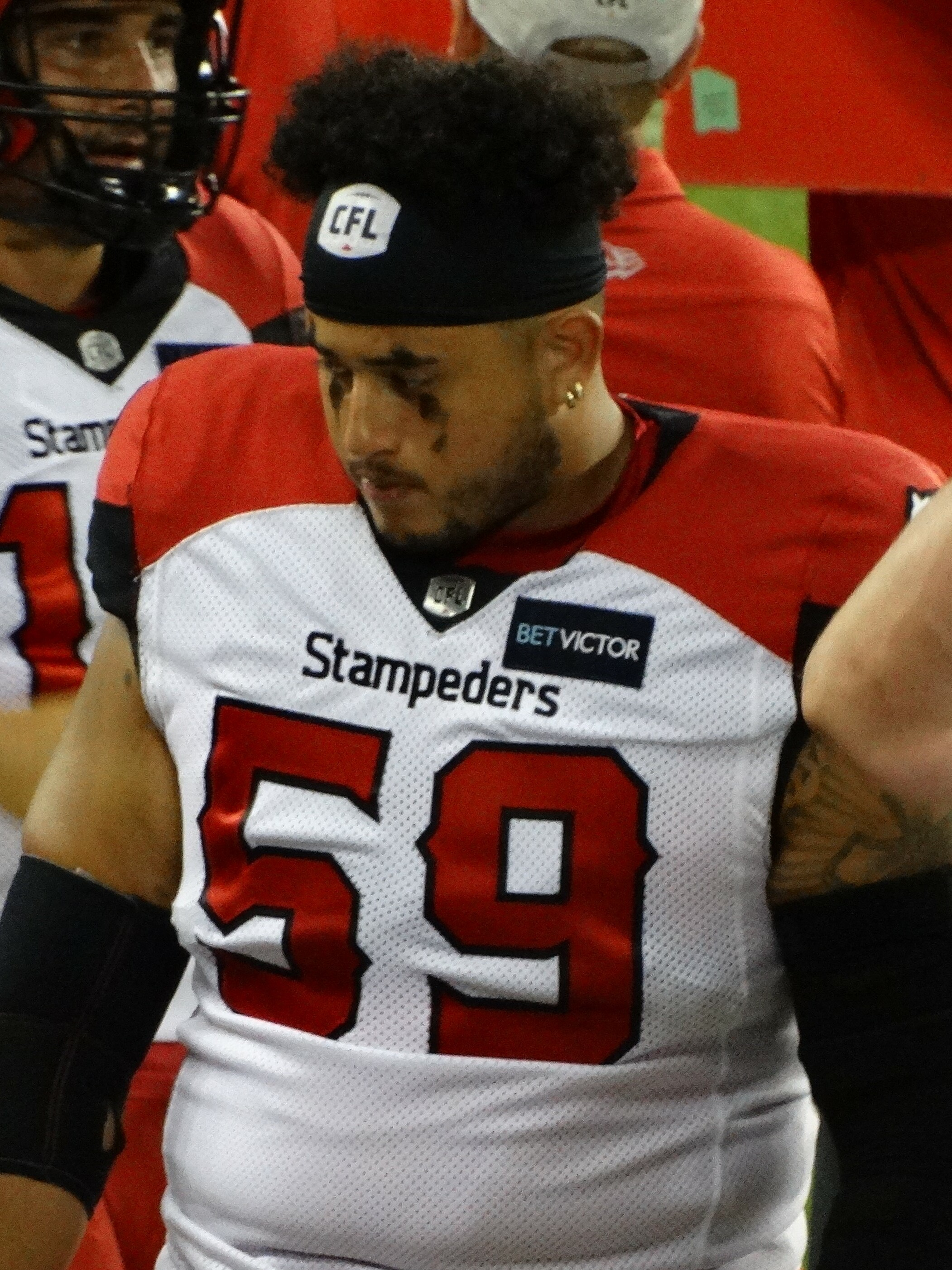
Zamora with the Calgary Stampeders in 2022

=== Calgary Stampeders (first stint) ===
Zamora was drafted in the third round, 26th overall, in the 2020 CFL draft by the Calgary Stampeders, but did not play in 2020 due to the cancellation of the 2020 CFL season. He then signed with the team on January 21, 2021. Zamora spent the 2021 season with the Stampeders on the practice roster and did not dress in a regular season game for the team.

=== Toronto Argonauts ===
On November 3, 2021, it was announced that the Toronto Argonauts had claimed Zamora from the Stampeders' practice roster. As per CFL rules, he was required to play in the Argonauts' game in the following week, where he made his professional debut on November 12, 2021, against the Hamilton Tiger-Cats. He then made his first career start on November 16, 2021, against the Edmonton Elks, at centre. Zamora made his playoff debut in the East Final two weeks later, but the Argonauts lost to the Tiger-Cats.

Zamora played in the first two games of the 2022 season, but was released on July 2, 2022.

=== Calgary Stampeders (second stint) ===
On July 11, 2022, it was announced that Zamora had re-signed with the Stampeders. He was released on November 7, 2022.

== Personal life ==
Zamora is fluent in Spanish.
