= Zack Sanchez =

American football player (born 1993)

No. 31
- Position: Cornerback

Personal information
- Born: October 11, 1993 (age 33); Fort Worth, Texas, U.S.
- Listed height: 5 ft 11 in (1.80 m)
- Listed weight: 185 lb (84 kg)

Career information
- High school: Central (Fort Worth)
- College: Oklahoma
- NFL draft: 2016: 5th round, 141st overall pick

Career history
- Carolina Panthers (2016–2017); San Antonio Commanders (2019); Saskatchewan Roughriders (2020)

Awards and highlights
- Second-team All-American (2015); 2× First-team All-Big 12 (2014, 2015)

Career NFL statistics
- Total tackles: 9
- Stats at Pro Football Reference

Zack Sanchez (born October 11, 1993) is an American former professional football player who was a cornerback for the Carolina Panthers of the National Football League (NFL). He played college football for the Oklahoma Sooners.

== Early life ==
Sanchez attended Central High School in Keller, Texas. He originally committed to Baylor University to play college football, but changed his choice to the University of Oklahoma.

== College career ==
After redshirting his freshman year at Oklahoma in 2012, Sanchez became a starter in 2013. He remained a starter throughout his career, finishing with 37 career starts. For his career he recorded 134 tackles, 15 interceptions and three touchdowns. After his junior year, Sanchez entered the 2016 NFL draft.

== Professional career ==
Pre-draft measurables
Height	Weight	Arm length	Hand span	40-yard dash	10-yard split	20-yard split	20-yard shuttle	Three-cone drill	Vertical jump	Broad jump	Bench press
5 ft 11 in (1.80 m)	185 lb (84 kg)	31 3/8 in (0.80 m)	9 3/8 in (0.24 m)	4.50 s	1.49 s	2.28 s	4.51 s	7.12 s	35 1/2 in (0.90 m)	9 ft 8 in (2.95 m)	19 reps
All values from 2016 NFL Scouting Combine or Oklahoma Pro Day

=== Carolina Panthers ===
Sanchez was selected in the fifth round, 141st overall, by the Carolina Panthers in the 2016 NFL draft. On September 3, 2016, he was waived by the Panthers as part of final roster cuts and was signed to the practice squad the next day. Sanchez was promoted to the active roster on October 7. He was placed on injured reserve on November 25, with a groin injury.

On September 1, 2017, Sanchez was waived/injured by the Panthers and placed on injured reserve. He was released on September 7. Sanchez was re-signed to the Panthers' practice squad on October 17.

Sanchez signed a reserve/future contract with the Panthers on January 8, 2018. On May 14, Sanchez was waived by the Panthers.

=== San Antonio Commanders ===
On October 12, 2018, Sanchez signed with the San Antonio Commanders of the AAF. In the season opener against the San Diego Fleet, Sanchez picked off a Philip Nelson pass in the endzone to seal the victory for the Commanders. The league ceased operations in April 2019.

=== Saskatchewan Roughriders ===
Sanchez signed with the Saskatchewan Roughriders of the Canadian Football League on March 3, 2020. He was released by the Roughriders on July 3, 2021.

== Personal life ==
Sanchez's mother is of Mexican heritage.
