= Du'Vonta Lampkin =

American football player (1997–2022)

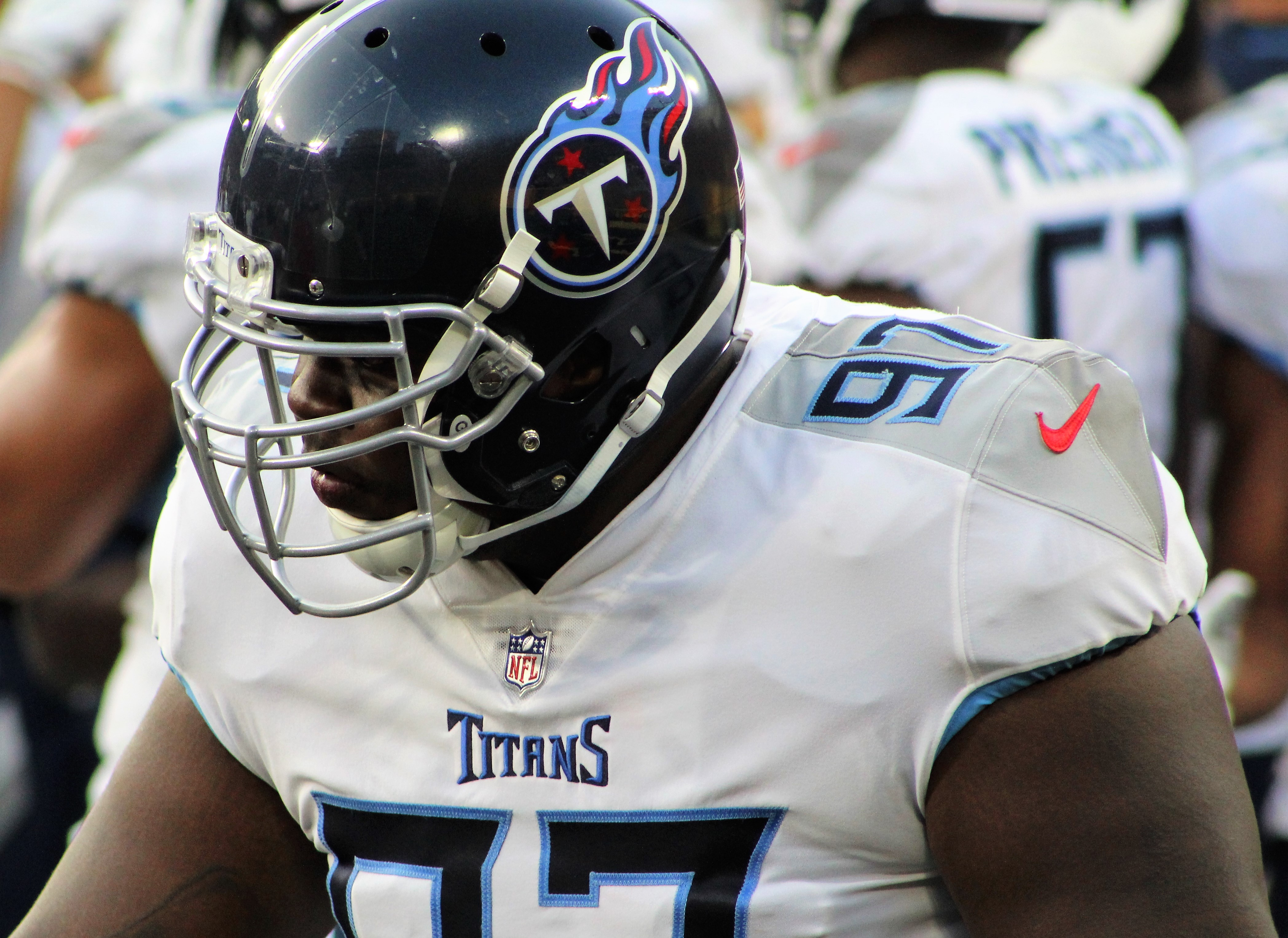
- Lampkin with the Tennessee Titans in 2018

No. 97, 98
- Position: Defensive tackle

Personal information
- Born: January 7, 1997; Houston, Texas, U.S.
- Died: May 5, 2022 (aged 25); Dallas, Texas, U.S.
- Listed height: 6 ft 4 in (1.93 m)
- Listed weight: 335 lb (152 kg)

Career information
- High school: Cypress Falls (Houston, Texas)
- College: Oklahoma
- NFL draft: 2018: undrafted

Career history
- Tennessee Titans (2018)*; Massachusetts Pirates (2019)
- * Offseason or practice squad member only

Du'Vonta Lampkin (January 7, 1997 – May 5, 2022) was an American football defensive tackle. He played college football for the Oklahoma Sooners.

== Early life ==
Lampkin attended Cypress Falls High School in Houston, Texas. As a senior, he tallied 81 tackles (38 for loss), 16 sacks, and eight forced fumbles. He committed to play football for the Oklahoma Sooners in November 2013, but decommitted in April 2014. He then committed and signed to play for the Texas Longhorns, but due to academic issues, was unable to attend Texas. He then enrolled at Oklahoma and joined the football team on scholarship.

== College career ==
Lampkin did not play as a true freshman in 2015 and redshirted.

As a redshirt freshman in 2016, Lampkin played in five games, missing six due to suspension. He tallied five tackles (two for loss) and two quarterback hurries.

In 2017, as a redshirt sophomore, Lampkin played in 12 of Oklahoma's 14 games, missing two games due to academic issues. In 12 games, he recorded 23 tackles (five for loss) and one sack. After the season, he decided to forgo the remaining two years of eligibility, but ended up undrafted.

== Professional career ==
After going undrafted in the 2018 NFL draft, Lampkin participated in the Baltimore Ravens rookie mini-camp, but was not signed. On July 31, 2018, Lampkin signed with the Tennessee Titans. He was waived on September 1, 2018.

Lampkin signed with the Massachusetts Pirates of the National Arena League for the 2019 season. Lampkin appeared in three games and recorded one tackle.

== Death ==
On May 5, 2022, Lampkin died after being shot in a Dallas apartment. On July 8, 2022, Dallas police officers arrested two people, Antwan Franklin and Erick Garcia, for the murder of Lampkin. Franklin reportedly set up the fatal robbery of his friend Lampkin. On December 12, 2024, Franklin was found guilty of capital murder and sentenced to life in prison.
