= Dominique Alexander =

American football player (born 1995)

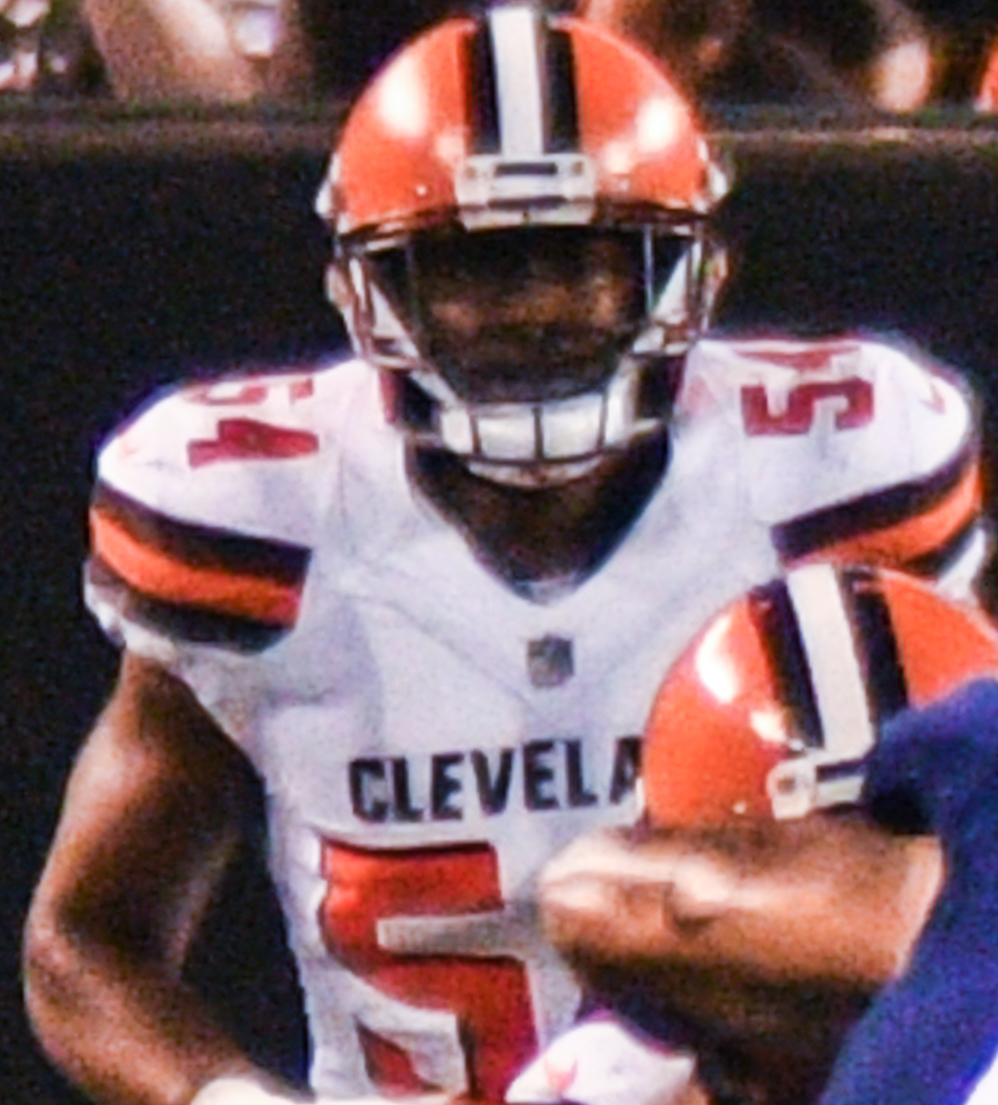
- Alexander with the Cleveland Browns in 2017

No. 54
- Position: Linebacker

Personal information
- Born: April 20, 1995 (age 31); Tulsa, Oklahoma, U.S.
- Listed height: 6 ft 0 in (1.83 m)
- Listed weight: 235 lb (107 kg)

Career information
- High school: Booker T. Washington (Tulsa)
- College: Oklahoma
- NFL draft: 2016: undrafted

Career history
- Cleveland Browns (2016–2017)

Awards and highlights
- Second-team All-Big 12 (2014); Big 12 Defensive Freshman of the Year (2013)

Career NFL statistics
- Total tackles: 8
- Fumble recoveries: 1
- Stats at Pro Football Reference

Dominique E'Shay Alexander (born April 20, 1995) is an American former professional football player who was a linebacker in the National Football League (NFL). He played college football for the Oklahoma Sooners. He signed with the Cleveland Browns as an undrafted free agent in 2016.

== Early life ==
Alexander attended Booker T. Washington High School in Tulsa, Oklahoma. While in high school, he played for the Hornets football team. He was considered a three-star recruit by Rivals.com and committed to the University of Oklahoma to play college football.

== College career ==
As a true freshman at Oklahoma in 2013, Alexander played in all 13 games and started eight. He was named the Big 12 Defensive Freshman of the Year after recording 80 tackles and a sack. As a sophomore, he started all 13 games and had a team-leading 108 tackles and 2.5 sacks. He again started all 13 games his junior year and again led the team in tackles with 103 while also recording a sack and an interception. After the season, he entered the 2016 NFL draft.

== Professional career ==
Coming out of college, Alexander was projected as a fifth or sixth round selection and ranked as the eight best inside linebacker by NFLDraftScout.com. He was invited to the NFL Scouting Combine and completed the broad jump, vertical, and bench press but did not participate in any running drills due to an injury. On March 9, 2016, he attended Oklahoma's Pro Day and was able to complete the running drills required but stood on his combine numbers in the drills he completed there. While many scouts gave him positive reviews for his running ability, tackling, talent in man coverage, and his speed many discounted him for his size, strength, issues getting off blocks, and his lack of instinctual ability.

Pre-draft measurables
Height	Weight	Arm length	Hand span	40-yard dash	10-yard split	20-yard split	20-yard shuttle	Three-cone drill	Vertical jump	Broad jump	Bench press
6 ft 0 in (1.83 m)	232 lb (105 kg)	32 1/4	9 in (0.23 m)	4.76 s	1.61 s	2.76 s	4.57 s	7.84 s	28 1/2 in (0.72 m)	8 ft 8 in (2.64 m)	17 reps
All values from NFL Combine and Oklahoma's Pro Day

After going unselected in the 2016 NFL draft, Alexander signed with the Cleveland Browns on May 5, 2016.

On May 5, 2016, the Cleveland Browns signed Alexander to a three-year, $1.61 million contract.

Alexander entered training camp battling for a position as a backup inside linebacker with veterans Justin Tuggle, Tank Carder, and rookie Scooby Wright. Alexander entered the regular season as the backup left inside linebacker behind Demario Davis. He played in 14 games primarily on special teams, recording seven tackles.

On October 3, 2017, Alexander was placed on injured reserve.

On May 3, 2018, Alexander was waived by the Browns.

== Personal life ==
Alexander was raised by his parents, Derrick Alexander Sr. and Nicole Holman-Alexander. His father player college football at University of Oklahoma and his brother, Derrick Alexander Jr. currently plays defensive lineman at Tulsa. He also has a son.
