= Will Sunderland =

American gridiron football player (born 1996)

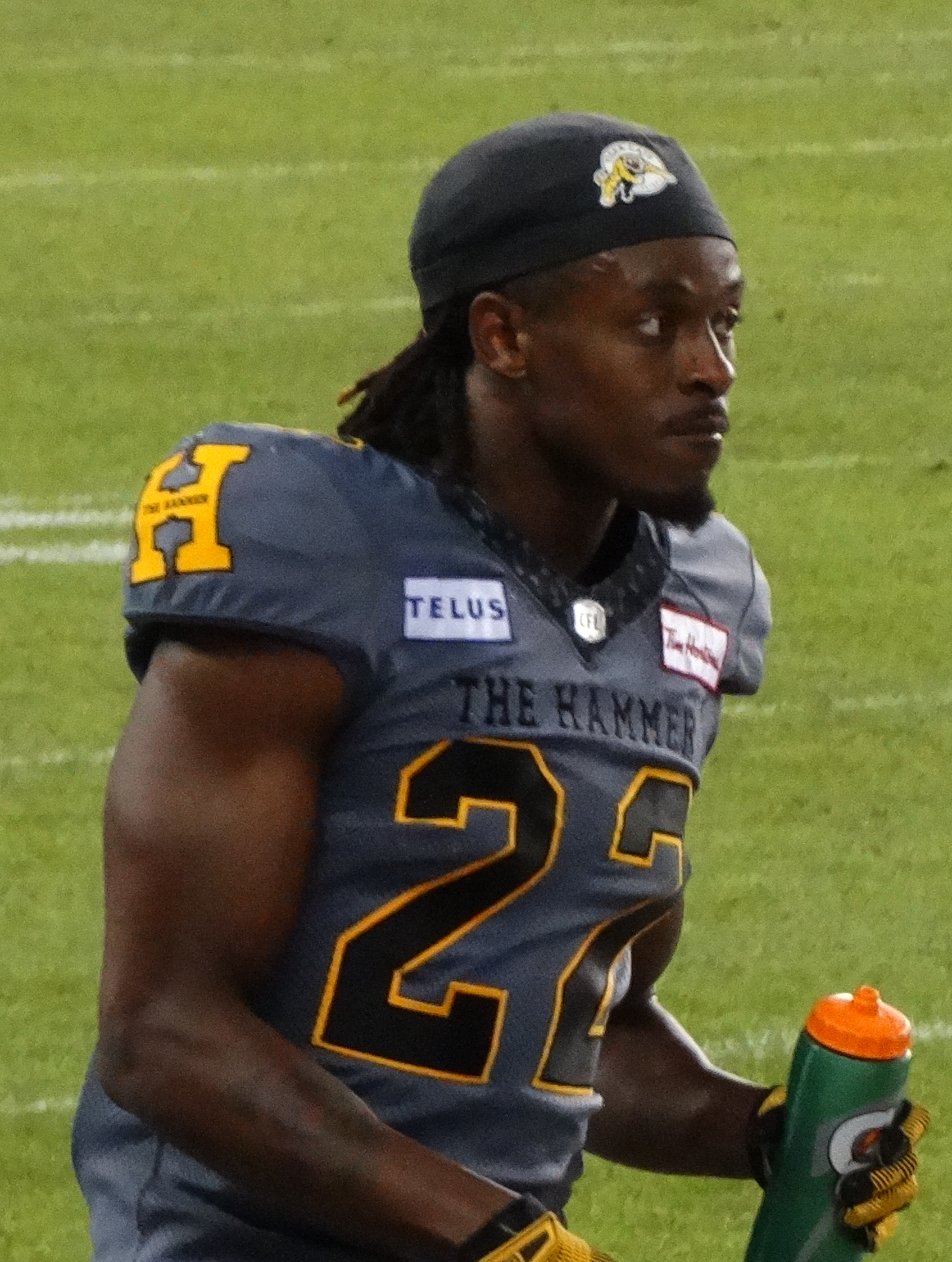
- Sunderland with the Hamilton Tiger-Cats in 2024

No. 20
- Position: Defensive back

Personal information
- Born: September 11, 1996 (age 30); Midwest City, Oklahoma, U.S.
- Listed height: 6 ft 2 in (1.88 m)
- Listed weight: 196 lb (89 kg)

Career information
- High school: Midwest City
- College: Oklahoma, Troy
- NFL draft: 2020: undrafted

Career history
- 2020: Green Bay Packers*
- 2020: Indianapolis Colts*
- 2021: Seattle Seahawks*
- 2021: Atlanta Falcons*
- 2022: Saskatchewan Roughriders*
- 2022–2024: Hamilton Tiger-Cats
- 2025: Toronto Argonauts*
- 2026: Orlando Pirates*
- * Offseason or practice squad member only

Awards and highlights
- First-team All-Sun Belt (2019)
- Stats at Pro Football Reference
- Stats at CFL.ca

Will Sunderland Jr. (born September 11, 1996) is an American professional football defensive back. He played college football at Oklahoma and Troy. He has also been a member of the Green Bay Packers, Indianapolis Colts, Seattle Seahawks, and Atlanta Falcons of the National Football League (NFL), the Saskatchewan Roughriders, Hamilton Tiger-Cats, and Toronto Argonauts of the Canadian Football League (CFL) and the Orlando Pirates of the Indoor Football League (IFL).

== Early life ==
Will Sunderland Jr. played high school football at Midwest City High School in Midwest City, Oklahoma.

== College career ==
Sunderland played college football at Oklahoma from 2015 to 2016. He played in eight games in 2015, recording three tackles. He appeared in eight games in 2016, totaling 15 tackles, one interception and one pass breakup. Sunderland was charged with second-degree burglary in June 2017 and later dismissed from the team.

Sunderland played at Troy from 2018 to 2019. He played in 13 games, starting two, in 2018, recording 21 tackles. He started 11 games in 2019, accumulating 38 tackles and four interceptions, earning first-team All-Sun Belt Conference honors.

== Professional career ==
=== Green Bay Packers ===
Sunderland signed with the Green Bay Packers of the National Football League (NFL) on April 30, 2020, after going undrafted in the 2020 NFL draft. He was waived/injured on September 5 and placed on injured reserve on September 6. He was waived from injured reserve on September 9, 2020.

=== Indianapolis Colts ===
Sunderland was signed to the practice squad of the Indianapolis Colts of the NFL on October 27, 2020. He was signed to a futures contract on January 11, 2021. He was released by the Colts on May 6, 2021.

=== Seattle Seahawks ===
Sunderland signed with the NFL's Seattle Seahawks on June 14, 2021. He was released on August 31, 2021.

=== Atlanta Falcons ===
Sunderland was signed to the practice squad of the Atlanta Falcons of the NFL on December 14, 2021. He was released by the Falcons on December 21, 2021.

=== Saskatchewan Roughriders ===
Sunderland signed with the Saskatchewan Roughriders of the Canadian Football League (CFL) on January 25, 2022. He was released on June 2, 2022.

=== Hamilton Tiger-Cats ===
Sunderland was signed to the practice roster of the Hamilton Tiger-Cats of the CFL on October 11, 2022. He was promoted to the active roster on October 28 and started one game, recording one tackle on defense, before being moved back to the practice roster. He was signed to a futures contract on November 8, 2022. Sunderland was moved between the practice roster and active roster several times during the 2023 season. Overall, he dressed in eight games, starting four, in 2023, totaling 14 tackles on defense and one special teams tackle.

In 2024, Sunderland played in eight regular season games where he had 25 defensive tackles and one special teams tackle. He became a free agent upon the expiry of his contract on February 11, 2025.

=== Toronto Argonauts ===
On February 11, 2025, it was announced that Sunderland had signed with the Toronto Argonauts. However, he was part of the final cuts on June 1, 2025.

=== Orlando Pirates ===
Sunderland signed with the Orlando Pirates of the Indoor Football League on March 2, 2026. He was released on May 8.
