= Canada Prep Academy =

Private school in St Catharines, Ontario, Canada

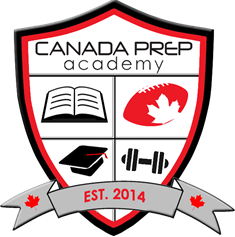

Location
- St Catharines, Ontario, Ontario; Canada; 43.0089937°N 79.2349057°W

Information
- Type: Private; All-boys; Boarding
- Established: 2014
- Grades: 11–12, postgraduate
- Enrollment: 37
- Colours: Red, white, black, and silver
- Mascot: Raiders
- Website: www.canadaprepacademy.ca

Canada Prep Academy, formerly Canada Prep Football Academy, is a private, all-boys preparatory school located in St Catharines, Ontario, Canada. They play a full season of American football exclusively against US high schools.

The school has an enrollment of about 30 students, including grade 11, 12 and postgrad (PG) students. Students come from across Canada, including Ontario, Quebec, Alberta, Saskatchewan, and British Columbia. A number of international students from the United Kingdom, United States and Brazil were enrolled. Most students board on campus. There are five teachers and three coaches, some of whom live on campus and act as residential supervisors.

== History ==
Canada Prep Academy began in the former Merritton High School building, once the community high school until its closure due to low enrollment in 1999. The building was purchased by Pinehurst School in 2001, and operated as Pinehurst until November 2013. Canada Prep Academy, then Canada Prep Football Academy, was founded in January 2012 as a football program which aimed to fill the void created by the closure of the similar but controversial Niagara Football Academy. The head coach of the Niagara Spartans, Geoff McArthur, came to lead the Canada Prep Raiders, as they were now called. Canada Prep Academy partnered with Pinehurst School to offer its academics, and operated a separate wing and campus of Pinehurst. This partnership remained until Pinehurst ceased operations due to its own low enrollment numbers.

Canada Prep Academy, the school, was founded in 2014 to allow the program to have control over its own academics. Its original teacher, Patrick Fife, became principal and oversaw the process of becoming inspected by the Ministry of Education. The original Canada Prep logo, a red football with a white maple leaf, became only one part of a larger school crest that emphasizes academics, university preparation, and fitness.

In January 2015, Canada Prep Academy announced that it was relocating out of the city to the countryside where there was room to grow and expand.

== Academics ==
Canada Prep Academy graduates earn the Ontario Secondary School Diploma (OSSD), while also being prepared for the eligibility requirements of American universities. The majority of courses offered are NCAA core courses of English, math, science, and social studies. Class sizes usually vary between 8 and 12 students, and teaching approaches consist of hands-on and active learning opportunities that are geared towards boys' learning styles. Students also have opportunities to prepare for the SAT and ACT, as well as get one-on-one help and tutoring during evening study hall.

Canada Prep Academy is a member of the Ontario Federation of Independent Schools.

== Athletics ==
Canada Prep Academy specializes in American football and provides a varsity football team that travels to the United States on weekends from late August to early November in order to compete against American high schools. Notable opponents include Orchard Lake-St. Mary's Preparatory School, Brother Rice High School, St. Ignatius High School in Cleveland, St. Edward High School near Cleveland, and Steubenville High School, among others.

Unlike other Canadian high schools, whose coaches are usually teachers or staff members with other roles at the school, Canada Prep Academy employs an experienced coaching staff of coaches with backgrounds in the NCAA, NFL, or CFL. Previous Head Coach Geoff McArthur is a former All-American wide receiver from University of California, Berkeley, who previously coached at Lindenwood University, a Division II school in Missouri.

In the off-season, the football focus continues as students receive daily training in fitness, speed/agility, and football skills.

== Recruiting ==
Canada Prep Academy prepares student-athletes for NCAA and CIS entrance requirements, and offers SAT and ACT tutoring. The school visited by Division I coaches from universities such as Nevada, Ohio State, Buffalo, Mississippi State, Fordham, Wisconsin, and more. One current student, Neville Gallimore, is the first international player to attend The Opening and to be invited to the US Army All-American Bowl. Gallimore has earned 28 Division I offers. Gallimore was selected in the 3rd round of the NFL draft by the Dallas Cowboys after playing his college ball at Oklahoma.

== School life ==
Canada Prep Academy offers on-campus boarding in former classrooms that have been rezoned and converted to dormitories. Boarding is akin to a university setting. Students live with a roommate, and washrooms/showers, laundry facilities, and a kitchen are all located on site. Students are served three meals a day on weekdays, and a large sized brunch and dinner on weekends. Boarding students also used to have evening access to the gymnasium and fitness centre. Students are taken on a trip to Niagara Falls.

=== Notable students and alumni ===
- Jack Cassar, Class of 2016, CFL player with the Toronto Argonauts
- Neville Gallimore, Class of 2015 student with 28 Division I offers. Third round 2020 NFL draft pick by the Dallas Cowboys.
- Troy Hansen, Class of 2015 with full offer to North Dakota
- Brendan O'Leary-Orange, Class of 2014, commit to Nevada
- Brady Oliveira, Class of 2015, commit to North Dakota
- Andrew Peirson, Gannon University college football player
- Justin Vaughn, Fordham University college football player
- Jonathan Zamora, Seton Hill University college football player
