= Neville Gallimore =

Canadian football player (born 1997)

No. 90 – Chicago Bears
- Position: Nose tackle
- Roster status: Active

Personal information
- Born: January 17, 1997 (age 29); Ottawa, Ontario, Canada
- Listed height: 6 ft 2 in (1.88 m)
- Listed weight: 307 lb (139 kg)

Career information
- High school: Canada Prep Academy (St. Catharines, Ontario)
- College: Oklahoma (2015–2019)
- NFL draft: 2020: 3rd round, 82nd overall pick
- CFL draft: 2020: 8th round, 71st overall pick

Career history
- Dallas Cowboys (2020–2023); Miami Dolphins (2024)*; Los Angeles Rams (2024); Indianapolis Colts (2025); Chicago Bears (2026–present)
- * Offseason or practice squad member only

Awards and highlights
- Second-team All-Big 12 (2019)

Career NFL statistics as of 2025
- Total tackles: 147
- Sacks: 7.5
- Pass deflections: 6
- Stats at Pro Football Reference

Neville Gallimore (born January 17, 1997) is a Canadian professional football nose tackle for the Chicago Bears of the National Football League (NFL). He played college football for the Oklahoma Sooners, and was selected by the Dallas Cowboys in the third round of the 2020 NFL draft.

== Early life ==
Gallimore's parents were born and raised in Jamaica. He originally attended St. Patrick's High School, where he played defensive tackle. Gallimore opted to transfer to the Canada Prep Academy in St. Catharines, Ontario, which allowed him to travel through the United States and compete against some of the top high school football programs.

In 2015, he was the first Canadian-born player to be invited to participate in the U.S. Army All-American Bowl, but couldn’t suit up because of a knee injury. After receiving 30 scholarship offers from U.S. schools, Gallimore committed to the University of Oklahoma to play college football.

== College career ==
Gallimore redshirted his first year at Oklahoma in 2015. As a freshman in 2016, he played in all 13 games, starting six of the last eight contests, while recording 40 tackles (4 for loss) and one sack.

As a sophomore in 2017, he played in 12 of 14 games, starting the first five contests, before missing 2 due to injury. He tallied 28 tackles (one for loss) and one sack. He had a career-high 9 tackles and half a sack against Tulane University.

As a junior in 2018, he started 13 of 14 games, posting 50 tackles (5 for loss), 3 sacks and 2 forced fumbles. He had 5 tackles in the Big 12 Championship 39–27 win against the University of Texas. He made 8 tackles against the United States Military Academy.

As a senior in 2019, he started 14 games, registering 30 tackles (7.5 for loss), 4 sacks and 2 forced fumbles. He finished his college career with 148 total tackles (18 for loss), 9 sacks, 5 forced fumbles and 3 College Football Playoff appearances.

== Professional career ==
Pre-draft measurables
Height	Weight	Arm length	Hand span	Wingspan	40-yard dash	10-yard split	20-yard split	20-yard shuttle	Three-cone drill	Vertical jump	Broad jump	Bench press
6 ft 2 in (1.88 m)	304 lb (138 kg)	32 3/4 in (0.83 m)	9 5/8 in (0.24 m)	6 ft 5 1/4 in (1.96 m)	4.79 s	1.71 s	2.79 s	4.65 s	7.97 s	30.0 in (0.76 m)	9 ft 4 in (2.84 m)	23 reps
All values from NFL Combine/Pro Day

=== Dallas Cowboys ===
On April 24, 2020, Gallimore was selected by the Dallas Cowboys in the third round (82nd overall) of the 2020 NFL draft. On April 30, he was selected in the eighth (71st overall) and final round of the 2020 CFL draft by the Saskatchewan Roughriders; he was rated as the #1 Canadian draft prospect for 2020 prior to the NFL and CFL drafts. Gallimore was declared inactive in Week 3 and Week 4. He recorded his first NFL tackle in a Week 5 win of 34-37 over the New York Giants. Even though he played just 20 snaps in the first four contests, he was named the starter at the three-technique defensive tackle position after Gerald McCoy and Trysten Hill were lost for the season with injuries. His best game came in Week 9 against the then-undefeated Pittsburgh Steelers, when he contributed to limit their offense to 46 rushing yards, while making 3 tackles (one for loss) and one quarterback hit. He appeared in 14 games with 9 starts, collecting 26 tackles (4 for loss), 0.5 sacks, 12 quarterback pressures and one pass defended.

In 2021, he suffered a dislocated right elbow injury in the second preseason game against the Arizona Cardinals. On September 2, 2021, Gallimore was placed on injured reserve to start the season. He missed the first 12 games and was activated on December 11 for the Week 14 contest against the Washington Commanders. Gallimore struggled to return from his injury, having admittedly battled with his mental recovery as well. He started 4 out of 5 games at defensive tackle, registering 10 tackles (2 for loss), 1.5 sacks and 6 quarterback pressures.

In 2022, he was passed on the depth chart by Johnathan Hankins. He appeared in 16 games with one start at defensive tackle, posting 33 tackles (one for loss), one sack and 6 quarterback pressures. He was declared inactive in the Week 7 game against the Detroit Lions, to allow the team to activate Hill. He had 4 tackles in the season finale against the Washington Commanders. He was declared inactive in the Wild Card playoff game against the Tampa Bay Buccaneers.

In 2023, he lost additional playing time after the Cowboys drafted defensive tackle Mazi Smith in the first round. He appeared in all 17 games as a backup, tallying 15 tackles (one for loss), one sack, 7 quarterback pressures and one pass defensed. He was not re-signed after the season.

=== Miami Dolphins ===
On March 15, 2024, Gallimore signed with the Miami Dolphins. He was released on August 27.

=== Los Angeles Rams ===
On August 28, 2024, Gallimore signed with the Los Angeles Rams. He appeared in 14 games (4 starts) and collected 19 tackles (seven solo). In the Wild Card Round win over the Minnesota Vikings, he had 1.5 sacks. In the Divisional Round to the Philadelphia Eagles, he had two sacks and recorded a safety in the 28–22 loss.

=== Indianapolis Colts ===
On March 12, 2025, Gallimore signed a one-year deal with the Indianapolis Colts. He played in all 17 games with eight starts, recording a career-high 38 tackles, 3.5 sacks, and three passes defensed.

=== Chicago Bears ===
On March 11, 2026, Gallimore signed a two-year, $12 million contract with the Chicago Bears.

== Career statistics ==
=== NFL ===
Legend
	Led the league
**Bold**	Career high

==== Regular season ====
Year	Team	Games		Tackles						Interceptions						Fumbles				
Year	Team	GP	GS	Cmb	Solo	Ast	Sck	TFL	Sfty	Int	Yds	Avg	Lng	TD	PD	FF	Fum	FR	Yds	TD
2020	DAL	14	9	28	11	17	0.5	**4**	0	0	0	0.0	0	0	1	0	0	0	0	0
2021	DAL	5	4	13	5	8	1.5	3	0	0	0	0.0	0	0	0	0	0	0	0	0
2022	DAL	16	1	33	16	17	1.0	2	0	0	0	0.0	0	0	1	0	0	0	0	0
2023	DAL	17	0	16	8	8	1.0	2	0	0	0	0.0	0	0	1	0	0	0	0	0
2024	LAR	14	4	19	7	12	0.0	0	0	0	0	0.0	0	0	0	0	0	0	0	0
2025	IND	17	8	**38**	**18**	**20**	**3.5**	**4**	0	0	0	0.0	0	0	**3**	0	0	0	0	0
Career		83	26	147	65	82	7.5	15	0	0	0	0.0	0	0	6	0	0	0	0	0

==== Postseason ====
Year	Team	Games		Tackles						Interceptions						Fumbles				
Year	Team	GP	GS	Cmb	Solo	Ast	Sck	TFL	Sfty	Int	Yds	Avg	Lng	TD	PD	FF	Fum	FR	Yds	TD
2021	DAL	1	1	3	1	2	0.0	0	0	0	0	0.0	0	0	0	0	0	0	0	0
2022	DAL	1	0	1	1	0	0.0	0	0	0	0	0.0	0	0	0	0	0	0	0	0
2023	DAL	1	0	3	1	2	0.0	0	0	0	0	0.0	0	0	0	0	0	0	0	0
2024	LAR	2	0	**6**	**3**	**3**	**2.5**	**2**	**1**	0	0	0.0	0	0	0	0	0	0	0	0
Career		5	1	13	6	7	2.5	2	1	0	0	0.0	0	0	0	0	0	0	0	0

=== College ===
Season	Team	GP	Defense				
Season	Team	GP	Cmb	TfL	Sck	Int	PD
2016	Oklahoma	11	40	4.0	1.0	0	0
2017	Oklahoma	9	28	1.5	0.5	0	1
2018	Oklahoma	13	50	5.0	3.0	0	0
2019	Oklahoma	13	29	6.5	4.0	0	1
Total		46	147	17.0	8.5	0	2

== Personal life ==
Gallimore got engaged on June 26, 2022 and on March 11, 2023, married Chelsie Stevens.
