= 2014 Oklahoma Sooners football team =

American college football season

2014 Oklahoma Sooners football

Russell Athletic Bowl, L 6–40 vs. Clemson
- Conference: Big 12 Conference
- Record: 8–5 (5–4 Big 12)
- Head coach: Bob Stoops (16th season)
- Co-offensive coordinators: Josh Heupel (4th season); Jay Norvell (4th season)
- Offensive scheme: No-huddle spread
- Defensive coordinator: Mike Stoops (8th season)
- Base defense: 3–4
- Captains: Michael Hunnicutt; Trevor Knight; Chuka Ndulue; Eric Striker; Daryl Williams; Julian Wilson
- Home stadium: Gaylord Family Oklahoma Memorial Stadium

2014 Big 12 Conference football standings
	Conf.				Overall
Team	W		L		W		L
No. 7 Baylor +	8	–	1		11	–	2
No. 3 TCU	–	8	–	1	12	–	1
No. 18 Kansas State	7	–	2		9	–	4
Oklahoma	5	–	4		8	–	5
West Virginia	5	–	4		7	–	6
Texas	5	–	4		6	–	7
Oklahoma State	4	–	5		7	–	6
Texas Tech	2	–	7		4	–	8
Kansas	1	–	8		3	–	9
Iowa State	0	–	9		2	–	10
Rankings from AP Poll

The 2014 Oklahoma Sooners football team represented the University of Oklahoma in the 2014 NCAA Division I FBS football season, the 120th season of Sooner football. The team was led by two-time Walter Camp Coach of the Year Award winner, Bob Stoops, in his 16th season as head coach. They played their home games at Gaylord Family Oklahoma Memorial Stadium in Norman, Oklahoma. They were a member of the Big 12 Conference.

Oklahoma entered the 2014 season ranked 4th in AP Poll and were projected to capture their first Big 12 title since 2012, finishing 1st in the Big 12 media poll. The Sooners won their first four games of the season, before being upset by then-No. 25 TCU. The team also lost to then-No. 14 Kansas State two weeks later & then to No. 10 Baylor, which was the first and only win in Norman for the Bears to date. The Sooners recovered and won their next two games, which included a record-setting performance from freshman running back Samaje Perine, who ran for 427 yards, which broke the single-game rushing record set a week prior by Wisconsin's Melvin Gordon. They entered the season finale against Oklahoma State at 8–3 and ranked 18th in the AP Poll. However, the Sooners lost in overtime, giving the Cowboys their first win in Bedlam since 2011, which also earned them bowl eligibility and their first win in Norman since 2001. Oklahoma finished out the regular season with an 8–4 record, 5–4 in Big 12 play to finish in a three-way tie for fourth place. The Sooners were invited to play in the Russell Athletic Bowl against the Clemson Tigers, where they were defeated by a score of 40–6.

Following the season, Jordan Phillips was selected in the second round of the 2015 NFL draft, along with Geneo Grissom in the third, Daryl Williams and Blake Bell in the fourth, and Tyrus Thompson and Aaron Ripkowski in the sixth.

== Preseason ==
=== Recruits ===
College recruiting (2014)
Name	Hometown	School	Height	Weight	40^{‡}	Commit date
Jonathan Alvarez; OL	Mesquite, Texas	Horn HS	6 ft 3 in (1.91 m)	300 lb (140 kg)	5.76	Sep 10, 2013
Jonathan Alvarez; OL	Recruit ratings: Scout: Rivals: 247Sports: ESPN:					
Mark Andrews; WR	Scottsdale, Arizona	Desert Mountain HS	6 ft 6 in (1.98 m)	225 lb (102 kg)	4.7	Aug 2, 2013
Mark Andrews; WR	Recruit ratings: Scout: Rivals: 247Sports: ESPN:					
Curtis Bolton; LB	Murrieta, California	Vista Murrieta HS	6 ft 2 in (1.88 m)	215 lb (98 kg)	4.6	Aug 25, 2013
Curtis Bolton; LB	Recruit ratings: Scout: Rivals: 247Sports: ESPN:					
Devante Bond; LB	Roseville, California	Sierra CC	6 ft 3 in (1.91 m)	240 lb (110 kg)	4.6	Nov 18, 2013
Devante Bond; LB	Recruit ratings: Scout: Rivals: 247Sports: ESPN:					
Orlando Brown, Jr. OL	Duluth, Georgia	Peachtree Ridge HS	6 ft 8 in (2.03 m)	348 lb (158 kg)	-	Feb 5, 2014
Orlando Brown, Jr. OL	Recruit ratings: Scout: Rivals: 247Sports: ESPN:					
Natrell Curtis; OL	Phoenix, Arizona	Mountain Pointe HS	6 ft 3 in (1.91 m)	325 lb (147 kg)	5.69	Jan 6, 2014
Natrell Curtis; OL	Recruit ratings: Scout: Rivals: 247Sports: ESPN:					
Alex Dalton; OL	Troy, Ohio	Troy HS	6 ft 4 in (1.93 m)	280 lb (130 kg)	5.1	May 17, 2013
Alex Dalton; OL	Recruit ratings: Scout: Rivals: 247Sports: ESPN:					
Tay Evans; LB	Allen, Texas	Allen HS	6 ft 3 in (1.91 m)	202 lb (92 kg)	4.6	Jul 2, 2013
Tay Evans; LB	Recruit ratings: Scout: Rivals: 247Sports: ESPN:					
Dimitri Flowers; ATH	San Antonio, Texas	Churchill HS	6 ft 3 in (1.91 m)	219 lb (99 kg)	4.83	Nov 6, 2013
Dimitri Flowers; ATH	Recruit ratings: Scout: Rivals: 247Sports: ESPN:					
Kenyon Frison; OL	West Valley City, Utah	Granger HS	6 ft 5 in (1.96 m)	281 lb (127 kg)	5.61	Feb 5, 2014
Kenyon Frison; OL	Recruit ratings: Scout: Rivals: 247Sports: ESPN:					
Courtney Garnett; DT	New Orleans, Louisiana	St. Augustine HS	6 ft 2 in (1.88 m)	283 lb (128 kg)	-	Jan 30, 2014
Courtney Garnett; DT	Recruit ratings: Scout: Rivals: 247Sports: ESPN:					
Brandon Glenn; DT	Irving, Texas	Ranchview HS	6 ft 4 in (1.93 m)	255 lb (116 kg)	4.8	Jun 14, 2013
Brandon Glenn; DT	Recruit ratings: Scout: Rivals: 247Sports: ESPN:					
Marcus Green; DB	Cedar Hill, Texas	Cedar Hill HS	6 ft 1 in (1.85 m)	176 lb (80 kg)	4.6	Jul 18, 2013
Marcus Green; DB	Recruit ratings: Scout: Rivals: 247Sports: ESPN:					
Justice Hansen; QB	Edmond, Oklahoma	Edmond Santa Fe HS	6 ft 4 in (1.93 m)	216 lb (98 kg)	4.7	Apr 13, 2013
Justice Hansen; QB	Recruit ratings: Scout: Rivals: 247Sports: ESPN:					
Isaac Ijalana; TE	Mount Holly, New Jersey	Pierce CC	6 ft 5 in (1.96 m)	235 lb (107 kg)	4.6	Dec 15, 2013
Isaac Ijalana; TE	Recruit ratings: Scout: Rivals: 247Sports: ESPN:					
Vontre McQuinnie; DB	DeSoto, Texas	DeSoto HS	6 ft 1 in (1.85 m)	204 lb (93 kg)	4.6	Feb 2, 2013
Vontre McQuinnie; DB	Recruit ratings: Scout: Rivals: 247Sports: ESPN:					
Jeffery Mead; WR	Tulsa, Oklahoma	Union HS	6 ft 6 in (1.98 m)	179 lb (81 kg)	4.55	Jun 22, 2013
Jeffery Mead; WR	Recruit ratings: Scout: Rivals: 247Sports: ESPN:					
Carson Meier; TE	Tulsa, Oklahoma	Union HS	6 ft 7 in (2.01 m)	232 lb (105 kg)	4.7	May 22, 2013
Carson Meier; TE	Recruit ratings: Scout: Rivals: 247Sports: ESPN:					
Joe Mixon; RB	Oakley, California	Freedom HS	6 ft 2 in (1.88 m)	209 lb (95 kg)	4.53	Jan 4, 2014
Joe Mixon; RB	Recruit ratings: Scout: Rivals: 247Sports: ESPN:					
Dwayne Orso, Jr. DE	Homewood, Alabama	Homewood HS	6 ft 6 in (1.98 m)	255 lb (116 kg)	5.61	Nov 17, 2013
Dwayne Orso, Jr. DE	Recruit ratings: Scout: Rivals: 247Sports: ESPN:					
Steven Parker II; DB	Jenks, Oklahoma	Jenks HS	6 ft 2 in (1.88 m)	185 lb (84 kg)	4.5	Feb 4, 2014
Steven Parker II; DB	Recruit ratings: Scout: Rivals: 247Sports: ESPN:					
Joseph Paul; OL	New Orleans, Louisiana	St. Augustine HS	6 ft 6 in (1.98 m)	340 lb (150 kg)	-	Jan 8, 2014
Joseph Paul; OL	Recruit ratings: Scout: Rivals: 247Sports: ESPN:					
Samaje Perine; RB	Pflugerville, Texas	Hendrickson HS	6 ft 0 in (1.83 m)	213 lb (97 kg)	4.4	Mar 13, 2013
Samaje Perine; RB	Recruit ratings: Scout: Rivals: 247Sports: ESPN:					
Michiah Quick; ATH	Fresno, California	Central East HS	6 ft 0 in (1.83 m)	170 lb (77 kg)	4.5	Feb 5, 2014
Michiah Quick; ATH	Recruit ratings: Scout: Rivals: 247Sports: ESPN:					
Jordan Thomas; DB	Klein, Texas	Klein Collins HS	6 ft 1 in (1.85 m)	180 lb (82 kg)	4.5	Jan 29, 2014
Jordan Thomas; DB	Recruit ratings: Scout: Rivals: 247Sports: ESPN:					
Dallis Todd; WR	La Mirada, California	La Mirada HS	6 ft 5 in (1.96 m)	210 lb (95 kg)	4.5	Apr 15, 2013
Dallis Todd; WR	Recruit ratings: Scout: Rivals: 247Sports: ESPN:					
Tito Windham; DB	Gulfport, Mississippi	Harrison Central HS	5 ft 10 in (1.78 m)	181 lb (82 kg)	4.69	May 17, 2013
Tito Windham; DB	Recruit ratings: Scout: Rivals: 247Sports: ESPN:					
Overall recruit ranking: Scout: 13 Rivals: 15 247Sports: 14 ESPN: 13
‡ Refers to 40-yard dash; Note: In many cases, Scout, Rivals, 247Sports, On3, and ESPN may conflict in their listings of height, weight and 40 time.; In these cases, the average was taken. ESPN grades are on a 100-point scale.; Sources: "2014 Oklahoma Football Commitment List". Rivals.; "2014 Oklahoma Commits". Scout.; "2014 Player Commitments – Oklahoma". ESPN.; "Scout.com Team Recruiting Rankings". Scout.; "2014 Team Ranking". Rivals.com.

=== Award watch lists ===
- John Mackey Award

Blake Bell
Taylor McNamara

- Lou Groza Award

Michael Hunnicutt

- Lombardi Award

Eric Striker

- Jim Thorpe Award

Zack Sanchez

- Butkus Award

Frank Shannon
Eric Striker

- Maxwell Award

Trevor Knight

- Rimington Trophy

Ty Darlington

- Outland Trophy

Daryl Williams

- Davey O'Brien Award

Trevor Knight

- Chuck Bednarik Award

Frank Shannon
Eric Striker
Charles Tapper

- Walter Camp Award

Trevor Knight

- Bronko Nagurski Trophy

Zack Sanchez
Eric Striker
Charles Tapper

== Schedule ==
Date	Time	Opponent	Rank	Site	TV	Result	Attendance
August 30	6:00 p.m.	Louisiana Tech*	No. 4	Gaylord Family Oklahoma Memorial Stadium; Norman, OK	FSN PPV	W 48–16	85,063
September 6	11:00 a.m.	at Tulsa*	No. 4	Chapman Stadium; Tulsa, OK	ABC/ESPN2	W 52–7	29,357
September 13	7:00 p.m.	Tennessee*	No. 4	Gaylord Family Oklahoma Memorial Stadium; Norman, OK	ABC	W 34–10	85,622
September 20	6:30 p.m.	at West Virginia	No. 4	Mountaineer Field; Morgantown, WV	FOX	W 45–33	61,908
October 4	2:30 p.m.	at No. 25 TCU	No. 4	Amon G. Carter Stadium; Fort Worth, TX	FOX	L 33–37	47,394
October 11	11:00 a.m.	vs. Texas	No. 11	Cotton Bowl; Dallas, TX (Red River Showdown)	ABC	W 31–26	92,100
October 18	11:00 a.m.	No. 14 Kansas State^{†}	No. 11	Gaylord Family Oklahoma Memorial Stadium; Norman, OK	ESPN	L 30–31	85,019
November 1	11:00 a.m.	at Iowa State	No. 18	Jack Trice Stadium; Ames, IA	FS1	W 59–14	50,784
November 8	11:00 a.m.	No. 12 Baylor	No. 15	Gaylord Family Oklahoma Memorial Stadium; Norman, OK	FS1	L 14–48	85,048
November 15	2:30 p.m.	at Texas Tech		Jones AT&T Stadium; Lubbock, TX	ESPN	W 42–30	59,014
November 22	11:00 a.m.	Kansas	No. 21	Gaylord Family Oklahoma Memorial Stadium; Norman, OK	FS1	W 44–7	84,908
December 6	2:30 p.m.	Oklahoma State	No. 20	Gaylord Family Oklahoma Memorial Stadium; Norman, OK (Bedlam Series)	FS1	L 35–38 ^{OT}	85,312
December 29	4:30 p.m.	vs. No. 17 Clemson*		Orlando Citrus Bowl Stadium; Orlando, FL (Russell Athletic Bowl)	ESPN	L 6–40	40,071
*Non-conference game; ^{†}Homecoming; Rankings from AP Poll and CFP Rankings after October 28 released prior to game; All times are in Central time

== Roster ==
2014 Oklahoma Sooners football team roster
Players
Coaches
Offense

Pos.	#	Name	Class
WR	1	K. J. Young	Fr
WR	3	Sterling Shepard	Jr
QB	4	Terrance Hamlet	Fr
WR	5	Durron Neal	Jr
QB	6	Baker Mayfield	So
WR	7	Dannon Cavil	Fr
WR	8	Austin Bennett	So
QB	9	Trevor Knight (C)	So
TE	10	Blake Bell	Sr
WR	11	Dorial Green-Beckham	Jr
WR	12	Derrick Woods	So
QB	14	Cody Thomas	Fr
WR	15	Jeffery Mead	Fr
WR	16	Michiah Quick	Fr
WR	17	Jordan Smallwood	Fr
WR	19	Dallis Todd	Fr
RB	20	Joe Mixon	Fr
RB	21	Keith Ford	So
RB	25	David Smith	So
RB	28	Alex Ross	So
RB	32	Samaje Perine	Fr
FB	32	Jaxon Uhles	So
RB	34	Daniel Brooks	So
RB	35	Ezel McIntee	Fr
FB	36	Dimitri Flowers	Fr
FB	41	Justin Fa'aola	Jr
TE	45	Carson Meier	Fr
FB	47	Joe Palange	So
FB	48	Aaron Ripkowski	Sr
OL	52	John-Philip Hughes	Jr
OL	53	Tony Feo	Sr
OL	54	Nila Kasitati	Jr
OL	55	Josiah St. John	Jr
OL	56	Ty Darlington	Jr
OL	63	Alex Dalton	Fr
OL	64	Dylan Hartsook	So
OL	65	Nick Hardaway	So
OL	66	Riley Nolan	So
OL	68	Jonathan Alvarez	Fr
OL	69	Joseph Paul	Fr
OL	70	Christian Daimler	Fr
OL	71	Tyrus Thompson	Sr
OL	72	Derek Farniok	Jr
OL	73	Kenyon Frison	Fr
OL	74	Adam Shead	Sr
OL	75	Tyler Evans	Sr
OL	76	Sam Grant	So
OL	77	Dionte Savage	Sr
OL	78	Orlando Brown	Fr
OL	79	Daryl Williams (C)	Sr
TE	80	Isaac Ijalana	So
WR	81	Mark Andrews	Fr
WR	83	Nick Basquine	Fr
WR	84	Grant Bothun	Jr
WR	87	Ryan Augello	Fr
WR	88	Cody Chancellor	So
TE	88	Taylor McNamara	So
TE	89	Connor Knight	So

Defense

Pos.	#	Name	Class
LB	1	Dominique Alexander	So
DB	2	Julian Wilson (C)	Sr
DB	3	Tito Windham	Fr
DB	4	Hatari Byrd	So
DB	6	Stanvon Taylor	So
LB	9	Tay Evans	Fr
DB	10	Quentin Hayes	Sr
DB	11	Steven Parker	Fr
DB	13	Ahmad Thomas	So
DB	14	Marcus Green	Fr
DB	15	Zack Sanchez	So
LB	18	Curtis Bolton	Fr
LB	19	Eric Striker (C)	Jr
LB	20	Frank Shannon	Jr
DB	22	Cortez Johnson	Jr
LB	23	Devante Bond	Jr
DB	23	Vontre McQuinnie	Fr
DB	24	Brandon Young	Sr
LB	25	Aaron Franklin	Sr
LB	26	Jordan Evans	So
DB	27	Dakota Austin	So
DB	29	Dylan Briggs	Fr
DE	29	Rashod Favors	Sr
DB	30	Jordan Thomas	Fr
DB	30	Thaddeus LaGrone	So
LB	31	Londell Taylor	Jr
DB	32	Joshua Bennett	Fr
DB	36	Caden Sander	Fr
DB	37	Brandon Kitchens	So
DB	38	Najee Bissoon	Fr
DB	39	Abdul Eissa	Sr
LB	40	P. L. Lindley	Jr
DB	41	Brian Walker	Fr
LB	42	Ruben Hunter	So
LB	43	Cameron Cotton	Fr
LB	45	Caleb Gastelum	Sr
DE	49	David Driskill	Sr
DT	50	Courtney Garnett	Fr
LB	51	Cade Parker	Fr
DT	58	Chase Frazier	Fr
DT	59	Kane Snowden	So
DT	80	Jordan Phillips	So
LB	82	Ogbonnia Okoronkwo	Fr
DE	84	Mike Onuoha	So
DE	85	Geneo Grissom	Sr
DE	87	D. J. Ward	Fr
DE	90	Matt Dimon	So
DE	91	Charles Tapper	Jr
DT	92	Matthew Romar	Fr
DT	93	Jordan Wade	So
DT	94	Torrea Peterson	Sr
DT	95	Quincy Russell	Sr
DE	96	Mitch Tate	Jr
DT	97	Charles Walker	Fr
DT	98	Chuka Ndulue (C)	Sr
DE	99	Dwayne Orso	Fr

Special teams

Pos.	#	Name	Class
K	18	Michael Hunnicutt (C)	Sr
P	38	Jack Steed	So
K	39	Nick Hodgson	Sr
LS	42	Wesley Horky	Fr
P	44	Jed Barnett	Sr
K	46	Jack Braught	So
K	47	Eric Hosek	Jr

Head coach

- Bob Stoops (16th season)

Coordinators/assistant coaches

- Josh Heupel – Co-offensive coordinator / quarterbacks
- Jay Norvell – Co-offensive coordinator / wide receivers
- Cale Gundy – Running backs / Director of Recruiting
- Bill Bedenbaugh – Offensive line
- Jay Boulware – Tight ends / special teams coordinator
- Mike Stoops – Associate head coach, Defensive coordinator, Safeties
- Tim Kish – Assistant Defensive coordinator / Linebackers
- Bobby Jack Wright – Assistant Head Coach / Cornerbacks
- Jerry Montgomery – Defensive line
- Jerry Schmidt – Director of Sports Enhancement
- Matt McMillen – Assistant A.D. Football Operations
- Merv Johnson – Director of football operations
- Austin Woods – Offensive quality control
- C. J. Ah You – Special Teams Quality Control
- Chad Walker – Defensive quality control
- Ryan Allgood – Offensive Graduate Assistant
- Joey Halzle – Offensive Graduate Assistant
- Corey Callens – Defensive Graduate Assistant
- Courtney Viney – Defensive Graduate Assistant

Legend

- (C) Team captain
- (S) Suspended
- (I) Ineligible
- Injured
- Redshirt

Roster
Last update: September 1, 2014

== Depth chart ==
Defense

FS
Ahmad Thomas
Hatari Byrd or
Steven Parker

ROLB	RILB	LILB	LOLB
Geneo Grissom	Dominique Alexander	Jordan Evans	Eric Striker
Devante Bond or	Aaron Franklin	Caleb Gastelum	P. L. Lindley
Ogbonnia Okoronkwo	⋅	⋅	⋅

SS
Quentin Hayes
Steven Parker
⋅

CB
Zack Sanchez
Dakota Austin
Stanvon Taylor

DE	NT	DE
Chuka Ndulue	Jordan Phillips	Charles Tapper
Charles Walker	Matthew Romar	Matt Dimon
D. J. Ward	Torrea Peterson	Torrea Peterson

CB
Julian Wilson
Jordan Thomas
Marcus Green

Offense

WR
Sterling Shepard/
Durron Neal
K.J. Young
Jordan Smallwood/
Austin Bennett

LT	LG	C	RG	RT
Tyrus Thompson	Adam Shead	Ty Darlington	Dionte Savage or	Daryl Willams
Josiah St. John	Dionte Savage	Nila Kasitati	Nila Kasitati	Derek Farniok
Christian Daimler	⋅	Jonathan Alvarez	Tyler Evans	⋅

TE
Blake Bell
Taylor McNamara
Sam Grant

WR
Michiah Quick
K.J. Young
Austin Bennett

QB
Trevor Knight
Cody Thomas
Justice Hansen

RB
Samaje Perine or
Alex Ross or
Keith Ford

FB
Aaron Ripkowski
Dimitri Flowers
⋅

Special teams
PK Michael Hunnicutt
P Jed Barnett
Jack Steed
KR Alex Ross
Durron Neal
Michiah Quick
PR Sterling Shepard
Michiah Quick
Zack Sanchez
LS Connor Knight (PAT/FG)
Wesley Horky (Punts)
H Grant Bothun
Jack Steed or
Jed Barnett

== Game summaries ==
=== Louisiana Tech ===
Louisiana Tech Bulldogs at #4 Oklahoma Sooners – Game summary

Quarter	1	2	3	4	Total
Louisiana Tech	0	3	0	13	16
#4 Oklahoma	21	10	10	7	48

at Gaylord Family Oklahoma Memorial Stadium • Norman, Oklahoma

- Date: August 30, 2014
- Game time: 6:00 p.m. CDT
- Game weather: Temperature: 93 °F (34 °C) • Wind: ENE 5 • Weather: Clear
- Game attendance: 85,063
- Referee: Referee: Dan Romeo • Umpire: Scott Teifer • Linesman: Rick Smith • Line judge: Marc Bovos • Back judge: Chris Alston • Field judge: Bobby Benard • Side judge: Craig Falkner
- TV announcers (FSOK PPV): Ron Thulin (Play-by-play), Dave Lapham (Color) & Chad McKee (Sideline)

Game information

First Quarter

- OU – 10:22 Keith Ford 22 yd run, Michael Hunnicutt XP good (OU 7–0)
- OU – 06:18 Sterling Shepard 16 yd pass from Trevor Knight, Michael Hunnicutt XP good (OU 14–0)
- OU – 00:33 Keith Ford 5 yd run, Michael Hunnicutt XP good (OU 21–0)

Second Quarter

- OU – 12:24 Michael Hunnicutt 39 yd field goal (OU 24–0)
- OU – 02:19 Alex Ross 1 yd run, Michael Hunnicutt XP good (OU 31–0)
- LT – 00:00 Jonathan Barnes 36 yd field goal (OU 31–3)

Third Quarter

- OU – 13:31 Alex Ross 8 yd run, Michael Hunnicutt XP good (OU 38–3)
- OU – 09:41 Michael Hunnicutt 37 yd field goal (OU 41–3)

Fourth Quarter

- LT – 14:49 Kenneth Dixon 6 yd pass from Cody Sokol, Jonathan Barnes XP good (OU 41–10)
- OU – 14:00 Samaje Perine 7 yd run, Michael Hunnicutt XP good (OU 48–10)
- LT – 14:49 Trent Taylor 22 yd pass from Cody Sokol, Jonathan Barnes XP blocked (OU 48–16)

Top Passers

- LT – Cody Sokol 22/36, 191 yards, 2 TD, 1 INT
- OU – Trevor Knight 19/34, 253 yards, 1 TD, 1 INT

Top Rushers

- LT – Kenneth Dixon 16 attempts, 42 yards
- OU – Samaje Perine 13 attempts, 77 yards, 1 TD

Top Receiving

- LT – Sterling Griffin 7 receptions, 74 yards
- OU – Keith Ford 4 receptions, 65 yards

Top Tacklers

- LT – Kentrell Brice 9 tackles
- OU – Aaron Franklin 6 tackles

=== Tulsa ===
#4 Oklahoma Sooners at Tulsa Golden Hurricane – Game summary

Quarter	1	2	3	4	Total
#4 Oklahoma	21	10	14	7	52
Tulsa	0	0	7	0	7

at Chapman Stadium • Tulsa, Oklahoma

- Date: September 6, 2014
- Game time: 11:05 a.m. CDT
- Game weather: Temperature: 65 °F (18 °C) • Wind: N 9 • Weather: Light Rain
- Game attendance: 29,357
- Referee: Referee: Reggie Smith • Umpire: Michael Cooper • Linesman: Mike Moeller • Line judge: Greg Reid • Back judge: Lyndon Nixon • Field judge: Matt Mills • Side judge: Tim Murray
- TV announcers (ABC/ESPN2): Sean McDonough (Play-by-play), Chris Spielman (Color) & Todd McShay (Sideline)

Game information

First Quarter

- OU – 14:03 Keith Ford 7 yd run, Michael Hunnicutt XP good (OU 7–0)
- OU – 06:35 Trevor Knight 31 yd run, Michael Hunnicutt XP good (OU 14–0)
- OU – 01:58 Blake Bell 3 yd pass from Trevor Knight, Michael Hunnicutt XP good (OU 21–0)

Second Quarter

- OU – 12:04 Michael Hunnicutt 38 yd field goal (OU 24–0)
- OU – 06:13 Alex Ross 82 yd run, Michael Hunnicutt XP good (OU 31–0)

Third Quarter

- TUL – 11:42 Keevan Lucas 4 yd pass from Dane Evans, Carl Salazar XP good (OU 31–7)
- OU – 09:32 Keith Ford 23 yd run, Michael Hunnicutt XP good (OU 38–7)
- OU – 08:32 Genoe Grissom 38 yd interception return, Michael Hunnicutt XP good (OU 45–7)

Fourth Quarter

- OU – 14:56 Sterling Shepard 15 yd pass from Trevor Knight, Michael Hunnicutt XP good (OU 52–7)

Top Passers

- OU – Trevor Knight 21/34, 299 yards, 2 TD
- TUL – Dane Evans 23/43, 204 yards, 1 TD, 2 INT

Top Rushers

- OU – Alex Ross 5 attempts, 90 yards, 1 TD
- TUL – James Flanders 13 attempts, 54 yards

Top Receiving

- OU – Sterling Shepard 8 receptions, 177 yards, 1 TD
- TUL – Keevan Lucas 10 receptions, 84 yards, 1 TD

Top Tacklers

- OU – Eric Striker 8 tackles
- TUL – Trent Martin 9 tackles

=== Tennessee ===
Tennessee Volunteers at #4 Oklahoma Sooners – Game summary

Quarter	1	2	3	4	Total
Tennessee	0	7	3	0	10
#4 Oklahoma	13	7	7	7	34

at Gaylord Family Oklahoma Stadium • Norman, Oklahoma

- Date: September 13, 2014
- Game time: 7:14 p.m. CDT
- Game weather: Temperature: 63 °F (17 °C) • Wind: ESE 7 • Weather: Partly Cloudy
- Game attendance: 85,622
- Referee: Referee: Matt Moore • Umpire: Tom Quick • Linesman: Gary Jayroe • Line judge: David Oliver • Back judge: Grantis Bell • Field judge: Phillip Davenpo • Side judge: Chris Conley
- TV announcers (ABC): Chris Fowler (Play-by-play), Kirk Herbstreit (Color) & Heather Cox (Sideline)

Game information

First Quarter

- OU – 09:48 Michael Hunnicutt 29 yd field goal (OU 3–0)
- OU – 05:52 Keith Ford 23 yd pass from Trevor Knight, Michael Hunnicutt XP good (OU 10–0)
- OU – 00:04 Michael Hunnicutt 27 yd field goal (OU 13–0)

Second Quarter

- UT – 09:46 Josh Smith 40 yd pass from Justin Worley, Aaron Medley XP good (OU 13–7)
- OU – 01:33 Keith Ford 11 yd run, Michael Hunnicutt XP good (OU 20–7)

Third Quarter

- OU – 12:25 Trevor Knight 5 yd run, Michael Hunnicutt XP good (OU 27–7)
- UT – 02:29 Aaron Medley 31 yd field goal (OU 27–10)

Fourth Quarter

- OU – 10:57 Julian Wilson 100 yd interception return, Michael Hunnicutt XP good (OU 34–10)

Top Passers

- UT – Justin Worley 21/44, 201 yards, 1 TD, 2 INT
- OU – Trevor Knight 20/33, 308 yards, 1 TD, 1 INT

Top Rushers

- UT – Jalen Hurd 14 attempts, 97 yards
- OU – Samaje Perine 9 attempts, 67 yards

Top Receiving

- UT – Marquez North 6 receptions, 67 yards
- OU – Sterling Shepard 5 receptions, 109 yards

Top Tacklers

- UT – A. J. Johnson 11 tackles
- OU – Dominique Alexander 12 tackles

=== West Virginia ===
#4 Oklahoma Sooners at West Virginia Mountaineers – Game summary

Quarter	1	2	3	4	Total
#4 Oklahoma	3	21	14	7	45
West Virginia	7	17	3	6	33

at Mountaineer Field • Morgantown, West Virginia

- Date: September 20, 2014
- Game time: 7:35 p.m. EDT
- Game weather: Temperature: 78 °F (26 °C) • Wind: SSW 7 • Weather: Clear
- Game attendance: 61,908
- Referee: Referee: Dan Romeo • Umpire: Scott Teifer • Linesman: Rick Smith • Line judge: Marc Bovos • Back judge: Chris Alston • Field judge: Bobby Benard • Side judge: Craig Falkner
- TV announcers (FOX): Gus Johnson (Play-by-play), Charles Davis (Color) & Molly McGrath (Sideline)

Game information

First Quarter

- OU – 04:20 Michael Hunnicutt 42 yd field goal (OU 3–0)
- WVU – 00:39 Kevin White 68 yd pass from Clint Trickett, Josh Lambert XP good (WVU 7–3)

Second Quarter

- WVU – 11:00 Josh Lambert 54 yd field goal (WVU 10–3)
- OU – 08:58 Trevor Knight 4 yd pass from Durron Neal, Michael Hunnicutt XP good (Tied 10–10)
- WVU – 07:45 Mario Alford 30 yd pass from Clint Trickett, Josh Lambert XP good (WVU 17–10)
- OU – 03:09 Samaje Perine 2 yd run, Michael Hunnicutt XP good (Tied 17–17)
- WVU – 01:20 Rushel Shell 5 yd run, Josh Lambert XP good (WVU 24–17)
- OU – 01:08 Alex Ross 100 yd kickoff return, Michael Hunnicutt XP good (Tied 24–24)

Third Quarter

- OU – 12:22 Samaje Perine 9 yd run, Michael Hunnicutt XP good (OU 31–24)
- WVU – 06:28 Josh Lambert 31 yd field goal (OU 31–27)
- OU – 01:00 Samaje Perine 5 yd run, Michael Hunnicutt XP good (OU 38–27)

Fourth Quarter

- OU – 04:30 Samaje Perine 19 yd run, Michael Hunnicutt XP good (OU 45–27)
- WVU – 02:12 Dreamius Smith 11 yd run, Clint Trickett pass failed (OU 45–33)

Top Passers

- OU – Trevor Knight 16/29, 205 yards, 1 INT
- WVU – Clint Trickett 25/41, 376 yards, 2 TD, 2 INT

Top Rushers

- OU – Samaje Perine 34 attempts, 242 yards, 4 TD
- WVU – Rushel Shell 15 attempts, 60 yards, 1 TD

Top Receiving

- OU – Sterling Shepard 6 receptions, 101 yards
- WVU – Kevin White 10 receptions, 173 yards, 1 TD

Top Tacklers

- OU – Jordan Evans 11 tackles
- WVU – Karl Joseph 13 tackles

=== TCU ===
#4 Oklahoma Sooners at #25 TCU Horned Frogs – Game summary

Quarter	1	2	3	4	Total
#4 Oklahoma	14	10	7	2	33
#25 TCU	14	10	7	6	37

at Amon G. Carter Stadium • Fort Worth, Texas

- Date: October 4, 2014
- Game time: 2:35 p.m. CDT
- Game weather: Temperature: 78 °F (26 °C) • Wind: SE 7 • Weather: Sunny and Clear
- Game attendance: 47,394
- Referee: Referee: Mike Defee • Umpire: Robert Richeson • Linesman: Al Green • Line judge: Walt Coleman IV • Back judge: Terry White • Field judge: Nick Lave • Side judge: Shane Standley
- TV announcers (FOX): Gus Johnson (Play-by-play), Charles Davis (Color) & Molly McGrath (Sideline)

Game information

First Quarter

- TCU – 10:09 Cliff Murphy 0 yd fumble recovery, Jaden Oberkrom XP good (TCU 7–0)
- TCU – 05:52 B. J. Catalon 7 yd run, Jaden Oberkrom XP good (TCU 14–0)
- OU – 03:56 Samaje Perine 1 yd run, Michael Hunnicutt XP good (TCU 14–7)
- OU – 00:33 Sterling Shepard 75 yd pass from Trevor Knight, Michael Hunnicutt XP good (Tied 14–14)

Second Quarter

- TCU – 12:06 B. J. Catalon 39 yd pass from Trevone Boykin, Jaden Oberkrom XP good (TCU 21–14)
- OU – 05:33 Samaje Perine 1 yd run, Michael Hunnicutt XP good (Tied 21–21)
- TCU – 01:39 Jaden Oberkrom 31 yd field goal (TCU 24–21)
- OU – 00:00 Michael Hunnicutt 32 yd field goal (Tied 24–24)

Third Quarter

- OU – 09:28 Samaje Perine 7 yd run, Michael Hunnicutt XP good (OU 31–24)
- TCU – 06:48 Deante' Gray 29 yd pass from Trevone Boykin, Jaden Oberkrom XP good (Tied 31–31)

Fourth Quarter

- TCU – 14:12 Paul Dawson 31 yd interception return, Jaden Oberkrom XP blocked (TCU 37–31)
- OU – 14:12 Zack Sanchez PAT return (TCU 37–33)

Top Passers

- OU – Trevor Knight 14/35, 309 yards, 1 TD, 2 INT
- TCU – Trevone Boykin 20/38, 318 yards, 2 TD, 1 INT

Top Rushers

- OU – Samaje Perine 25 attempts, 87 yards, 3 TD
- TCU – Trevone Boykin 22 attempts, 77 yards

Top Receiving

- OU – Sterling Shepard 7 receptions, 215 yards, 1 TD
- TCU – Kolby Listenbee 5 receptions, 103 yards

Top Tacklers

- OU – Jordan Evans 10 tackles
- TCU – Chris Hackett 13 tackles

=== Texas (Red River Showdown) ===
Texas Longhorns vs. #11 Oklahoma Sooners – Game summary

Quarter	1	2	3	4	Total
Texas	3	10	0	13	26
#11 Oklahoma	7	10	7	7	31

at Cotton Bowl • Dallas

- Date: October 11, 2014
- Game time: 11:00 a.m. CDT
- Game weather: Temperature: 58 °F (14 °C) • Wind: NW 11 • Weather: Cloudy
- Game attendance: 92,100
- Referee: Referee: Alan Eck • Umpire: Tab Slaughter • Linesman: Doug Moore • Line judge: Kevin Vicknair • Back judge: Brad Van Vark • Field judge: Scott Gaines • Side judge: Anthony Fleming
- TV announcers (ABC): Sean McDonough (Play-by-play), Chris Spielman (Color) & Todd McShay (Sideline)

Game information

First Quarter

- TEX – 08:16 Nick Rose 28 yd field goal (TEX 3–0)
- OU – 08:04 Alex Ross 91 yd kickoff return, Michael Hunnicutt XP good (OU 7–3)

Second Quarter

- OU – 13:19 Michael Hunnicutt 44 yd field goal (OU 10–3)
- OU – 11:18 Zack Sanchez 43 yd interception return, Michael Hunnicutt XP good (OU 17–3)
- TEX – 08:17 John Harris 38 yd pass from Tyrone Swoopes, Nick Rose XP good (OU 17–10)
- TEX – 00:48 Nick Rose 20 yd field goal (OU 17–13)

Third Quarter

- OU – 04:17 Sterling Shepard 24 yd pass from Trevor Knight, Michael Hunnicutt XP good (OU 24–13)

Fourth Quarter

- OU – 12:50 Samaje Perine 13 yd run, Michael Hunnicutt XP good (OU 31–13)
- TEX – 08:24 John Harris 6 yd pass from Tyrone Swoopes, Nick Rose XP good (OU 31–20)
- TEX – 04:57 Tyrone Swoopes 12 yd run, Tyrone Swoopes rush failed (OU 31–26)

Top Passers

- TEX – Tyrone Swoopes 27/44, 334 yards, 2 TD, 1 INT
- OU – Trevor Knight 12/20, 129 yards, 1 TD

Top Rushers

- TEX – Malcom Brown 19 attempts, 78 yards
- OU – Samaje Perine 18 attempts, 62 yards, 1 TD

Top Receiving

- TEX – Jaxon Shipley 9 receptions, 115 yards
- OU – Sterling Shepard 4 receptions, 63 yards, 1 TD

Top Tacklers

- TEX – Jordan Hicks 10 tackles
- OU – Jordan Evans 14 tackles

=== Kansas State ===
#14 Kansas State Wildcats at #11 Oklahoma Sooners – Game summary

Quarter	1	2	3	4	Total
#14 Kansas State	7	14	10	0	31
#11 Oklahoma	7	10	7	6	30

at Gaylord Family Oklahoma Memorial Stadium • Norman, Oklahoma

- Date: October 18, 2014
- Game time: 11:00 a.m. CDT
- Game weather: Temperature: 62 °F (17 °C) • Wind: NE 12 • Weather: Partly Cloudy
- Game attendance: 85,019
- Referee: Referee: Reggie Smith • Umpire: Michael Cooper • Linesman: Mike Moeller • Line judge: Mark Steward • Back judge: Lyndon Nixon • Field judge: Matt Mills • Side judge: Tim Murray
- TV announcers (ESPN): Dave Pasch (Play-by-play), Brian Griese (Color) & Tom Luginbill (Sideline)

Game information

First Quarter

- OU – 04:58 Samaje Perine 2 yd run, Michael Hunnicutt XP good (OU 7–0)
- KSU – 04:01 Glen Gronkowski 62 yd pass from Jake Waters, Matthew McCrane XP good (Tied 7–7)

Second Quarter

- KSU – 14:04 Danzel McDaniel 5 yd interception return, Matthew McCrane XP good (KSU 14–7)
- OU – 13:36 Sterling Shepard 47 yd pass from Trevor Knight, Michael Hunnicutt XP good (Tied 14–14)
- KSU – 09:33 Tyler Lockett 9 yd pass from Jake Waters, Matthew McCrane XP good (KSU 21–14)
- OU – 04:24 Michael Hunnicutt 38 yd field goal (KSU 21–17)

Third Quarter

- KSU – 11:48 Matthew McCrane 27 yd field goal (KSU 24–17)
- OU – 09:32 Blake Bell 4 yd pass from Trevor Knight, Michael Hunnicutt XP good (Tied 24–24)
- KSU – 06:57 Jake Waters 4 yd run, Matthew McCrane XP good (KSU 31–24)

Fourth Quarter

- OU – 10:35 Durron Neal 9 yd pass from Trevor Knight, Michael Hunnicutt XP blocked (KSU 31–30)

Top Passers

- KSU – Jake Waters 15/23, 225 yards, 2 TD
- OU – Trevor Knight 26/32, 318 yards, 3 TD, 1 INT

Top Rushers

- KSU – DeMarcus Robinson 8 attempts, 66 yards
- OU – Samaje Perine 24 attempts, 89 yards, 1 TD

Top Receiving

- KSU – Tyler Lockett 6 receptions, 86 yards, 1 TD
- OU – Sterling Shepard 15 receptions, 197 yards, 1 TD

Top Tacklers

- KSU – Jonathan Truman 17 tackles
- OU – Jordan Evans 7 tackles

=== Iowa State ===
#19 Oklahoma Sooners at Iowa State Cyclones – Game summary

Quarter	1	2	3	4	Total
#19 Oklahoma	21	14	17	7	59
Iowa State	0	7	7	0	14

at Jack Trice Stadium • Ames, Iowa

- Date: November 1, 2014
- Game time: 11:05 a.m. CDT
- Game weather: Temperature: 34 °F (1 °C) • Wind: SSE 5 • Weather: Partly Cloudy
- Game attendance: 50,784
- Referee: Referee: Randy Christal • Umpire: Jim Adams • Linesman: Cal McNeill • Line judge: Kelly Deterding • Back judge: Terry Jones • Field judge: Joe Blubaugh • Side judge: Freeman Johns
- TV announcers (FS1): Craig Bolerjack (Play-by-play) & Ryan Nece (Color)

Game information

First Quarter

- OU – 13:38 Trevor Knight 31 yd run, Michael Hunnicutt XP good (OU 7–0)
- OU – 09:52 K. J. Young 16 yd pass from Trevor Knight, Michael Hunnicutt XP good (OU 14–0)
- OU – 02:42 Blake Bell 5 yd pass from Trevor Knight, Michael Hunnicutt XP good (OU 21–0)

Second Quarter

- ISU – 14:18 Sam B. Richardson 18 yd run, Cole Netten XP good (OU 21–7)
- OU – 06:44 Samaje Perine 7 yd run, Michael Hunnicutt XP good (OU 28–7)
- OU – 04:03 Trevor Knight 8 yd run, Michael Hunnicutt XP good (OU 35–7)

Third Quarter

- OU – 11:20 Michael Hunnicutt 44 yd field goal (OU 38–7)
- OU – 06:43 Blake Bell 17 yd pass from Trevor Knight, Michael Hunnicutt XP good (OU 45–7)
- ISU – 06:14 D'Vario Montgomery 59 yd pass from Sam B. Richardson, Cole Netten XP good (OU 45–14)
- OU – 02:55 Trevor Knight 9 yd run, Michael Hunnicutt XP good (OU 52–14)

Fourth Quarter

- OU – 05:12 David Smith 8 yd run, Michael Hunnicutt XP good (OU 59–14)

Top Passers

- OU – Trevor Knight 22/35, 230 yards, 3 TD, 2 INT
- ISU – Sam B. Richardson 15/40, 239 yards, 1 TD

Top Rushers

- OU – Trevor Knight 16 attempts, 146 yards, 3 TD
- ISU – Tyler Brown 8 attempts, 48 yards

Top Receiving

- OU – Durron Neal 5 receptions, 60 yards
- ISU – D'Vario Montgomery 3 receptions, 88 yards, 1 TD

Top Tacklers

- OU – Dominique Alexander 7 tackles
- ISU – Kenneth Lynn 10 tackles

=== Baylor ===
#10 Baylor Bears at #16 Oklahoma Sooners – Game summary

Quarter	1	2	3	4	Total
#10 Baylor	3	21	14	10	48
#16 Oklahoma	14	0	0	0	14

at Gaylord Family Oklahoma Memorial Stadium • Norman, Oklahoma

- Date: November 8, 2014
- Game time: 11:06 a.m. CST
- Game weather: Temperature: 57 °F (14 °C) • Wind: N 22 • Weather: Sunny
- Game attendance: 85,048
- Referee: Referee: Greg Burks • Umpire: Scott Campbell • Linesman: George Gusman • Line judge: Walt Coleman IV • Back judge: Brian Ernest • Field judge: Randy Smith • Side judge: Gene Semko
- TV announcers (FS1): Joe Davis (Play-by-play), Joey Harrington (Color) & Kris Budden (Sideline)

Game information

First Quarter

- BAY – 08:20 Chris Callahan 34 yd field goal (BAY 3–0)
- OU – 05:07 Micah Quick 8 yd pass from Trevor Knight, Michael Hunnicutt XP good (OU 7–3)
- OU – 00:37 Durron Neal 9 yd pass from Trevor Knight, Michael Hunnicutt XP good (OU 14–3)

Second Quarter

- BAY – 12:56 Corey Coleman 33 yd pass from Bryce Petty, Chris Callahan XP good (OU 14–10)
- BAY – 10:50 Devin Chafin 1 yd run, Chris Callahan XP good (BAY 17–14)
- BAY – 03:38 Devin Chafin 2 yd run, Chris Callahan XP good (BAY 24–14)

Third Quarter

- BAY – 12:10 Corey Coleman 5 yd run, Chris Callahan XP good (BAY 31–14)
- BAY – 08:18 Shock Linwood 3 yd run, Chris Callahan XP good (BAY 38–14)

Fourth Quarter

- BAY – 12:38 Chris Callahan 24 yd field goal (BAY 41–14)
- BAY – 07:37 Shock Linwood 15 yd run, Chris Callahan XP good (BAY 48–14)

Top Passers

- BAY – Bryce Petty 32/42, 387 yards, 1 TD
- OU – Trevor Knight 12/27, 146 yards, 2 TD, 1 INT

Top Rushers

- BAY – Shock Linwood 23 attempts, 87 yards, 2 TD
- OU – Alex Ross 6 attempts, 71 yards

Top Receiving

- BAY – Corey Coleman 15 receptions, 224 yards, 1 TD
- OU – Micah Quick 6 receptions, 94 yards, 1 TD

Top Tacklers

- BAY – Bryce Hager 9 tackles
- OU – Dominique Alexander 13 tackles

=== Texas Tech ===
Oklahoma Sooners at Texas Tech Red Raiders – Game summary

Quarter	1	2	3	4	Total
Oklahoma	0	7	14	21	42
Texas Tech	7	7	7	9	30

at Jones AT&T Stadium • Lubbock, Texas

- Date: November 15, 2014
- Game time: 2:35 p.m. CST
- Game weather: Temperature: 71 °F (22 °C) • Wind: W 19 • Weather: Clear
- Game attendance: 59,014
- Referee: Referee: Mike Defee • Umpire: Robert Richeson • Linesman: Al Green • Line judge: Walt Coleman IV • Back judge: Brad Van Vark • Field judge: Scott Gaines • Side judge: Freeman Johns • Scorer: Mike Aaronian
- TV announcers (ESPN): Bob Wischusen (Play-by-play), Matt Millen (Color) & Quint Kessenich (Sideline)

Game information

First Quarter

- TTU – 04:03 Jakeem Grant 6 yd pass from Patrick Mahomes, Ryan Bustin XP good (TTU 7–0)

Second Quarter

- OU – 04:41 Samaje Perine 2 yd run, Michael Hunnicutt XP good (Tied 7–7)
- TTU – 03:17 Ian Sadler 59 yd pass from Patrick Mahomes, Ryan Bustin XP good (TTU 14–7)

Third Quarter

- TTU – 13:35 Devin Lauderdale 47 yd pass from Patrick Mahomes, Ryan Bustin XP good (TTU 21–7)
- OU – 12:04 Samaje Perine 64 yd run, Michael Hunnicutt XP good (TTU 21–14)
- OU – 03:01 Durron Neal 3 yd pass from Cody Thomas, Michael Hunnicutt XP good (Tied 21–21)

Fourth Quarter

- TTU – 14:11 Ryan Bustin 27 yd field goal (TTU 24–21)
- OU – 10:06 Cody Thomas 4 yd run, Michael Hunnicutt XP good (OU 28–24)
- OU – 05:18 Aaron Ripkowski 1 yd run, Michael Hunnicutt XP good (OU 35–24)
- OU – 01:33 Samaje Perine 11 yd run, Michael Hunnicutt XP good (OU 42–24)
- TTU – 00:00 Dylan Cantrell 39 yd pass from Patrick Mahomes, no XP (OU 42–30)

Top Passers

- OU – Cody Thomas 10/20, 133 yards, 1 TD, 3 INT
- TTU – Patrick Mahomes 27/50, 393 yards, 4 TD

Top Rushers

- OU – Samaje Perine 25 attempts, 213 yards, 2 TD
- TTU – DeAndre Washington 12 attempts, 56 yards

Top Receiving

- OU – Durron Neal 4 receptions, 57 yards, 1 TD
- TTU – Ian Sadler 4 receptions, 89 yards, 1 TD

Top Tacklers

- OU – Jordan Evans 8 tackles
- TTU – Nigel Bethel 8 tackles

=== Kansas ===
Kansas Jayhawks at #23 Oklahoma Sooners – Game summary

Quarter	1	2	3	4	Total
Kansas	0	0	7	0	7
#23 Oklahoma	10	14	17	3	44

at Gaylord Family Oklahoma Memorial Stadium • Norman, Oklahoma

- Date: November 22, 2014
- Game time: 12:35 p.m. CST
- Game weather: Temperature: 54 °F (12 °C) • Wind: SSE 22 • Weather: Rain
- Game attendance: 84,908
- Referee: Referee: Dan Romeo • Umpire: Scott Teifer • Linesman: Cal McNeill • Line judge: Marc Bovos • Back judge: Chris Alston • Field judge: Ed Vinzant • Side judge: Craig Falkner
- TV announcers (FS1): Craig Bolerjack (Play-by-play) & Ryan Nece (Color)

Game information

First Quarter

- OU – 11:24 Samaje Perine 49 yd run, Michael Hunnicutt XP good (OU 7–0)
- OU – 02:46 Michael Hunnicutt 38 yd field goal (OU 10–0)

Second Quarter

- OU – 06:05 Samaje Perine 33 yd run, Michael Hunnicutt XP good (OU 17–0)
- OU – 01:41 Samaje Perine 34 yd run, Michael Hunnicutt XP good (OU 24–0)

Third Quarter

- OU – 13:56 Samaje Perine 66 yd run, Michael Hunnicutt XP good (OU 31–0)
- KU – 13:34 Cassius Sendish 63 yd fumble recovery, Matthew Wyman XP good (OU 31–7)
- OU – 09:30 Michael Hunnicutt 37 yd field goal (OU 34–7)
- OU – 06:04 Samaje Perine 27 yd run, Michael Hunnicutt XP good (OU 41–7)

Fourth Quarter

- OU – 08:02 Michael Hunnicutt 36 yd field goal (OU 44–7)

Top Passers

- KU – Michael Cummings 8/22, 94 yards, 1 INT
- OU – Cody Thomas 3/13, 39 yards

Top Rushers

- KU – Corey Avery 11 attempts, 38 yards
- OU – Samaje Perine 34 attempts, 427 yards, 5 TD

Top Receiving

- KU – Corey Avery 2 receptions, 32 yards
- OU – Samaje Perine 1 reception, 19 yards

Top Tacklers

- KU – Isaiah Johnson 12 tackles
- OU – Dominique Alexander 7 tackles

Kickoff was delayed from the original start time of 11:00 a.m. to 12:30 p.m. due to lightning and thunderstorms in the vicinity of the University of Oklahoma. Oklahoma true freshman running back Samaje Perine broke the NCAA single-game rushing record in this game, recording 427 yards and five touchdowns on 34 carries. Perine broke Wisconsin running back Melvin Gordon's record — which only stood for seven days — on a 42-yard run early in the fourth quarter. The yardage also allowed him to become OU's single-game leading rusher, breaking the mark previously owned by Greg Pruitt (294 yards vs. Kansas State, October 23, 1971). It was the third game of the season in which Perine rushed for more than 200 yards.

=== Oklahoma State (Bedlam Series) ===
Oklahoma State Cowboys at #18 Oklahoma Sooners – Game summary

Quarter	1	2	3	4	OT	Total
Oklahoma State	7	7	0	21	3	38
#18 Oklahoma	7	21	0	7	0	35

at Gaylord Family Oklahoma Memorial Stadium • Norman, Oklahoma

- Date: December 6, 2014
- Game time: 2:35 p.m. CST
- Game weather: Temperature: 43 °F (6 °C) • Wind: N 12 • Weather: Cloudy
- Game attendance: 85,312
- Referee: Referee: Alan Eck • Umpire: Tab Slaughter • Linesman: Cal McNeil • Line judge: Mark Stewart • Back judge: Brad Van Vark • Field judge: Scott Gaines • Side judge: Freeman Johns
- TV announcers (FS1): Joe Davis (Play-by-play), Joey Harrington (Color) & Kris Budden (Sideline)

Game information

First Quarter

- OU – 12:15 Samaje Perine 4 yd run, Michael Hunnicutt XP good (OU 7–0)
- OSU – 08:32 Desmond Roland 1 yd run, Ben Grogan XP good (Tied 7–7)

Second Quarter

- OU – 11:57 Aaron Ripkowski 1 yd run, Michael Hunnicutt XP good (OU 14–7)
- OSU – 09:24 Brandon Sheperd 39 yd pass from Mason Rudolph, Ben Grogan XP good (Tied 14–14)
- OU – 06:53 Samaje Perine 9 yd run, Michael Hunnicutt XP good (OU 21–14)
- OU – 03:09 Aaron Ripkowski 2 yd pass from Cody Thomas, Michael Hunnicutt XP good (OU 28–14)

Fourth Quarter

- OSU – 11:56 Desmond Roland 3 yd run, Ben Grogan XP good (OU 28–21)
- OU – 07:54 Aaron Ripkowski 1 yd run, Michael Hunnicutt XP good (OU 35–21)
- OSU – 04:51 Brandon Sheperd 43 yd pass from Mason Rudolph, Ben Grogan XP good (OU 35–28)
- OSU – 00:45 Tyreek Hill 92 yd punt return, Ben Grogan XP good (Tied 35–35)

Overtime

- OSU – 15:00 Ben Grogan 21 yd field goal (OSU 38–35)

Top Passers

- OSU – Mason Rudolph 19/35, 273 yards, 2 TD, 1 INT
- OU – Cody Thomas 10/17, 120 yards, 1 TD

Top Rushers

- OSU – Desmond Roland 18 attempts, 68 yards, 2 TD
- OU – Samaje Perine 26 attempts, 151 yards, 2 TD

Top Receiving

- OSU – Brandon Sheperd 7 receptions, 156 yards, 2 TD
- OU – Blake Bell 2 receptions, 59 yards

Top Tacklers

- OSU – Larry Stephens 14 tackles
- OU – Jordan Evans 9 tackles

=== Clemson (Russell Athletic Bowl) ===
Oklahoma Sooners vs. #18 Clemson Tigers – Game summary

Quarter	1	2	3	4	Total
Oklahoma	0	0	0	6	6
#18 Clemson	17	10	13	0	40

at Orlando Citrus Bowl Stadium • Orlando, Florida

- Date: December 27, 2014
- Game time: 4:35 p.m. CST
- Game weather: Temperature: 80 °F (27 °C) • Wind: W 8 • Weather: Partly Cloudy
- Game attendance: 40,071
- Referee: Referee: Matt Moore • Umpire: Tom Quick • Linesman: Gus Morris • Line judge: Michael Shirey • Back judge: Grantis Bell • Field judge: Greg Thomas • Side judge: Rob Skelton
- TV announcers (ESPN/ESPN Radio): Mike Patrick (Play-by-play), Ed Cunningham (Color), & Jeannine Edwards (Sideline)/Bill Rosinski (Play-by-play), David Norrie (Color), & Joe Schad (Sideline)

Game information

First Quarter

- CLEM – 13:26 Artavis Scott 65 yd pass from Colt Stoudt, Ammon Lakip XP good (CLEM 7–0)
- CLEM – 08:21 Ammon Lakip 34 yd field goal (CLEM 10–0)
- CLEM – 03:25 Ben Boulware 47 yd interception return, Ammon Lakip XP good (CLEM 17–0)

Second Quarter

- CLEM – 14:00 Ammon Lakip 49 yd field goal (CLEM 20–0)
- CLEM – 07:34 Mike Williams 26 yd pass from Colt Stoudt, Ammon Lakip XP good (CLEM 27–0)

Third Quarter

- CLEM – 09:24 Cole Stoudt 2 yd run, Ammon Lakip XP good (CLEM 34–0)
- CLEM – 01:42 Germone Hopper 24 yd pass from Colt Stoudt, Ammon Lakip XP blocked (CLEM 40–0)

Fourth Quarter

- OU – 06:57 Alex Ross 11 yd run, Michael Hunnicutt XP blocked (CLEM 40–6)

Top Passers

- OU – Trevor Knight 17/37, 103 yards, 3 INT
- CLEM – Cole Stoudt 26/36, 319 yards, 3 TD

Top Rushers

- OU – Samaje Perine 23 attempts, 134 yards,
- CLEM – Wayne Gallman 19 attempts, 55 yards

Top Receiving

- OU – Michiah Quick 7 receptions, 46 yards
- CLEM – Artavis Scott 8 receptions, 114 yards, 1 TD

Top Tacklers

- OU – Erik Striker 12 tackles
- CLEM – Korrin Wiggins 7 tackles

== Rankings ==
Ranking movements Legend: ██ Increase in ranking ██ Decrease in ranking — = Not ranked RV = Received votes ( ) = First-place votes
	Week																
Poll	Pre	1	2	3	4	5	6	7	8	9	10	11	12	13	14	15	Final
AP	4 (1)	4 (2)	4 (2)	4 (2)	4 (4)	4 (7)	11	11	17	19	16	RV	23	20	18	RV	RV
Coaches	3 (3)	3 (2)	3 (3)	4 (4)	3 (12)	3 (14)	9	11	18	20	16	24	22	18	16	24	RV
CFP	Not released									18	15	—	21	20	20	—	Not released

== Statistics ==
=== Team ===
	OU	Opp
Points per Game	36.4	25.9
First downs	293	264
Rushing	161	86
Passing	118	155
Penalty	14	23
Rushing Yardage	3,395	1,383
Rushing Attempts	557	458
Avg per Rush	6.1	3
Avg per Game	261.2	106.4
Passing Yardage	2,646	3,591
Avg per Game	203.5	276.2
Completions-Attempts	210-386 (54.4%)	287-510 (56.3%)
Total Offense	6,041	4,974
Total Plays	943	968
Avg per Play	6.4	5.1
Avg per Game	464.7	382.6
Fumbles-Lost	12-7	19-7

	OU	Opp
Punts-Yards	66-2,763 (41.9 avg)	89-3,489 (39.2 avg)
Punt returns-Total Yards	15-87 (5.8 avg)	17-181 (10.6 avg)
Kick returns-Total Yards	37-840 (22.7 avg)	26-554 (21.3 avg)
Onside Kicks	0-1 (0%)	0-0
Avg Time of Possession per Game	30:20	29:40
Penalties-Yards	70-648	77-614
Avg per Game	49.8	47.2
3rd Down Conversions	72/178 (40.4%)	82/214 (38.3%)
4th Down Conversions	9/15 (60%)	9/17 (52.9%)
Sacks By-Yards	32-204	9-58
Total TDs	62	43
Rushing	40	15
Passing	17	23
Fields Goals-Attempts	13-18 (72.2%)	14-18 (77.8%)
PAT-Attempts	60-62 (96.8%)	37-40 (92.5%)
Total Attendance	510,972	248,457
Games-Avg per Game	6-85,162	5-49,691

- Most points given up in Stoops era
- Least sacks allowed since 2004
- Smallest average margin of victory (10.5), least passing touchdowns and lowest passing completion percentage since 2005
- Least rushing yards per game given up since 2006
- Least passing completions and third down conversions since 2006
- Highest passing completion percentage allowed since 2007
- Least field goals made and attempted since 2008
- Most rushing touchdowns since 2008
- Most first downs, total touchdowns and passing completions given up since 2008
- Least rushing first downs, rushing yards and yards per rush given up since 2009
- Highest fourth down conversion rate allowed since 2009
- Lowest field goal conversion rate since 2009

=== Scores by quarter ===
	1	2	3	4	OT	Total
Opponents	65	113	78	78	3	337
Oklahoma	138	134	114	87	0	473

- Most second quarter points allowed since 2008
- Least second quarter points scored since 2009

== Postseason ==
=== Coaching changes ===
- On January 4, 2015, co-offensive coordinator and receivers coach Jay Norvell was fired.
- On January 6, 2015, co-offensive coordinator and quarterbacks coach Josh Heupel was fired.
- On January 12, 2015, assistant head coach and cornerbacks coach Bobby Jack Wright announced his retirement from coaching.
- On January 12, 2015, East Carolina offensive coordinator Lincoln Riley was hired as Oklahoma offensive coordinator and quarterbacks coach.
- On February 4, 2015, Washington State wide receivers coach Dennis Simmons was hired as Oklahoma outside receivers coach.
- On February 9, 2015, Notre Dame defensive backs coach Kerry Cooks was hired as Oklahoma defensive backs coach.
- On February 10, 2015, defensive line coach Jerry Montgomery left Oklahoma to become a defensive front assistant for the Green Bay Packers.
- On February 19, 2015, Stanford defensive assistant Diron Reynolds was hired as defensive line coach.

=== 2015 NFL draft ===
The 2015 NFL draft was held at Auditorium Theatre in Chicago on April 30 through May 2, 2015. The following Oklahoma players were either selected or signed as free agents following the draft.

Player	Position	Round	Overall Pick	NFL team
Jordan Phillips	NT	2nd	52	Miami Dolphins
Geneo Grissom	DE	3rd	97	New England Patriots
Daryl Williams	OT	4th	102	Carolina Panthers
Blake Bell	TE	4th	117	San Francisco 49ers
Tyrus Thompson	OT	6th	185	Minnesota Vikings
Aaron Ripkowski	FB	6th	206	Green Bay Packers
Julian Wilson	CB	Undrafted		Baltimore Ravens
Chuka Ndulue	NT	Undrafted		Denver Broncos
Dionte Savage	G	Undrafted		Miami Dolphins
