= Brandon Streeter =

American football player and coach (born 1977)

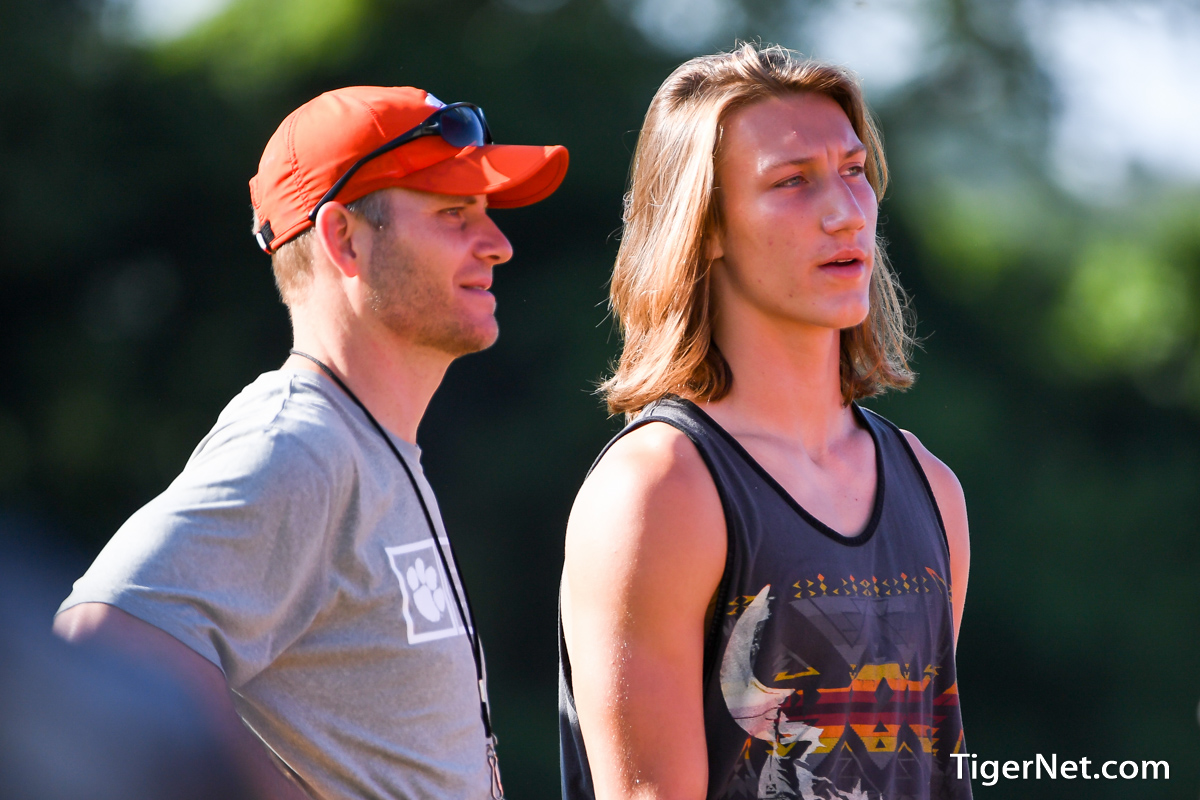
- Streeter (left) and Trevor Lawrence

Current position
- Title: Quarterbacks coach
- Team: Georgia
- Conference: SEC

Biographical details
- Born: January 1, 1977 (age 49); Gettysburg, Pennsylvania, U.S.

Playing career
- 1995–1999: Clemson
- 2001: Carolina Cobras
- Position: Quarterback

Coaching career (HC unless noted)
- 2002: Charleston Southern (QB)
- 2003: Charleston Southern (RB/RC)
- 2004–2005: Clemson (GA)
- 2006–2008: Liberty (QB)
- 2009–2011: Liberty (OC/QB)
- 2012–2014: Richmond (OC/QB)
- 2015–2019: Clemson (QB/RC)
- 2020–2021: Clemson (PGC/QB)
- 2022: Clemson (OC/QB)
- 2023–2025: Georgia (OA)
- 2026–Present: Georgia (QB)

Brandon Streeter (born January 1, 1977) is an American football coach and former player who is the quarterbacks coach at the University of Georgia. He previously served as the offensive coordinator and quarterbacks coach at Clemson University. He had previously served as an assistant coach at the University of Richmond, Liberty University and Charleston Southern University.

Streeter played college football at Clemson University as a quarterback from 1995 to 1999 and has been an assistant coach at Clemson since 2015, having served as quarterbacks coach and recruiting coordinator from 2015 to 2019 and passing game coordinator and quarterbacks coach from 2020 to 2021.

== Playing career ==
Streeter was a two-year starter at quarterback for Gettysburg Area High School, where he threw for more than 4,000 yards in his career and led the Warriors to two appearances in the district championship game. He was named to the 1995 Big 33 Football Classic all-star game. He played at Clemson from 1996 to 1999. He started the final two seasons of his college career, scoring the only touchdown in the Tigers appearance in the 1999 Peach Bowl.

== Coaching career ==
=== Early career ===
After playing one season with the Carolina Cobras, Streeter accepted a position at Charleston Southern as the team's quarterbacks coach in 2002, shifting over to the running backs coach and recruiting coordinator in 2003. He spent 2004 and 2005 at his alma mater Clemson as a graduate assistant. Streeter was named the quarterbacks coach at Liberty University in 2006, joining Danny Rocco's inaugural staff. He was promoted to offensive coordinator in 2009.

=== Richmond ===
After Rocco was named the head coach at Richmond in December 2011, Streeter joined Rocco's staff as the offensive coordinator and quarterbacks coach. During his time as the Spiders offensive coordinator, the Spiders put up 28 points per game in 2011, 33 in 2012, and 31 in 2013.

=== Clemson (second stint) ===
In 2014, Streeter was named the quarterbacks coach and recruiting coordinator at Clemson University, replacing Chad Morris as the position coach and Jeff Scott as the recruiting coordinator, the latter being one of Morris' successors as offensive coordinator. His first appearance as quarterbacks coach was in the Russell Athletic Bowl, where Clemson quarterback Cole Stoudt threw for a season high 319 yards and three passing touchdowns, one rushing touchdown, and the game's MVP in a 40–6 victory over Oklahoma.

During Streeter's time as recruiting coordinator, Clemson's recruiting classes were consistently ranked in the top 25 by recruiting websites 247Sports and Rivals, while also getting commitments from top quarterback prospects Trevor Lawrence and DJ Uiagalelei.

Following Scott's departure to accept the head coaching position at South Florida, Streeter assumed more offensive responsibilities, also receiving a promotion to passing game coordinator. Streeter's recruiting coordinator duties were passed on to defensive tackles coach Todd Bates.

On December 14, 2021, Streeter was promoted to offensive coordinator and quarterbacks coach at Clemson, replacing Tony Elliott after his departure to become the head coach at the University of Virginia.

Streeter was fired on January 12, 2023, after completing his first full season as offensive coordinator.

=== Georgia ===
On March 20, 2023, Streeter was hired as an offensive analyst by the University of Georgia.

== Personal life ==
A native of Gettysburg, Pennsylvania, Streeter is the son of Barry Streeter, the long-time head coach of the football team at Gettysburg College. During the Bullets home games, Streeter would have the responsibilities of making sure that the cord of his father's headset was not stepped on by players and assistant coaches. He was promoted to ball boy once the program received wireless headsets.

Streeter and his wife Ashleigh have three children, Chamberlin Brooke, Foard Michael, and Mason Morgan.
