= Eric Striker =

American gridiron football player (born 1993)

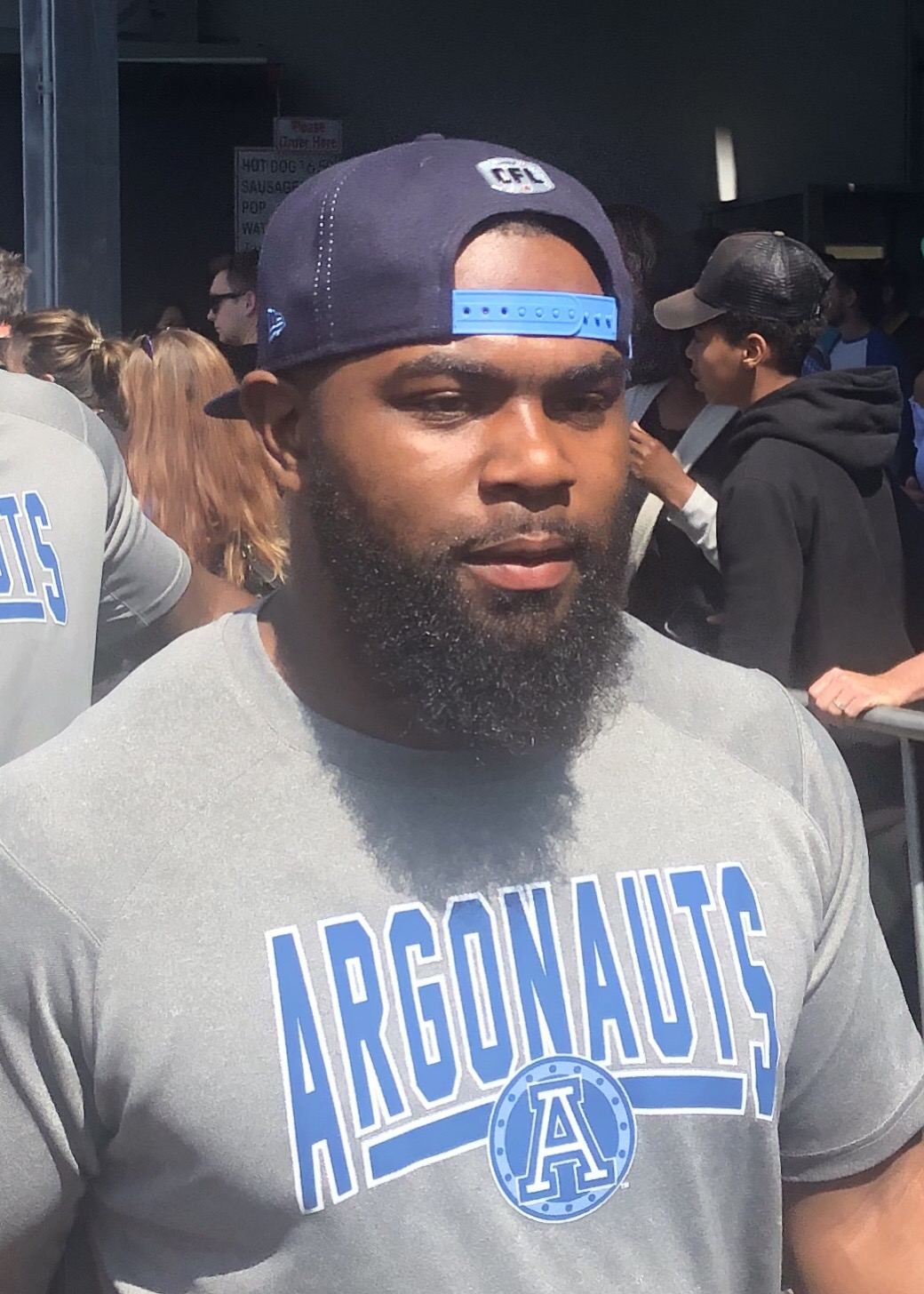
- Striker before a Toronto Argonauts game in 2019

No. 18, 19
- Position: Defensive lineman

Personal information
- Born: October 1, 1993 (age 33); Tampa, Florida, U.S.
- Listed height: 5 ft 11 in (1.80 m)
- Listed weight: 230 lb (104 kg)

Career information
- High school: Armwood (Seffner, Florida)
- College: Oklahoma
- NFL draft: 2016: undrafted

Career history
- Buffalo Bills (2016)*; Saskatchewan Roughriders (2018); Toronto Argonauts (2018–2019)
- * Offseason or practice squad member only

Awards and highlights
- 2× First-team All-Big 12 (2014, 2015); Second-team All-Big 12 (2013); AP Third-Team All-American (2014); AP Second-Team All-American (2015)
- Stats at CFL.ca

Eric Striker (born October 1, 1993) is an American former professional football defensive lineman. He played college football at Oklahoma.

== Early life ==
Striker grew up in Tampa, Florida, and attended Armwood High School, where he played football, baseball and ran track. In football, he set the school-record for career sacks with 42. As a junior in 2010, he made 125 tackles and 16 sacks. In his senior year, he racked up 109 tackles, 11 sacks and 18 tackles for loss, and earned Sports Illustrated first team All-American honors. He was rated as a four-star recruit by Rivals and 247sports, and a three-star by ESPN and Scout.

== College career ==
=== Freshman season ===
In his final season at Armwood, Striker accepted a scholarship from Bob Stoops to play for the Oklahoma Sooners. As a freshman in 2012, he played in all 13 games, but only recorded stats in the game against the Kansas Jayhawks, making six tackles.

=== Sophomore season ===
As a sophomore, Striker earned a starting position and started every game. In a loss to rival Texas, he made a career-high seven tackles with a pass breakup and a tackle for loss. Against Kansas one week later, Striker got his first career sack, along with six tackles. At Oklahoma State in the annual Bedlam Series, he returned a fumble three yards for a touchdown on the final play of the game. In the final game of the year, Striker helped Oklahoma upset Alabama in the 2014 Sugar Bowl, recording a career-high three sacks and tying a career-high seven tackles. In the final minute of the game, he also got the first forced fumble of his career when he stripped Bama's quarterback, A. J. McCarron, followed by defensive end Geneo Grissom picking it up and running it in for a touchdown to seal the Sooners' victory.

=== Senior season ===
During his senior season, Striker started all 13 games at outside linebacker. He tied a career-high in tackles with 12, three going for a loss, along with two sacks and a forced fumble against West Virginia on October 10. On October 24, 2015, he recorded his first interception in his collegiate career in a home game against Texas Tech. He caught the ball at the line of scrimmage and returned it inside the 5-yard-line. He recorded 6 tackles, three for a loss, against Clemson in the Orange Bowl.

Season	G	GS	UT	AT	Total	TFL	Sacks	INT	FF	FR	PBU
2012	13	0	3	3	6	0	0	0	0	0	0
2013	13	13	28	22	50	10	6.5	0	1	1	3
2014	13	13	45	23	68	17	9	0	0	2	5
2015	13	13	41	26	67	19	7	1	1	1	3

== Professional career ==
=== Buffalo Bills ===
On April 30, 2016, Striker was signed as an undrafted free agent by the Buffalo Bills. On August 30, 2016, Striker was waived by the Bills. In April 2017, Striker was hired by Oklahoma head coach Bob Stoops as the Sooners' Defensive Recruiting Analyst.

=== Saskatchewan Roughriders ===
Striker attended tryouts and mini-camp with the Saskatchewan Roughriders in Bradenton, Florida and was subsequently signed by the team in April 2018. He made the team and played in the first game of the season against the Toronto Argonauts and recorded two tackles. He only played in one game before being traded to the Argonauts on July 3, 2018.

=== Toronto Argonauts ===
For the Toronto Argonauts, Striker played eight games, registering 17 defensive tackles and four special teams tackles.
