= Pflugerville High School =

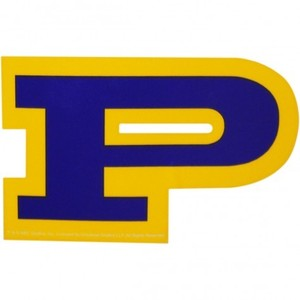
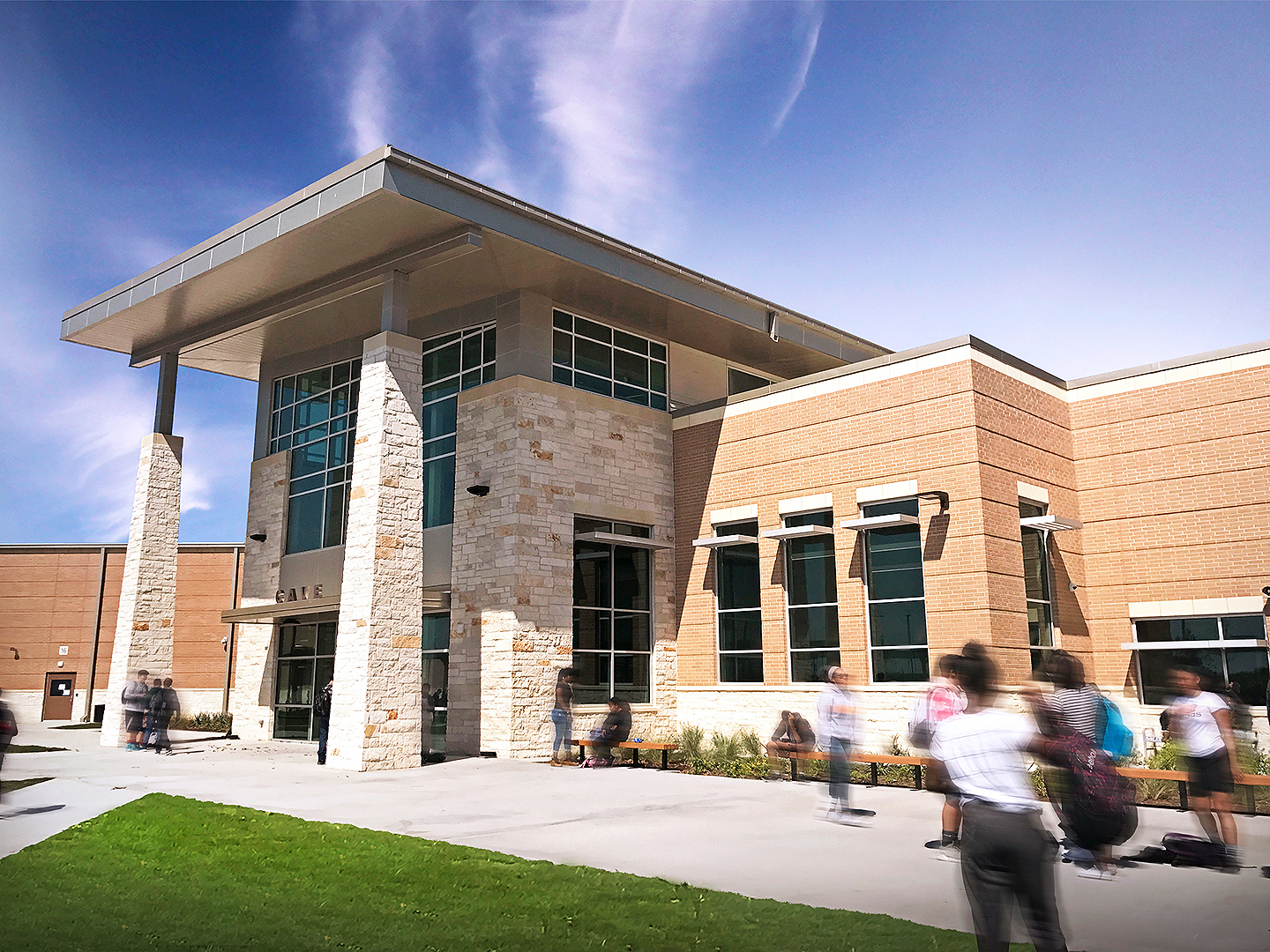

Location
- 1301 W. Pecan Street; Pflugerville, Texas 78660; United States; 30.4443°N 97.63255°W

Information
- Type: Public high school
- Established: 1973
- School district: Pflugerville Independent School District
- Principal: Jon Bailey
- Staff: 136.35 (FTE)
- Grades: 9–12
- Enrollment: 1,828 (2025–2026)
- Student to teacher ratio: 13.58
- Colors: Royal blue and gold
- Athletics conference: UIL Class 5A
- Mascot: Panther
- Website: phs.pfisd.net

Pflugerville High School is a four-year public high school located in Pflugerville, Texas. The school serves Travis County, Texas, and is one of four high schools in the Pflugerville Independent School District. In 2017, the school was a Top-10 Finalist in a Reader's Digest Nicest Places in America contest.

== History ==
Pflugerville Independent School District was consolidated from a variety of rural school districts in 1936. Pflugerville High School was founded in 1973.

== Demographics ==
As of 2026, Pflugerville High School has a student population of 1,813 that is 53.8% Hispanic, 17.8% black, 17.4% white, 6.6% Asian, 4.3% multiracial, 0.1% Native American, and 0.1% Pacific Islander.

== Specialty programs ==
Outside of athletics, Pflugerville High School's extracurricular offerings include fine art, marching band, fire academy and EMT programs, tech programs, and special education programs.

Pflugerville High School's academic curriculum includes Advanced Placement courses and dual credit classes at Austin Community College.

=== Marching band ===
The Pflugerville High School Panther Marching Band is a corps-style marching band, performing a style that includes roll step, backwards marching and sliding, and the "8 to 5" step size. Pflugerville's marching band has won multiple awards. The band has made finals at multiple Bands of America competitions, as well as the Texas Marching Classic. They have reached the UIL 5A State Marching Championship three times, most recently in 2023 with the production "Return to Neverland".

== Athletics ==
Pflugerville High School offers athletic programs in twelve primary sports: baseball, basketball, football, golf, powerlifting, soccer, softball, swimming, tennis, track and field, volleyball, and wrestling.

=== 1958-1962: 55-game winning streak ===
In the late 1950s, Pflugerville gained national attention for winning 55 consecutive games. At the time, the achievement was a state and national record. The streak ended with a 12–6 loss to Holland High School in the 1962 Bi-District round of the playoffs. In 1964, Pflugerville's national winning streak record was broken by Jefferson City, Missouri.

In 1958 and 1959, PHS fielded eight-man football teams and played in the Class B division until 1967. The Panthers won 5 District Championships, 2 Bi-District Championships, and 4 Regional Championships. Through those five seasons, the Panthers scored 2,585 points; they allowed just 256 and recorded 31 shutouts of their opponents. The record for most consecutive victories is now held by De La Salle High School in California with 151 wins from 1992 to 2004, and the Texas record is now held by Celina High School, who won 68 games from 1998 to 2002. Pflugerville still ranks second all-time in Texas.

=== 1986-Present: Kuempel Stadium ===
The 10,000-capacity Kuempel Stadium was dedicated in October 1986. The field is named for Charles and H. L. "Hub" Kuempel, both graduates of Pflugerville High School. They served the Pflugerville schools for a combined 49 years and coached PHS to 55 consecutive football victories. From its construction through the 2004 season, Kuempel Stadium had a natural grass playing surface. On February 5, 2005, voters approved a multimillion dollar bond package that included funds to convert the field to artificial turf. Construction was finished prior to the start of the 2005 season.

Today, the stadium serves as the venue for non-varsity Pflugerville High School games as well as middle school games. It is also used for practice by track, cross country, football, soccer, dance, and marching band.

Kuempel Stadium was the original stadium filmed for the 2006 television series Friday Night Lights. The team named themselves the Dillon Panthers (after the Pflugerville Panthers) and used many of Pflugerville's mascot items for the show.

=== 2018-present: The Pfield ===
The 10,000 capacity flagship stadium was constructed between 2016 and 2017 and opened in the 2017–18 school year. It is used by the football teams of all four high schools in PfISD, but not all of Pflugerville's games (Kuempel Stadium is occasionally used instead).

=== NFL draftees ===
During the 2013 NFL draft, Pflugerville High School graduates Zaviar Gooden and Alex Okafor were drafted by the Tennessee Titans and Arizona Cardinals respectively. In the 2014 NFL draft, IK Enemkpali was drafted by the New York Jets. In the 2015 NFL draft, Tyrus Thompson was drafted by the Minnesota Vikings.

== Alumni ==
- Nate Minchey, professional baseball player
- Mario Ramos (1994), professional baseball player
- Micah Lawrence (2008), U.S. Olympic athlete
- Garrett Lindholm (2006), American football placekicker
- Zaviar Gooden (2008), American football player
- Alex Okafor, American football player
- Ikemefuna Enemkpali, NFL football player
- Michael Johnson, NFL football player
- Riley Stearns, filmmaker
- Tyrus Thompson, American football player
- Pooh Shiesty, American rapper
- Eugene Lee Yang, actor and internet personality
- Casey Washington, NFL football player
