= Zaviar Gooden =

American football player and coach (born 1990)

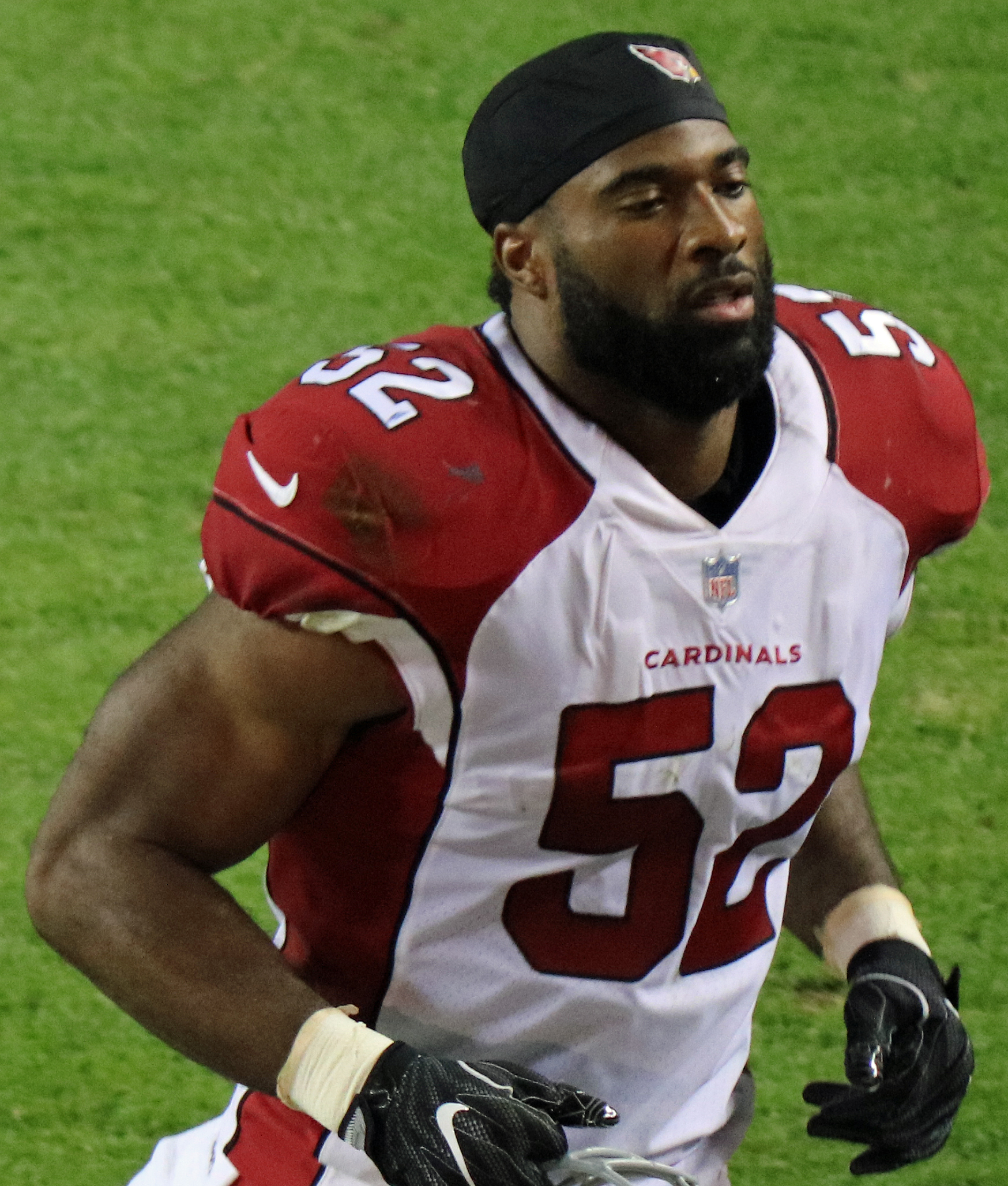
- Gooden with the Arizona Cardinals in 2017

Denver Broncos
- Title: Assistant strength and conditioning coach

Personal information
- Born: August 31, 1990 (age 36); Austin, Texas, U.S.
- Listed height: 6 ft 1 in (1.85 m)
- Listed weight: 231 lb (105 kg)

Career information
- Position: Linebacker (No. 50, 47, 52)
- High school: Pflugerville (Pflugerville, Texas)
- College: Missouri
- NFL draft: 2013: 3rd round, 97th overall pick

Career history

Playing
- Tennessee Titans (2013–2015); Detroit Lions (2016); Arizona Cardinals (2016)

Coaching
- Notre Dame (2018) Coaching intern; SMU (2018) Assistant strength and conditioning coach; USC (2021) Assistant strength and conditioning coach; LSU (2022–2025) Assistant development coach; Denver Broncos (2026–present) Assistant strength and conditioning coach

Career NFL statistics
- Total tackles: 43
- Stats at Pro Football Reference

Zaviar Gooden (born August 31, 1990) is an American professional football coach and former player who was a linebacker in the National Football League (NFL) for four seasons and is currently an assistant strength and conditioning coach for the Denver Broncos. He was selected by the Tennessee Titans in the third round of the 2013 NFL draft. He played college football for the Missouri Tigers.

Gooden played with the Titans for two seasons in a reserve role, before being released shortly after the beginning of the 2015 season. In the 2016 regular season, he had brief stints as a backup with the Detroit Lions and the Arizona Cardinals.

== Early life ==
Gooden was born in Austin, Texas. He attended Pflugerville High School, and played for he Pflugerville Panthers high school football team. During high school, he played as both a safety and running back. Rivals.com rated Gooden as the 32nd best high school linebacker prospect his age, and the 56th best all round prospect in Texas. He graduated from high school with a 3.9 grade point average (GPA). Gooden received athletic scholarship offers from Oklahoma State, Purdue and Stanford, but chose to attend the University of Missouri.

He also spent four years on the track & field team in high school, competing in the 200-meter, long jump (20 ft 5 in), 4 × 100 m relay (42.98) and 4 × 400 m relay (3:21.17).

== College career ==
Gooden enrolled in the University of Missouri, where he played for coach Gary Pinkel's Missouri Tigers football team from 2009 to 2012. Before the start of his freshman season, Gooden made the transition from safety to linebacker. During his first season he was used as backup to the starting linebackers, but played in 13 games, making 30 tackles and forcing one fumble.

It was his sophomore season that Gooden became a starter and immediately made a big impact. From the 13 games, he led the team in defense, making 84 tackles and three sacks, breaking up five passes and making two interceptions. He kept up his momentum in his junior season, with 80 tackles, one sack, two interceptions and four broken up passes in his 13 games.

His senior season was broken up by a hamstring injury and he played only 10 games, from which he made 61 tackles and a single interception, which was returned for a touchdown versus Southeastern Louisiana Lions.

== Professional career ==
Pre-draft measurables
Height	Weight	Arm length	Hand span	Wingspan	40-yard dash	10-yard split	20-yard split	20-yard shuttle	Three-cone drill	Vertical jump	Broad jump	Bench press
6 ft 1 1/2 in (1.87 m)	234 lb (106 kg)	32 1/4 in (0.82 m)	10 in (0.25 m)	6 ft 4 5/8 in (1.95 m)	4.47 s	1.54 s	2.58 s	4.18 s	6.71 s	38.5 in (0.98 m)	10 ft 11 in (3.33 m)	27 reps
All values from NFL Combine/Missouri's Pro Day

=== Tennessee Titans ===
The Tennessee Titans selected Gooden in the third round with the 97th overall pick of the 2013 NFL draft.

On September 5, 2015, Gooden was placed on injured reserve with a hamstring injury, but was waived the following week.

=== Detroit Lions ===
On May 2, 2016, the Detroit Lions signed Gooden to a one-year contract. On September 3, 2016, he was waived by the Lions. He was signed to the practice squad on September 21, 2016. He was promoted to the active roster on September 24. He was released on September 26 and was re-signed to the practice squad the next day. He was released on October 13, 2016.

=== Arizona Cardinals ===
On November 1, 2016, Gooden was signed to the Arizona Cardinals' practice squad. He was promoted to the active roster on November 18, 2016.

On September 2, 2017, Gooden was released by the Cardinals.

== Coaching career ==
=== Notre Dame ===
In the spring of 2018, Gooden served as a strength and conditioning coaching intern at Notre Dame.

=== SMU ===
In the summer of 2018, Gooden was an assistant strength and conditioning coach for SMU.

After his stint at SMU, he worked as a speed and performance coach at D1 Sports Training in the Dallas/Fort Worth area from 2018 to 2019. He then served as the head sports and fitness trainer at CRA-Z Sports Training from 2019 to 2020.

=== USC ===
In January 2021, Gooden was hired by USC as an assistant strength and conditioning coach.

=== LSU ===
Gooden joined LSU as an assistant development coach on December 20, 2021.

=== Denver Broncos ===
On March 8, 2026, it was announced that Gooden would be joining the Denver Broncos' strength and conditioning staff.
