= Tyrus Thompson =

American football player (born 1991)

No. 72, 74
- Position: Offensive tackle

Personal information
- Born: November 17, 1991 (age 34); Germany
- Listed height: 6 ft 5 in (1.96 m)
- Listed weight: 324 lb (147 kg)

Career information
- High school: Pflugerville (Pflugerville, Texas, U.S.)
- College: Oklahoma
- NFL draft: 2015: 6th round, 185th overall pick

Career history
- Minnesota Vikings (2015); Jacksonville Jaguars (2015)*; Detroit Lions (2015–2016)*; New Orleans Saints (2016); Carolina Panthers (2016–2017)*; Seattle Seahawks (2017)
- * Offseason or practice squad member only

Awards and highlights
- First-team All-Big 12 (2014)
- Stats at Pro Football Reference

Tyrus Thompson (born November 17, 1991) is an American former professional football offensive tackle. He played college football at Oklahoma. He was selected by the Minnesota Vikings in the sixth round of the 2015 NFL draft.

== Early life ==
Thompson attended Pflugerville High School in Pflugerville, Texas, where he was a two-sport star in both football and track. He was regarded as a four-star recruit and was ranked as the No. 18 offensive tackle in the nation by Scout.com, Rivals.com and ESPN.com. Overall, he was considered the No. 164 overall player by Rivals and No. 133 by PrepStar. Also a standout in track & field, Thompson was one of the state's top performers in the throwing events with personal-bests of 16.96 meters (55–6.25) in the shot put and 42.58 meters (139–7) in the discus.

== College career ==
Thompson attended the University of Oklahoma and played college football under head coach Bob Stoops.

Thompson played offensive tackle for the Oklahoma Sooners from 2010 to 2014. After redshirting during his first season, he appeared in five games as an offensive tackle in 2011.

As a sophomore in 2012, Thompson appeared in all thirteen games and made five starts, splitting time with Lane Johnson. He started games at both left and right offensive tackle.

He became Oklahoma’s primary left offensive tackle the following season, starting 11 of 13 games in 2013, missing two games due to an injury.

Thompson returned as the Sooners’ starting left tackle for his senior season in 2014 and started all 13 games. Following the season, he was named first-team All-Big 12 by the conference’s coaches, ESPN, and Fox Sports. He also received second-team All-Big 12 honors from the Associated Press, Athlon Sports, and Phil Steele.

Over His final three collegiate seasons, Thompson appeared in 39 games and made 29 starts, primarily at left offensive tackle.

== Professional career ==
=== Pre-draft ===
Thompson was projected to be selected in the fourth or fifth round by the majority of scouts and NFL draft experts.

Pre-draft measurables
Height	Weight	40-yard dash	10-yard split	20-yard split	20-yard shuttle	Vertical jump	Broad jump	Bench press
6 ft 5 in (1.96 m)	324 lb (147 kg)	5.35 s	1.87 s	3.08 s	4.92 s	29 in (0.74 m)	8 ft 1 in (2.46 m)	29 reps
All values from NFL Combine, 40-yard dash from Pro Day

=== Minnesota Vikings ===
Thompson was selected by the Minnesota Vikings in the sixth round, 185th overall, in the 2015 NFL draft. He was placed on injured reserve on September 6, 2015. He was released on September 18, 2015.

=== Jacksonville Jaguars ===
Thompson was signed to the practice squad of the Jacksonville Jaguars on September 18, 2015.

=== Detroit Lions ===
Thompson signed with the Detroit Lions on November 10, 2016. He was released on May 9, 2016.

=== New Orleans Saints ===
On May 16, 2016, Thompson signed with the New Orleans Saints. He was placed on injured reserve on September 4, and was released by the Saints on October 10.

=== Carolina Panthers ===
On November 29, 2016, Thompson was signed to the Carolina Panthers' practice squad. He signed a reserve/future contract with the Panthers on January 2, 2017. He was waived on August 12, 2017.

=== Seattle Seahawks ===
On August 21, 2017, Thompson signed with the Seattle Seahawks. His contract expired on January 4, 2018.

== Personal life ==
Thompson is the son of Raymond and Yolanda Thompson. He was born in Germany while his father was stationed abroad as a paratrooper in the U.S. Army. He chose his jersey number in honor of the year his mother was born. He has two siblings.
