= Cole Stoudt =

American football player and coach (born 1992)

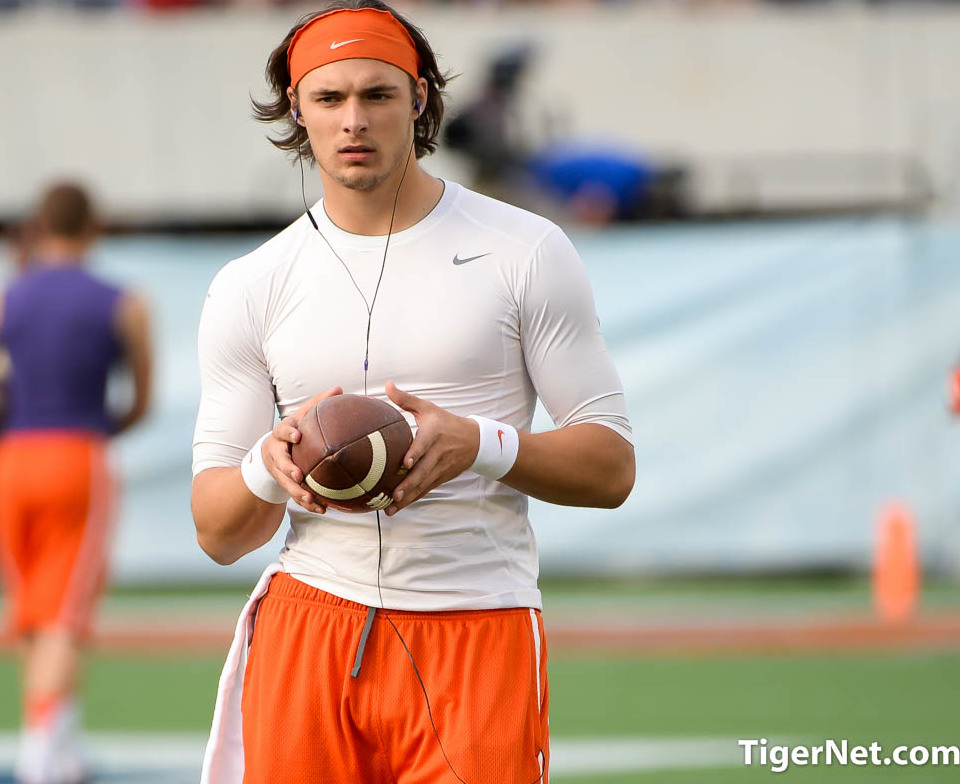
- Stoudt at the 2014 Russell Athletic Bowl

Clemson Tigers
- Title: Offensive player development

Personal information
- Born: October 23, 1992 (age 34); Dublin, Ohio, U.S.
- Listed height: 6 ft 4 in (1.93 m)
- Listed weight: 220 lb (100 kg)

Career information
- High school: Dublin Coffman
- College: Clemson (2011–2014)
- NFL draft: 2015: undrafted

Career history

Playing
- San Diego Chargers (2015)*
- * Offseason or practice squad member only

Coaching
- Jacksonville State (2015) Graduate assistant; Jacksonville State (2016–2017) Offensive assistant; Morehead State (2018) Quarterbacks coach; Morehead State (2019–2020) Quarterbacks coach & offensive recruiting coordinator; Clemson (2021–present) Offensive player development
- Stats at Pro Football Reference

Cole Stoudt (born October 23, 1992) is an American football coach and former player. He is currently an offensive player development coach at Clemson University, where he played college football and was the Tigers starting quarterback in 2014.

== Early life ==
Stoudt’s high school career took place at Dublin Coffman High School located in Dublin, Ohio. He was coached under head coach Mark Crabtree where he was ranked as the No. 21 quarterback in the nation by Rivals.com, No. 28 quarterback in the nation by Scout.com, and No. 23 quarterback in the nation by 247Sports.com. He was extremely successful during his years as starting quarterback. He broke the overall passing yardage and touchdown records for Dublin Coffman High School that was previously held by Brady Quinn.

In his high school career, Stoudt passed for 4,393 yards, 52 touchdowns and only 11 interceptions. He also holds the school record for career wins as a starting quarterback and passing touchdowns in a game (5). His most successful season was likely in 2010, during his senior year. He completed 2,159 passing yards and 22 passing touchdowns with only 6 interceptions. He was awarded Conference Player of the Year in 2010 as well. Cole Stoudt was recruited by Clemson University, University of Akron, Arizona State University, University of Cincinnati, and the University of Colorado. Billy Napier recruited him from Clemson University. His first official visit date at Clemson took place in October 2010.

Stoudt is also the son of Cliff Stoudt, a former NFL and USFL quarterback.

== College career ==
=== 2011–2013 seasons ===
Stoudt spent his first three years at Clemson as the backup quarterback to Tajh Boyd. In 2011, he played briefly during the following games in the regular season against Troy, Boston College, North Carolina, North Carolina State, Virginia Tech, and during the Discover Orange Bowl against West Virginia. During this season he completed a total of 12 passes out of 21 pass attempts, for an average completion percentage per game of approximately 66.8%. He passed for 115 total yards and rushed for −7 yards. He threw for no interceptions or touchdowns during the entirety of this season.

In 2012, Stoudt made an appearance during the Ball State, Furman, Wake Forest, Duke, and Maryland games. He completed a total of 27 out of 39 pass attempts for an average pass completion rate of 74.5%. He passed for a total of 212 yards and rushed for a total of 55 yards during the 2012 season and threw for 1 interception and 3 touchdowns.

In 2013, Stoudt played in the games against South Carolina State, Wake Forest, Syracuse, Florida State, Maryland, Virginia, Georgia Tech, and the Citadel. He completed a total of 47 out of 59 pass attempts for an average completion rate of 77%. He passed for a total of 415 yards and rushed for a total of 58. He threw for zero interceptions and passed for 5 touchdowns and rushed for 2. On April 15, 2014, Clemson coach Dabo Swinney named Stoudt the starter for the 2014 season.

=== 2014 season ===
The 2014 football season was Stoudt’s senior season. Out of 13 games during the entire season, he started eight of those games. He had 1,892 yards and nine touchdowns with 624 snaps for the season as well as 63.2% pass completion percentage. He was ranked sixth in school history for the pass completion percentage and seventh in the Atlantic Coast Conference in passing completion efficiency for the 2014 season. Overall for his college career, Stoudt threw only 11 interceptions yet 10 of those were in his final year playing at Clemson. He threw three interceptions in an ACC rivalry game versus Georgia Tech; as Clemson went on to lose that game 28–6, breaking a six-game winning streak. In his final college game, Stoudt delivered a winning performance at the 2014 Russell Athletic Bowl with a final score of 40–6. Stoudt had four touchdowns, throwing for three and running for another. He completed 26 of 36 pass attempts for a season high of 319 yards. He was honored as Most Valuable Player and team offensive player-of-the-game for the Russell Athletic Bowl.

== Professional career ==
Shortly after the conclusion of the 2015 NFL draft, Stoudt was signed by the San Diego Chargers as an undrafted rookie free agent. On May 20, 2015, Stoudt was released by the Chargers.

== Coaching career ==
Shortly after being cut by the Chargers, Stoudt joined the staff at Jacksonville State as a graduate assistant and was promoted to offensive assistant in 2016. He was also the quarterbacks coach at Morehead State from 2018 to 2020 before accepting a position at his alma mater Clemson as an offensive player development coach.
