= Ahmad Thomas =

American football player (born 1994)

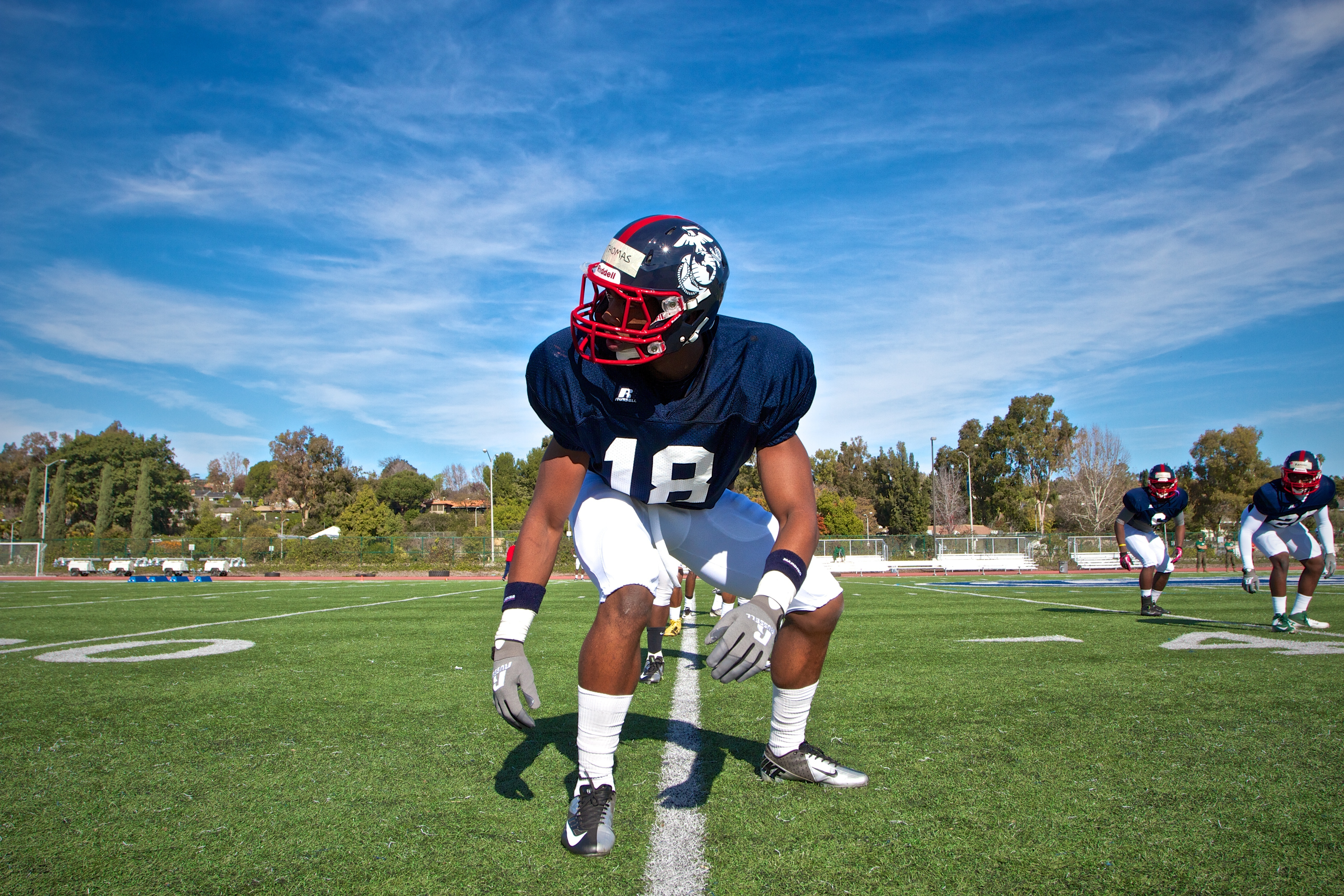
- Thomas at Semper Fidelis All-American Bowl practice in 2012

No. 54, 52, 43
- Position: Linebacker

Personal information
- Born: December 15, 1994 (age 31); Miami, Florida, U.S.
- Listed height: 6 ft 0 in (1.83 m)
- Listed weight: 220 lb (100 kg)

Career information
- High school: Miami Central (West Little River, Florida)
- College: Oklahoma
- NFL draft: 2017: undrafted

Career history
- Oakland Raiders (2017)*; Green Bay Packers (2017–2018)*; Indianapolis Colts (2018–2019); Atlanta Falcons (2019); Montreal Alouettes (2021)
- * Offseason or practice squad member only

Career NFL statistics
- Total tackles: 2
- Stats at Pro Football Reference
- Stats at CFL.ca

Ahmad Thomas (born December 15, 1994) is an American former professional football player who was a linebacker in the National Football League (NFL) and Canadian Football League (CFL). He played college football for the Oklahoma Sooners.

== Professional career ==
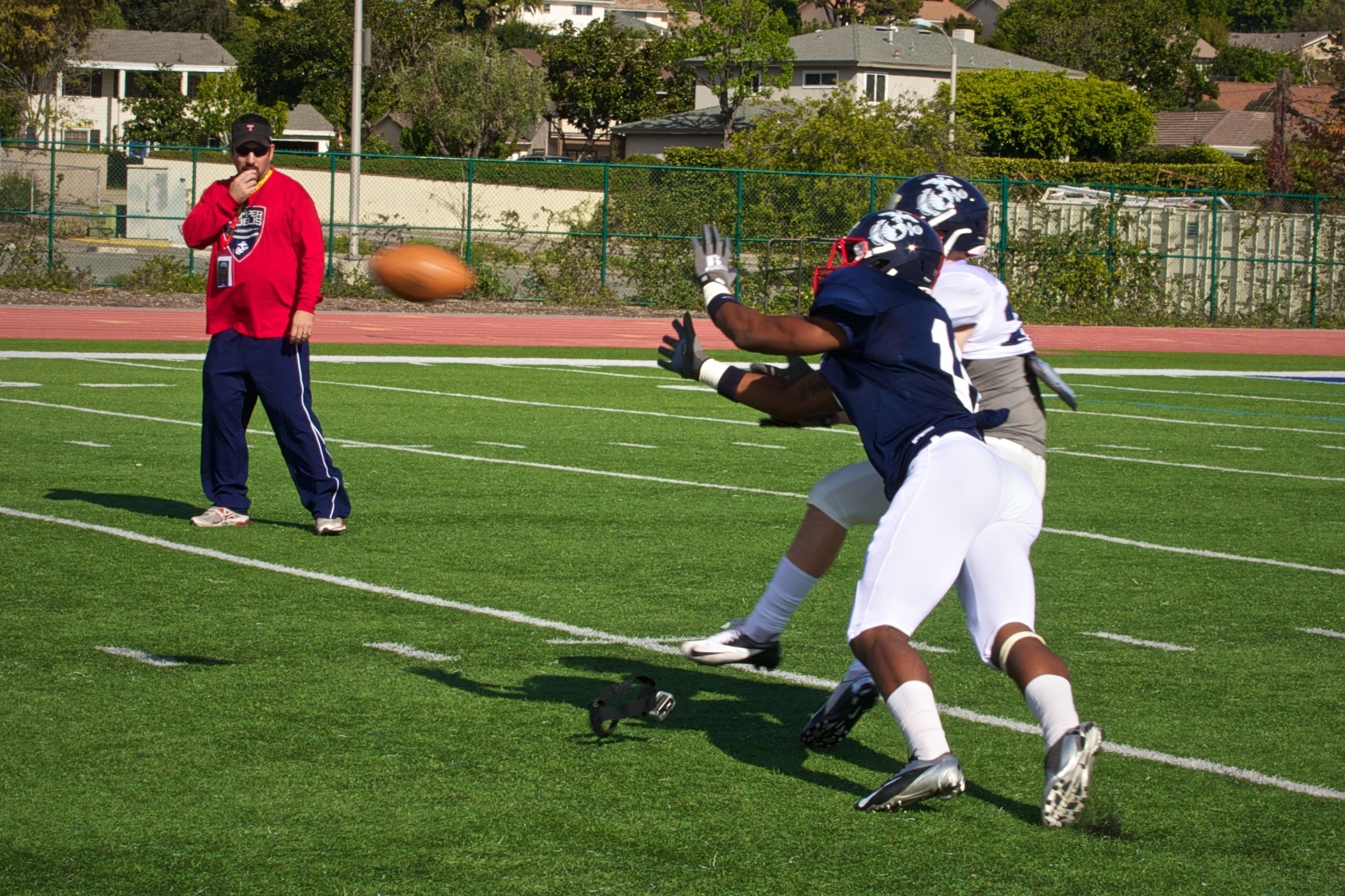
Thomas covering Ryan Switzer at Semper Fidelis All-American Bowl practice in 2012

=== Oakland Raiders ===
Thomas was signed by the Oakland Raiders as an undrafted free agent on May 5, 2017, but was waived three days later.

=== Green Bay Packers ===
On November 29, 2017, Thomas was signed to the Green Bay Packers practice squad. He signed a reserve/future contract with the team on January 4, 2018.

On September 1, 2018, Thomas was waived by the Packers.

=== Indianapolis Colts ===
On September 3, 2018, Thomas was signed to the Indianapolis Colts practice squad. He was promoted to the active roster on December 14, 2018.

Thomas was waived/injured during final roster cuts on August 31, 2019, and reverted to the team's injured reserve list the next day. He was waived from injured reserve with an injury settlement on September 11.

=== Atlanta Falcons ===
On October 1, 2019, Thomas was signed to the Atlanta Falcons practice squad. He was promoted to the active roster on December 10, 2019.

On August 5, 2020, Thomas was waived by the Falcons.

=== Montreal Alouettes ===
Thomas signed with the Montreal Alouettes on January 21, 2021. He was placed on the reserve/suspended list on May 15, 2022.
