= 2014 Russell Athletic Bowl =

American college football game

- 25th Russell Athletic Bowl
Oklahoma Sooners	Clemson Tigers
(8–4)	(9–3)
Big 12	ACC
6	40
Head coach: Bob Stoops	Head coach: Dabo Swinney
AP / Coaches / CFP; NR / 24 / NR	AP / Coaches / CFP; 18 / 18 / 17
	1	2	3	4	Total
Oklahoma	0	0	0	6	6
Clemson	17	10	13	0	40
- Date: December 29, 2014
- Season: 2014
- Stadium: Orlando Citrus Bowl
- Location: Orlando, Florida
- MVP: Clemson QB Cole Stoudt
- Favorite: Oklahoma by 6.5
- National anthem: Liberty Voices
- Referee: Matt Moore (SEC)
- Attendance: 40,071

United States TV coverage
- Network: ESPN/ESPN Radio
- Announcers: Mike Patrick, Ed Cunningham, & Jeannine Edwards (ESPN); Bill Rosinski, David Norrie, & Joe Schad (ESPN Radio)

The 2014 Russell Athletic Bowl was a college football bowl game played on December 29, 2014, at Orlando Citrus Bowl Stadium in Orlando, Florida. This was the 25th Russell Athletic Bowl. It was one of the 2014–15 NCAA football bowl games that concluded the 2014 NCAA Division I FBS football season. It was sponsored by the Russell Athletic uniform company.

The game featured the Oklahoma Sooners and the Clemson Tigers. Oklahoma placed in a three-way tie for fourth in the Big 12 Conference. Clemson was the runner-up in the Atlantic Division of the Atlantic Coast Conference.

This was the fourth overall meeting between these two teams, with Oklahoma leading the series 2–1 going into the game. The previous time these two teams met was in the 1989 Citrus Bowl, when Clemson won 13–6.

Kickoff was expected to be around 5:30 pm ET.

== Game summary ==
=== Scoring summary ===
Scoring summary

Quarter	Time	Drive			Team	Scoring information	Score	
Quarter	Time	Plays	Yards	TOP	Team	Scoring information	OKLA	CLEM
1	13:26	1	65	0:12	CLEM	Artavis Scott 65-yard touchdown reception from Cole Stoudt, Ammon Lakip kick good	0	7
1	8:21	9	37	3:38	CLEM	34-yard field goal by Ammon Lakip	0	10
1	3:26	–	–	–	CLEM	Interception returned 47 yards for touchdown by Ben Boulware, Ammon Lakip kick good	0	17
2	14:00	9	48	2:36	CLEM	49-yard field goal by Ammon Lakip	0	20
2	7:34	14	80	5:09	CLEM	Mike Williams 26-yard touchdown reception from Cole Stoudt, Ammon Lakip kick good	0	27
3	9:24	5	50	1:33	CLEM	Cole Stoudt 2-yard touchdown run, Ammon Lakip kick good	0	34
3	1:42	11	80	4:18	CLEM	Germone Hopper 24-yard touchdown reception from Cole Stoudt, Ammon Lakip kick no good (miss left)	0	40
4	6:57	5	43	1:38	OKLA	Alex Ross 11-yard touchdown run, Michael Hunnicutt kick no good (blocked)	6	40
"TOP" = time of possession. For other American football terms, see Glossary of American football.							6	40

=== Statistics ===
Statistics	OKLA	CLEM
First downs	17	22
Plays–yards	68–275	79–387
Rushes–yards	31–172	42–68
Passing yards	103	319
Passing: Comp–Att–Int	17–37–3	26–37–0
Time of possession	27:36	32:24
