= 2016 Music City Bowl =

College football bowl game

2016 Franklin American Mortgage Music City Bowl
- 19th Music City Bowl
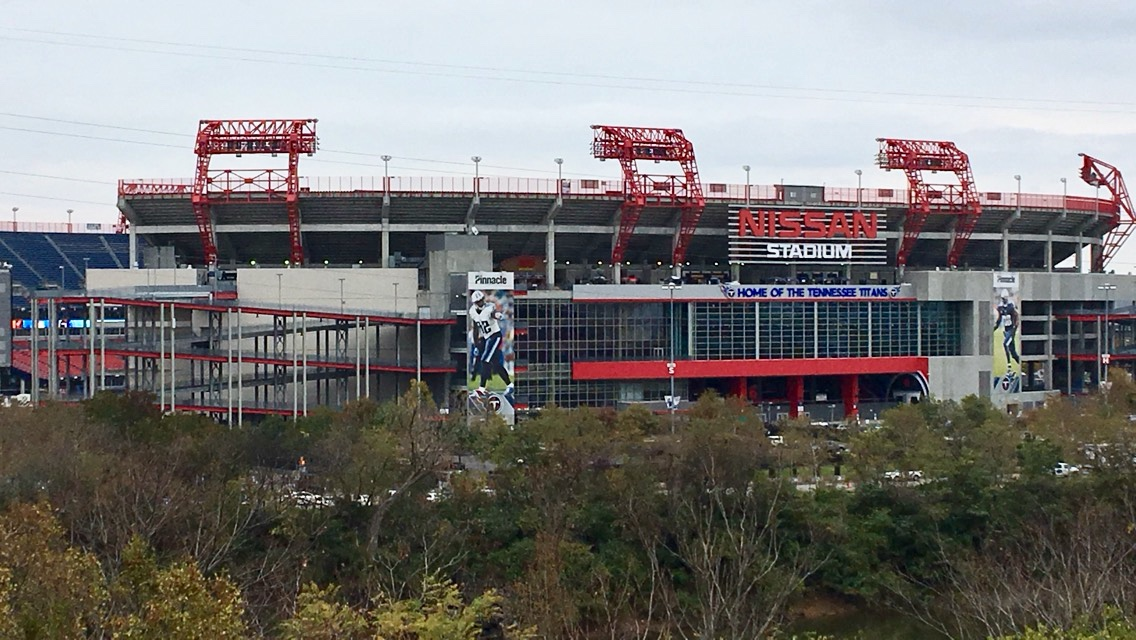
- Nissan Stadium in Nashville hosted the game
Nebraska Cornhuskers	Tennessee Volunteers
(9–3)	(8–4)
Big Ten	SEC
24	38
Head coach: Mike Riley	Head coach: Butch Jones
AP / Coaches / CFP; 24 / 21 / NR	AP / Coaches / CFP; NR / NR / 21
	1	2	3	4	Total
Nebraska	0	7	7	10	24
Tennessee	0	21	3	14	38
- Date: December 30, 2016
- Season: 2016
- Stadium: Nissan Stadium
- Location: Nashville, Tennessee
- Favorite: Tennessee by 3
- Referee: Mike Mothershed (Pac-12)
- Payout: US$2,750,000

United States TV coverage
- Network: ESPN; ESPN Radio
- Announcers: Tom Hart, Andre Ware, Cole Cubelic (ESPN); Anish Shroff, Ahmad Brooks, Dawn Davenport (ESPN Radio)

The 2016 Music City Bowl, known as the Franklin American Mortgage Music City Bowl for sponsorship purposes, was the nineteenth edition of the college football bowl game, played on December 30, 2016 at Nissan Stadium in Nashville, Tennessee. Part of the 2016–17 bowl season, it featured the Nebraska Cornhuskers of the Big Ten and the Tennessee Volunteers of the SEC.

== Teams ==
The 2016 Music City Bowl was the third all-time meeting between Nebraska and Tennessee. The Cornhuskers defeated the Volunteers in the 1998 Orange Bowl to earn a share of the national championship, and again two years later in the 2000 Fiesta Bowl.

== Game ==
After a scoreless first quarter where both teams had multiple drives stall out with punts, Tennessee jumped out to a 14–0 lead with rushing touchdowns from John Kelly and Joshua Dobbs. The first touchdown drive was mainly from passing the ball and the second was mainly from a balanced rushing attack. Nebraska answered with a 38-yard connection from Ryker Fyfe to Brandon Reilly. Tennessee closed out the second quarter with a Dobbs rushing touchdown from two yards out to go to the half up 21–7. The second half started inconsistent for both teams, with Nebraska fumbling and Tennessee turning the ball over downs on their first series. After a Nebraska punt, Tennessee drove mainly running the ball with two Jauan Jennings receptions to set up successful field goal to go up 24–7. On their next drive, Nebraska scored a touchdown on a drive aided significantly by a Devine Ozigbo 42-yard run that up Reilly's second receiving touchdown from Fyfe. Tennessee's next touchdown drive closed out the third quarter and started the fourth quarter. Tennessee converted three first downs to set up another Dobbs rushing touchdown to make the score 31–14. Nebraska converted a field goal on their next drive, which was set up by big receptions from De'Mornay Pierson-El and Reilly. Tennessee fumbled the ball on their next possession and Nebraska cashed in on a five-play, 31-yard drive that ended with a Fyfe nine-yard touchdown run to make the game 31–24. Tennessee was able to stop the Nebraska scoring run with a four-play, 77-yard drive that was highlighted with a Dobbs-to-Josh Malone 59-yard touchdown reception to make the score 38–24. Nebraska and Tennessee exchanged punts. Nebraska received the ball again and turned the ball over on downs after getting as close as Tennessee's 27-yard line. The drive was stalled by a Fyfe intentional grounding penalty set up by a Jonathan Kongbo sack and Fyfe later being sacked by Derek Barnett. In an effort to run clock, Tennessee ran three times on their next drive and punted. On their last drive, Nebraska turned the ball over on downs. Tennessee ran the clock out on their next play to end the game.

Tennessee's three consecutive seasons with a bowl victory marked the first time since the 1994–1996 seasons that the program accomplished the feat. Barnett's fourth quarter sack was the 33rd of his collegiate career, a new school record.

=== Scoring summary ===
Qtr	Time	Drive			Team	Detail	Score	
Qtr	Time	Plays	Yards	TOP	Team	Detail	NU	TENN
2	13:20	4	73	1:26	TENN	John Kelly 28-yd run (Aaron Medley kick)	0	7
2	7:36	11	66	4:44	TENN	Joshua Dobbs 10-yd run (Medley kick)	0	14
2	1:36	3	80	1:12	NU	Brandon Reilly 38-yd pass from Ryker Fyfe (Drew Brown kick)	7	14
2	0:09	9	75	1:27	TENN	Dobbs 2-yd run (Medley kick)	7	21
3	5:52	8	49	3:20	TENN	Medley 46-yd field goal	7	24
3	3:26	5	75	2:26	NU	Reilly 9-yd pass from Fyfe (Brown kick)	14	24
4	14:09	9	76	4:09	TENN	Dobbs 3-yd run (Medley kick)	14	31
4	12:06	6	47	2:12	NU	Brown 45-yd field goal	17	31
4	10:02	5	31	1:55	NU	Fyfe 9-yd run (Brown kick)	24	31
4	8:45	4	77	1:10	TENN	Josh Malone 59-yd pass from Dobbs (Medley kick)	24	38

=== Individual leaders ===
Team	Category	Player	Statistics
NU	Passing	Ryker Fyfe	17/36, 243 yds, 2 TD
NU	Rushing	Devine Ozigbo	7 car, 66 yds
NU	Receiving	Brandon Reilly	4 rec, 98 yds, 2 TD
TENN	Passing	Joshua Dobbs	23/38, 291 yds, 1 TD
TENN	Rushing	Joshua Dobbs	11 car, 118 yds, 3 TD
TENN	Receiving	Alvin Kamara	7 rec, 46 yds

=== Team statistics ===
Statistic	Nebraska	Tennessee
First downs	18	25
Rushes–yards	28–61	38–230
Comp.–att.–yards	19–42–257	23–38–291
Total offense	318	521
Third downs	5–16	6–14
Turnovers	1	1
Punts–average	7–42.7	6–43.3
Penalties–yards	7–41	6–65
Time of possession	28:28	31:32

== Starting lineups ==
Nebraska	Position		Tennessee
Offense
11 Cethan Carter	TE		82 Ethan Wolf
84 Sam Cotton	TE	WR	15 Jauan Jennings
8 Stanley Morgan	WR		3 Josh Malone
87 Brandon Reilly	WR		25 Josh Smith
17 Ryker Fyfe	QB		11 Joshua Dobbs
34 Terrell Newby	RB		6 Alvin Kamara
68 Nick Gates	LT		52 Drew Richmond
67 Jerald Foster	LG		75 Jason Robertson
66 Dylan Utter	C		55 Coleman Thomas
63 Tanner Farmer	RG		71 Dylan Wiesman
62 Cole Conrad	RT		63 Brett Kendrick
Defense
55 Kevin Maurice	DT		1 Jonathan Kongbo
44 Mick Stoltenberg	DT		39 Kendal Vickers
91 Freedom Akinmoladun	DE		5 Derek Barnett
88 Ross Dzuris	DE		50 Corey Vereen
52 Josh Banderas	LB		34 Darrin Kirkland
5 Dedrick Young	LB		20 Cortez McDowell
10 Joshua Kalu	CB		13 Malik Foreman
8 Chris Jones	CB		23 Cameron Sutton
1 Lamar Jackson	S		22 Micah Abernathy
16 Antonio Reed	S		7 Rashaan Gaulden
24 Aaron Williams	S		24 Todd Kelly
