= 2016 Nebraska Cornhuskers football team =

American college football season

2016 Nebraska Cornhuskers football

Music City Bowl, L 24–38 vs. Tennessee
- Conference: Big Ten Conference
- West Division
- Record: 9–4 (6–3 Big Ten)
- Head coach: Mike Riley (2nd season)
- Offensive coordinator: Danny Langsdorf (2nd season)
- Offensive scheme: Multiple
- Defensive coordinator: Mark Banker (2nd season)
- Base defense: 4–3
- Home stadium: Memorial Stadium

2016 Big Ten Conference football standings
	Conf.			Overall
Team	W		L	W		L
East Division
No. 7 Penn State xy$	8	–	1	11	–	3
No. 6 Ohio State x^	8	–	1	11	–	2
No. 10 Michigan	7	–	2	10	–	3
Indiana	4	–	5	6	–	7
Maryland	3	–	6	6	–	7
Michigan State	1	–	8	3	–	9
Rutgers	0	–	9	2	–	10
West Division
No. 9 Wisconsin xy	7	–	2	11	–	3
Iowa	6	–	3	8	–	5
Nebraska	6	–	3	9	–	4
Minnesota	5	–	4	9	–	4
Northwestern	5	–	4	7	–	6
Illinois	2	–	7	3	–	9
Purdue	1	–	8	3	–	9
Championship: Penn State 38, Wisconsin 31
^ – College Football Playoff participant; $ – Conference champion; x – Division champion/co-champions; y – Championship game participant; Rankings from AP Poll

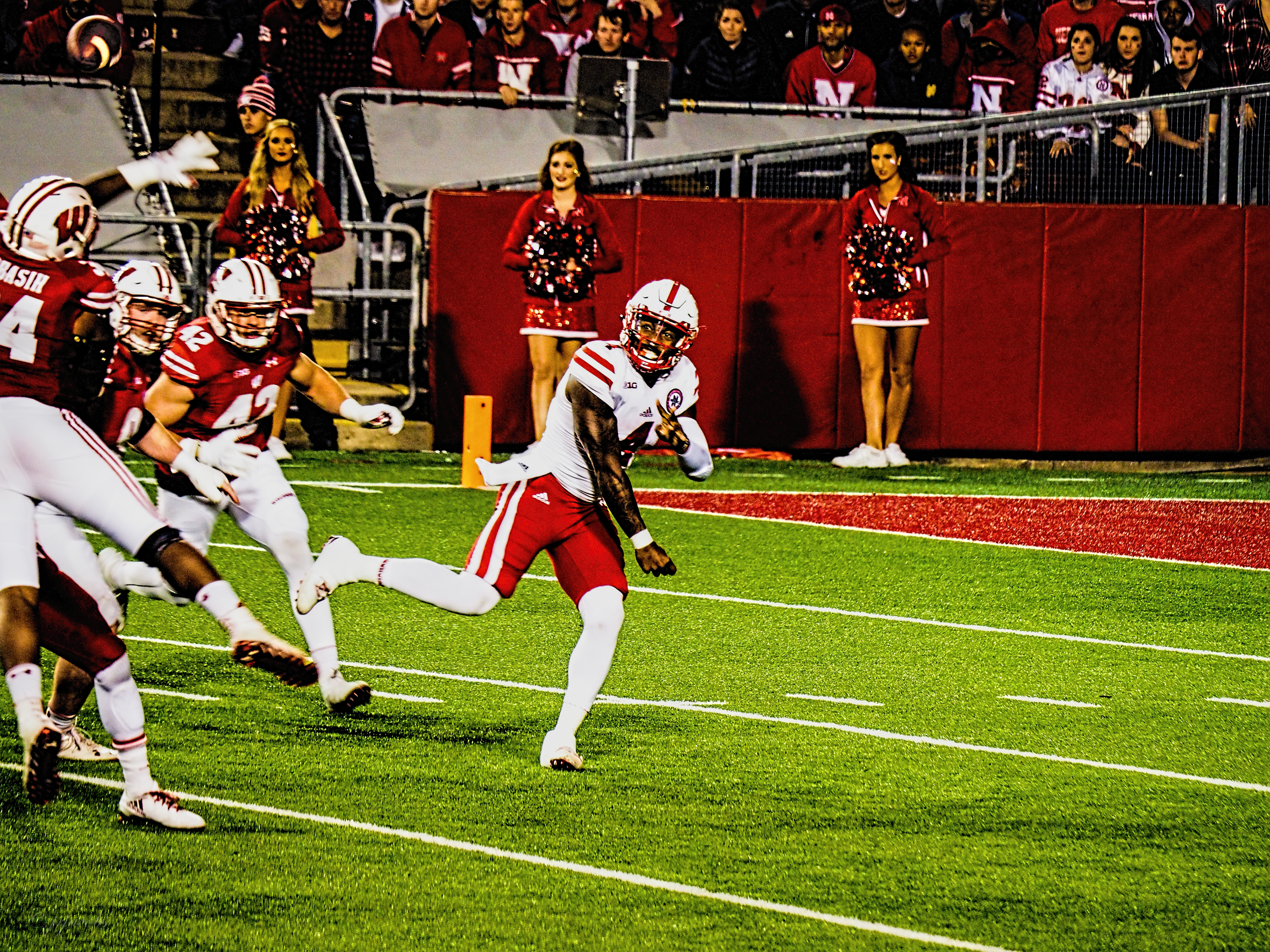
Tommy Armstrong throws the ball during a 2016 game between Nebraska and Wisconsin at Camp Randall Stadium.

The 2016 Nebraska Cornhuskers football team represented the University of Nebraska–Lincoln in the 2016 NCAA Division I FBS football season. The team was coached by second-year head coach Mike Riley and played their home games at Memorial Stadium in Lincoln, Nebraska. They were members of the West Division of the Big Ten Conference. This would be the last winning season for Nebraska until 2024.

== Offseason ==
On July 23, 2016, senior punter and returning starter Sam Foltz was killed in a single-car crash in Waukesha County, Wisconsin following serving as staff for a training camp for high school kickers and punters. Former Michigan State punter Mike Sadler was also killed; LSU kicker Colby Delahoussaye was also in the accident but sustained only non-life-threatening injuries.

=== Transfers ===
==== Outgoing ====
Name	Number	Pos.	Destination
Derrion Grim	#7	WR	San Joaquin Delta
Blake Holtmeier	#25	WR	Nebraska-Kearney
Lane Hovey	#13	WR	Montana
Garrett McKay	#33	LB	Santa Ana College
Trai Mosley	#2	CB	Central Arkansas
Garrett Poppen	#54	LB	Nebraska–Kearney
Jordan Stevenson	#2	RB	Navarro JC
Adrienne Talan	#13	LB	Navarro JC
Kevin Williams	#92	DT	Michigan State (Grad. transfer)
Paul Thurston	#55	C	Colorado State (Grad. transfer)
AJ Bush Jr.	#6	QB	Iowa Western CC

==== Incoming ====
Name	Number	Pos.	Previous School	Year
Tanner Lee*	#13	QB	Tulane	Junior
Donovan McDonald†	#39	WR	Fork Union Military	RS Freshman
Keyan Williams**	#9	WR	Fresno State	Sophomore
Matt Watts†	#51	OL	Nevada; Butte CC	Junior
Tanner Zlab†	#33	DB	Doane	Senior

*Player is not eligible to play in 2016 season due to transfer regulations
**Son of Nebraska WR coach Keith Williams

†Walk-on transfer

=== Coaching departures ===
Name	Pos.	Destination	Replacement
Hank Hughes	DL Coach	unknown	John Parrella

=== 2016 recruiting class ===
==== Position key ====
Back	B	Center	C	Cornerback	CB	Defensive back	DB
Defensive end	DE	Defensive lineman	DL	Defensive tackle	DT	End	E
Fullback	FB	Guard	G	Halfback	HB	Kicker	K
Kickoff returner	KR	Offensive tackle	OT	Offensive lineman	OL	Linebacker	LB
Long snapper	LS	Punter	P	Punt returner	PR	Quarterback	QB
Running back	RB	Safety	S	Tight end	TE	Wide receiver	WR

Nebraska Football 2016 Recruiting Class

College recruiting
Name	Hometown	School	Height	Weight	40^{‡}	Commit date
Quayshon Alexander; LB	Wayne, NJ	De Paul Catholic	6 ft 3 in (1.91 m)	230 lb (100 kg)	–	Jun 19, 2015
Quayshon Alexander; LB	Recruit ratings: Scout: Rivals: 247Sports: ESPN: (80)					
Dicaprio Bootle; CB	Miami, FL	Miami Killian HS	5 ft 10 in (1.78 m)	175 lb (79 kg)	–	Jun 16, 2015
Dicaprio Bootle; CB	Recruit ratings: Scout: Rivals: 247Sports: ESPN: (75)					
Bryan Brokop; OT	New Lenox, IL	Lincoln Way West	6 ft 5 in (1.96 m)	273 lb (124 kg)	–	Sep 27, 2014
Bryan Brokop; OT	Recruit ratings: Scout: Rivals: 247Sports: ESPN: (79)					
Tre Bryant; RB	Saint Louis, MO	Christian Brothers College HS	5 ft 10 in (1.78 m)	198 lb (90 kg)	4.53	Nov 8, 2015
Tre Bryant; RB	Recruit ratings: Scout: Rivals: 247Sports: ESPN: (75)					
Tony Butler; CB	Lakewood, OH	St. Edward	6 ft 2 in (1.88 m)	195 lb (88 kg)	–	Jan 20, 2016
Tony Butler; CB	Recruit ratings: Scout: Rivals: 247Sports: ESPN: (79)					
Marquel Dismuke; S	Calabasas, CA	Calabasas	6 ft 1 in (1.85 m)	180 lb (82 kg)	–	Jun 15, 2015
Marquel Dismuke; S	Recruit ratings: Scout: Rivals: 247Sports: ESPN: (83)					
JoJo Domann; DB	Colorado Springs, CO	Pine Creek	6 ft 1 in (1.85 m)	210 lb (95 kg)	–	Jun 26, 2015
JoJo Domann; DB	Recruit ratings: Scout: Rivals: 247Sports: ESPN: (77)					
David Engelhaupt; TE	Norfolk, NE	Norfolk Catholic	6 ft 4 in (1.93 m)	235 lb (107 kg)	–	Feb 2, 2016
David Engelhaupt; TE	Recruit ratings: Scout: Rivals: 247Sports: ESPN: (N/A)					
Matt Farniok; OT	Sioux Falls, SD	Washington	6 ft 4 in (1.93 m)	297 lb (135 kg)	–	Jan 27, 2016
Matt Farniok; OT	Recruit ratings: Scout: Rivals: 247Sports: ESPN: (81)					
Lamar Jackson; DB	Elk Grove, CA	Franklin	6 ft 3 in (1.91 m)	205.5 lb (93.2 kg)	–	Feb 2, 2016
Lamar Jackson; DB	Recruit ratings: Scout: Rivals: 247Sports: ESPN: (84)					
Pernell Jefferson; LB	New Orleans, LA	Warren Easton	6 ft 2 in (1.88 m)	235 lb (107 kg)	–	Jan 23, 2016
Pernell Jefferson; LB	Recruit ratings: Scout: Rivals: 247Sports: ESPN: (74)					
Caleb Lightbourn; P/PK	Camas, WA	Camas	6 ft 3 in (1.91 m)	214 lb (97 kg)	–	Nov 28, 2015
Caleb Lightbourn; P/PK	Recruit ratings: Scout: Rivals: 247Sports: ESPN: (74)					
Collin Miller; LB	Fishers, IN	Hamilton Southeastern	6 ft 3 in (1.91 m)	225 lb (102 kg)	–	Jan 24, 2016
Collin Miller; LB	Recruit ratings: Scout: Rivals: 247Sports: ESPN: (72)					
Patrick O'Brien; QB	San Juan Capistrano, CA	San Juan Hills	6 ft 4 in (1.93 m)	225 lb (102 kg)	–	May 1, 2015
Patrick O'Brien; QB	Recruit ratings: Scout: Rivals: 247Sports: ESPN: (79)					
John Raridon; OG	West Des Moines, IA	Valley	6 ft 2 in (1.88 m)	258 lb (117 kg)	–	Sep 28, 2015
John Raridon; OG	Recruit ratings: Scout: Rivals: 247Sports: ESPN: (83)					
Greg Simmons; LB	Fort Pierce, FL	Fort Pierce	6 ft 2 in (1.88 m)	225 lb (102 kg)	–	Jun 25, 2015
Greg Simmons; LB	Recruit ratings: Scout: Rivals: 247Sports: ESPN: (79)					
JD Spielman; WR	Eden Prairie, MN	Eden Prairie	5 ft 9 in (1.75 m)	175 lb (79 kg)	–	Aug 15, 2015
JD Spielman; WR	Recruit ratings: Scout: Rivals: 247Sports: ESPN: (78)					
Ben Stille; DL	Ashland, NE	Ashland-Greenwood	6 ft 5 in (1.96 m)	235 lb (107 kg)	–	Jun 13, 2015
Ben Stille; DL	Recruit ratings: Scout: Rivals: 247Sports: ESPN: (76)					
Jack Stoll; TE	Aurora, CO	Regis Jesuit	6 ft 5 in (1.96 m)	225 lb (102 kg)	–	Jun 24, 2015
Jack Stoll; TE	Recruit ratings: Scout: Rivals: 247Sports: ESPN: (79)					
Boe Wilson; OG	Lee's Summit, MO	Lee's Summit	6 ft 3 in (1.91 m)	290 lb (130 kg)	–	Jul 6, 2015
Boe Wilson; OG	Recruit ratings: Scout: Rivals: 247Sports: ESPN: (78)					
Overall recruit ranking: Scout: 28 Rivals: 25 247Sports: 24 ESPN: 26
Note: In many cases, Scout, Rivals, 247Sports, On3, and ESPN may conflict in their listings of height and weight.; In these cases, the average was taken. ESPN grades are on a 100-point scale.; Sources: "2016 Team Ranking". Rivals.com.

==== Walk-on recruits ====
College recruiting
Name	Hometown	School	Height	Weight	Commit date
Chafin, Ty; WR	Burwell, NE	Burwell	6 ft 5 in (1.96 m)	200 lb (91 kg)	
Chafin, Ty; WR	Recruit ratings: Scout: Rivals: 247Sports: ESPN:				
Hamik, Creighton; LB	Kearney, NE	Kearney Catholic	6 ft 3 in (1.91 m)	210 lb (95 kg)	
Hamik, Creighton; LB	Recruit ratings: Scout: Rivals: 247Sports: ESPN:				
Hass, Tanner; ATH	West Point, NE	Guardian Angels	6 ft 0 in (1.83 m)	195 lb (88 kg)	
Hass, Tanner; ATH	Recruit ratings: Scout: Rivals: 247Sports: ESPN:				
Hohenstein, Branden; LB	Jackson, NE	Bishop Heelan	6 ft 4 in (1.93 m)	205 lb (93 kg)	
Hohenstein, Branden; LB	Recruit ratings: Scout: Rivals: 247Sports: ESPN:				
Honas, Todd; WR	Aurora, NE	Aurora	5 ft 11 in (1.80 m)	200 lb (91 kg)	
Honas, Todd; WR	Recruit ratings: Scout: Rivals: 247Sports: ESPN:				
Hunt, Tavlin; LB	Lincoln, NE	North Star	6 ft 0 in (1.83 m)	215 lb (98 kg)	
Hunt, Tavlin; LB	Recruit ratings: Scout: Rivals: 247Sports: ESPN:				
Jordan, Grant; LB	Omaha, NE	Westside	6 ft 2 in (1.88 m)	205 lb (93 kg)	
Jordan, Grant; LB	Recruit ratings: Scout: Rivals: 247Sports: ESPN:				
Jordan, Spencer; FB	Omaha, NE	Westside	6 ft 2 in (1.88 m)	215 lb (98 kg)	
Jordan, Spencer; FB	Recruit ratings: Scout: Rivals: 247Sports: ESPN:				
Kitten, Jake; OL	Santee, CA	Santana	6 ft 2 in (1.88 m)	290 lb (130 kg)	
Kitten, Jake; OL	Recruit ratings: Scout: Rivals: 247Sports: ESPN:				
Lambert, Sean; RB	Fremont, NE	Fremont	6 ft 3 in (1.91 m)	190 lb (86 kg)	
Lambert, Sean; RB	Recruit ratings: Scout: Rivals: 247Sports: ESPN:				
Smith, Ne'Land; WR	Blue Springs, MO	Blue Springs	6 ft 0 in (1.83 m)	200 lb (91 kg)	
Smith, Ne'Land; WR	Recruit ratings: Scout: Rivals: 247Sports: ESPN:				
Sullivan, Eli; DB	Longmont, CO	Longmont	6 ft 2 in (1.88 m)	190 lb (86 kg)	
Sullivan, Eli; DB	Recruit ratings: Scout: Rivals: 247Sports: ESPN:				
Watts, Matt; OL	Stockton, CA	St. Mary's HS; Butte CC; Nevada	6 ft 4 in (1.93 m)	270 lb (120 kg)	
Watts, Matt; OL	Recruit ratings: Scout: Rivals: 247Sports: ESPN:				
Overall recruit ranking:
Note: In many cases, Scout, Rivals, 247Sports, On3, and ESPN may conflict in their listings of height and weight.; In these cases, the average was taken. ESPN grades are on a 100-point scale.; Sources: "2016 Team Ranking". Rivals.com.

National signing day was on Wednesday, February 3, 2016.

==== Tryout walk-ons ====
College recruiting
Name	Hometown	School	Height	Weight	Commit date
Kasun, Kyle; DB	Papillion, NE	Papillion-La Vista South	6 ft 0 in (1.83 m)	180 lb (82 kg)	
Kasun, Kyle; DB	Recruit ratings: Scout: Rivals: 247Sports: ESPN:				
Overall recruit ranking:
Note: In many cases, Scout, Rivals, 247Sports, On3, and ESPN may conflict in their listings of height and weight.; In these cases, the average was taken. ESPN grades are on a 100-point scale.; Sources: "2016 Team Ranking". Rivals.com.

=== Returning starters ===
==== Offense ====
Player	Class	Position
Tommy Armstrong Jr.	Senior	Quarterback
Terrell Newby	Senior	Running back
Jordan Westerkamp	Senior	Wide receiver
Brandon Reilly	Senior	Wide receiver
Cethan Carter	Senior	Tight end
Dylan Utter	Senior	Guard
Nick Gates	Sophomore	Offensive tackle
Ryker Fyfe	Senior	Quarterback
Devine Ozigbo	Sophomore	Running back
De'Mornay Pierson-El	Junior	Wide receiver
Stanley Morgan Jr.	Sophomore	Wide receiver
Sam Cotton	Senior	Tight end

==== Defense ====
Player	Class	Position
Mick Stoltenberg	Sophomore	Defensive tackle
Kevin Maurice	Senior	Defensive tackle
Freedom Akinmoladun	Sophomore	Defensive end
Dedrick Young	Sophomore	Linebacker
Josh Banderas	Senior	Linebacker
Marcus Newby	Junior	Linebacker
Joshua Kalu	Junior	Cornerback
Chris Jones	Junior	Cornerback
Aaron Williams	Sophomore	Strong safety
Nathan Gerry	Senior	Free safety
Ross Dzuris	Senior	Defensive end
Michael Rose-Ivey	Senior	Linebacker
Chris Weber	Junior	Linebacker
Tyrin Ferguson	Sophomore	Linebacker
Luke Gifford	Sophomore	Linebacker
Boaz Joseph	Junior	Cornerback
Kieron Williams	Junior	Free safety
Antonio Reed	Sophomore	Free safety

==== Special teams ====
Player	Class	Position
Drew Brown	Junior	Kicker
Jordan Ober	Sophomore	Long Snapper

=== Spring practice ===
2016 Red—White Spring Game

Team	1	2	3	4	Total
• White	8	8	5	25	46
Red	11	12	10	8	41

- Date: April 16, 2016
- Location: Lincoln, Nebraska
- Game start: 1:06 p.m.
- Elapsed time: 2h 22m
- Game attendance: 72,992
- Game weather: Cloudy w/ 73% humidity, 67 °F (19 °C); wind 11 mph (18 km/h) SSE
- Television network: BTN2Go

Scoring summary
1	Red	Terrell Newby 23-yard run	Red 1–0
1	Red	Devine Ozigbo 22-yard run	Red 2–0
1	Red	Three consecutive first downs	Red 3–0
1	Red	Terrell Newby 1-yard touchdown run (Drew Brown kick)	Red 10–0
1	White	Three and out	Red 10–2
1	White	Stop before 40-yard line (forced punt)	Red 10–3
1	White	Stop before 40-yard line (forced punt)	Red 10–4
1	White	Stop before 40 yard line (forced punt)	Red 10–5
1	White	Three and out	Red 10–7
1	White	Stop before 40-yard line (forced punt)	Red 10–8
1	Red	Fourth down conversion	Red 11–8
2	White	Red team (Drew Brown) missed 50 yard field goal, hit crossbar	Red 11–11
2	Red	Tommy Armstrong Jr. 44-yard run	Red 12–11
2	Red	Mikale Wilbon 6-yard touchdown run (Drew Brown kick)	Red 19–11
2	White	Freedom Akinmoladun and Carlos Davis sack of Ryker Fyfe	Red 19–13
2	White	Stop before 40-yard line (forced punt)	Red 19–14
2	Red	Ryker Fyfe 25-yard pass to Sam Cotton	Red 20–14
2	White	Fourth down stop	Red 20–16
2	Red	Drew Brown 47-yard field goal	Red 23–16
3	Red	Three consecutive first downs	Red 24–16
3	Red	Tommy Armstrong Jr. 37-yard touchdown run	Red 31–16
3	White	Three and out	Red 31–18
3	White	Stop before 40-yard line (forced punt)	Red 31–19
3	Red	Ryker Fyfe 22-yard pass to Wyatt Mazour	Red 32–19
3	White	Fourth down stop	Red 32–21
3	Red	Three consecutive first downs	Red 33–21
4	White	Fourth down stop	Red 33–23
4	White	Joel Lopez sack of Patrick O'Brien	Red 33–25
4	White	Stop before 40-yard line (forced punt)	Red 33–26
4	White	Fourth down stop	Red 33–28
4	White	Fourth down stop	Red 33–30
4	White	Fourth down stop	Red 33–30
4	White	Stop before 40-yard line (forced punt)	Red 33–31
4	White	Three and out	Tied 33–33
4	Red	Fourth down conversion	Red 34–33
4	Red	Austin Rose 23-yard run	Red 35–33
4	Red	Austin Rose 7-yard touchdown run	Red 41–33
4	White	Fourth down stop	Red 41–35
4	White	Three and out	Red 41–38
4	White	Fourth down stop	Red 41–40
4	White	Stop before 40-yard line (forced punt)	Tied 41–41
4	White	Kyle Kasun interception as time expired	White 46–41

72,992 fans attended the Nebraska spring game, continuing the streak of 60,000+ in attendance for Nebraska spring games since 2008. Unlike previous spring games, the teams did not trade the ball but Team Red was the offense and Team White was the defense for the entire game. Additionally, the scrimmage used a unique scoring system that allowed the defense (White) to score and rewarded plays that would otherwise be non-scoring in a normal football game. At the end of the game, Kyle Kasun intercepted the ball as the time expired, allowing the white team to win. The final score was White 46–41. Tommy Armstrong Jr., Ryker Fyfe and Patrick O'Brien all played at quarterback for team Red.

== Schedule ==
Nebraska announced its 2016 football schedule on July 11, 2013. The 2016 schedule consists of 7 home and 5 away games in the regular season. The Cornhuskers will host Big Ten opponents Illinois, Maryland, Minnesota, and Purdue, and will travel to Indiana, Iowa, Northwestern, Ohio State, and Wisconsin.

The team hosted all three of the non–conference games which are against the Fresno State Bulldogs and the Wyoming Cowboys both from the Mountain West Conference, and the Oregon Ducks from the Pac-12 Conference (Pac-12). This was Nebraska's 7th game against Oregon, and head coach Mike Riley's 13th overall game against Oregon, as he previously coached for Oregon rival Oregon State.

Date	Time	Opponent	Rank	Site	TV	Result	Attendance	Source
September 3	7:00 p.m.	Fresno State*		Memorial Stadium; Lincoln, NE	BTN	W 43–10	90,013	
September 10	11:00 a.m.	Wyoming*		Memorial Stadium; Lincoln, NE	ESPN2	W 52–17	89,895	
September 17	2:30 p.m.	No. 22 Oregon*		Memorial Stadium; Lincoln, NE	ABC	W 35–32	90,414	
September 24	6:30 p.m.	at Northwestern	No. 20	Ryan Field; Evanston, IL	BTN	W 24–13	40,284	
October 1	2:30 p.m.	Illinois^{†}	No. 15	Memorial Stadium; Lincoln, NE	ESPN2	W 31–16	90,374	
October 15	2:30 p.m.	at Indiana	No. 10	Memorial Stadium; Bloomington, IN	ABC/ESPN2	W 27–22	48,254	
October 22	2:30 p.m.	Purdue	No. 8	Memorial Stadium; Lincoln, NE	ABC/ESPN2	W 27–14	90,546	
October 29	6:00 p.m.	at No. 11 Wisconsin	No. 7	Camp Randall Stadium; Madison, WI (Freedom Trophy)	ESPN	L 17–23 ^{OT}	80,833	
November 5	7:00 p.m.	at No. 6 Ohio State	No. 10	Ohio Stadium; Columbus, OH	ABC	L 3–62	108,750	
November 12	6:30 p.m.	Minnesota	No. 19	Memorial Stadium; Lincoln, NE ($5 Bits of Broken Chair Trophy)	BTN	W 24–17	90,456	
November 19	11:00 a.m.	Maryland	No. 18	Memorial Stadium; Lincoln, NE	ESPNews	W 28–7	89,704	
November 25	2:30 p.m.	at Iowa	No. 16	Kinnick Stadium; Iowa City, IA (Heroes Game)	ABC	L 10–40	69,814	
December 30	2:30 p.m.	vs. No. 21 Tennessee*		Nissan Stadium; Nashville, TN (Music City Bowl)	ESPN	L 24–38	68,496	
*Non-conference game; ^{†}Homecoming; Rankings from AP Poll and CFP rankings after November 1 released prior to game; All times are in Central time; Source:

== Roster and coaching staff ==
2016 Nebraska Cornhuskers football team roster
Players
Coaches
Offense

Pos.	#	Name	Class
WR	3	Lavan Alston Jr.	RFr
QB	4	Tommy Armstrong Jr.	Sr
WR	33	Christian Bailey	Jr
OL	74	Jalin Barnett	RFr
WR	40	Ty Betka	Sr
OL	61	Bryan Brokop	Fr
RB	18	Tre Bryant	Fr
TE	11	Cethan Carter	Sr
WR	45	Ty Chaffin	Fr
WR	80	Brett Classen	Jr
OL	62	Cole Conrad	So
TE	84	Sam Cotton	Sr
WR	2	Zack Darlington	So
OL	79	Michael Decker	RFr
TE	83	David Engelhaupt	Fr
OL	63	Tanner Farmer	So
OL	71	Matt Farniok	Fr
OL	67	Jerald Foster	So
TE	42	Trey Foster	Sr
QB	17	Ryker Fyfe	Sr
OL	68	Nick Gates	So
OL	65	Christian Gaylord	RFr
WR	7	Derrion Grimm	Fr
OL	73	Sam Hahn	Sr
OL	72	Zach Hannon	Jr
RB	32	Tanner Hass	Fr
FB	49	Austin Hemphill	RFr
TE	47	Branden Hohenstein	Fr
WR	43	Todd Honas	Fr
TE	88	Tyler Hoppes	Jr
RB	41	Noah Johnson	RFr
OL	76	Dwayne Johnson Jr.	Jr
FB	38	Harrison Jordan	Jr
FB	36	Spencer Jordan	Fr
TE	89	Connor Ketter	Jr
FB	30	Bo Kitrell	So
OL	59	Jake Kitten	Fr
OL	77	David Knevel	Jr
RB	24	Sean Lambert	Fr
QB	13	Tanner Lee	Jr
RB	37	Wyatt Mazour	RFr
FB	44	Mitch McCann	Sr
WR	39	Donovan McDonald	RFr
FB	41	Luke McNitt	Jr
WR	82	Alonzo Moore	Sr
WR	8	Stanley Morgan Jr.	So
RB	29	Graham Nabity	Sr
RB	39	Jordan Nelson	Sr
RB	34	Terrell Newby	Sr
QB	12	Patrick O'Brien	Fr
RB	22	Devine Ozigbo	So
OL	54	Robby Painter	Sr
WR	26	Brady Pelzer	So
WR	15	De'Mornay Pierson-El	Jr
WR	81	Gabe Rahn	Jr
OL	50	John Raridon	Fr
WR	87	Brandon Reilly	Sr
WR	83	Bryan Reimers	So
RB	23	Austin Rose	So
WR	48	Ne'Land Smith	Fr
TE	85	Matt Snyder	RFr
WR	10	JD Spielman	Fr
TE	86	Jack Stoll	Fr
RB	28	Adam Taylor	Jr
OL	66	Dylan Utter (C)	Sr
OL	51	Matt Watts	Jr
WR	1	Jordan Westerkamp (C)	Sr
OL	58	Corey Whitaker	Sr
RB	21	Mikale Wilbon	So
WR	9	Keyan Williams	So
OL	56	Boe Wilson	Fr
WR	31	Conor Young	RFr

Defense

Pos.	#	Name	Class
DE	91	Freedom Akinmoladun	So
LB	30	Quayshon Alexander	Fr
S	4	Avery Anderson	RFr
DL	75	Fyn Anderson	RFr
LB	52	Josh Banderas (C)	Sr
LB	7	Mohamed Barry	RFr
DB	23	Dicaprio Bootle	Fr
LB	53	Alex Boryca	So
LB	51	Jared Brugmann	RFr
DB	2	Tony Butler	Fr
LB	59	Brody Cleveland	RFr
LB	26	Thomas Connely	So
DE	22	Alex Davis	RFr
DT	96	Carlos Davis	RFr
DT	94	Khalil Davis	RFr
DB	19	Marquel Dismuke	Fr
S	13	JoJo Domann	Fr
DE	88	Ross Dzuris	Sr
DE	48	Erik Evans	Jr
LB	43	Tyrin Ferguson	So
S	25	Nathan Gerry (C)	Sr
LB	12	Luke Gifford	So
DB	29	Nolan Graham	So
LB	54	Creighton Hamik	Fr
CB	1	Lamar Jackson	Fr
DE	47	Matt Jarzynka	So
LB	32	Pernell Jefferson	Fr
DL	50	Garret Johns	Sr
CB	8	Chris Jones	Jr
LB	40	Grant Jordan	Fr
CB	11	Boaz Joseph	Jr
CB	10	Joshua Kalu	Jr
DB	36	Reid Karel	RFr
DB	14	Kyle Kasun	RFr
DE	17	Sedrick King	So
CB	6	Eric Lee Jr.	RFr
DL	58	Joel Lopez	Jr
DT	55	Kevin Maurice	Sr
DE	98	Collin Miller	Fr
DE	45	A.J. Natter	Jr
DE	9	DaiShon Neal	RFr
LB	3	Marcus Newby	Jr
DT	99	Peyton Newell	So
DE	76	Dylan Owen	So
DT	97	Logan Rath	Sr
S	16	Antonio Reed	So
LB	15	Michael Rose-Ivey	Sr
LB	31	Greg Simmons	Fr
LB	56	Brad Simpson	Sr
DE	95	Ben Stille	Fr
DT	44	Mick Stoltenberg	So
DB	35	Jeremiah Stovall	RFr
DB	28	Eli Sullivan	Fr
LB	49	Chris Weber	Jr
LB	57	Jacob Weinmaster	RFr
S	24	Aaron Williams	So
S	26	Kieron Williams	Jr
LB	5	Dedrick Young II	So
DB	33	Tanner Zlab	Sr

Special teams

Pos.	#	Name	Class
P	98	Isaac Armstrong	RFr
PK	34	Drew Brown	Jr
P/PK	35	Caleb Lightbourn	Fr
PK	95	Spencer Lindsay	Sr
LS	54	Jordan Ober	So
PK	26	Jamie Sutcliffe	Sr
LS	92	Chase Urbach	RFr

Head coach

- Mike Riley
  16th season
  2nd year at Nebraska
  Alma mater: Alabama

Coordinators/assistant coaches

- Danny Langsdorf
  11th season as OC/QB coach
  2nd year at Nebraska
  Alma mater: Linfield
- Mark Banker
  27th season as DC coach
  2nd year at Nebraska
  Alma mater: Springfield
- Bruce Read
  8th season as STC coach
  2nd year at Nebraska
  Alma mater: Portland State
- Trent Bray
  7th season as LB coach
  2nd year at Nebraska
  Alma mater: Oregon State
- Mike Cavanaugh
  28th season as OL coach
  2nd year at Nebraska
  Alma mater: S Conn St
- Reggie Davis
  8th season as RB coach
  2nd year at Nebraska
  Alma mater: Washington
- John Parrella
  4th season as DL coach
  1st year at Nebraska
  Alma mater: Nebraska
- Brian Stewart
  12th season as DB coach
  2nd year at Nebraska
  Alma mater: Northern Arizona
- Keith Williams
  17th season as WR coach
  2nd year at Nebraska
  Alma mater: San Diego State

Legend

- (C) Team captain
- (S) Suspended
- (I) Ineligible
- Injured
- Redshirt

Roster
Last update: August 12, 2016

=== Depth chart ===
Defense

FS
Kieron Williams
Aaron Williams
⋅

OUTSIDE	INSDIE	OUTSIDE
Dedrick Young	Josh Banderas	Marcus Newby; Michael Rose-Ivey
Mohamed Barry	Chris Weber	Luke Gifford
⋅	⋅	⋅

SS
Nate Gerry
Antonio Reed
⋅

CB
Joshua Kalu
Lamar Jackson
Boaz Joseph

DE	DT	DT	DE
Freedom Akinmoladun	Mick Stoltenberg	Kevin Maurice	Ross Dzuirs
A.J Natter	Carlos Davis	Khalil Davis	Alex Davis; Sedrick King
⋅	⋅	⋅	⋅

CB
Chris Jones
Eric Lee
⋅

Offense

WR
Stanley Morgan Jr.
De'Mornay Pierson-El
⋅

WR
Brandon Reilly
Alonzo Moore
Bryan Reimers
⋅

LT	LG	C	RG	RT
Nick Gates	Sam Hahn; Jerald Foster (injured)	Dylan Utter	Tanner Farmer	David Kneval
Christian Gaylord	Jalin Barnett	Michael Decker	Corey Whitacker	Cole Conrad
⋅	⋅	⋅	⋅	⋅

TE
Cethan Carter
Sam Cotton
Trey Foster

WR
Jordan Westerkamp
Gabe Rahn
⋅

QB
Tommy Armstrong
Ryker Fyfe
⋅

Key reserves
FB Luke Mcnitt
FB Harrison Jordan

Special teams
PK Drew Brown
P Caleb Lightbourn
KR Tre Bryant
PR De'mornay Pierson-el
LS Jordan Ober

RB
Terrell Newby
Devine Ozigbo
Tre Bryant
Mikale Wilbon

== Game summaries ==
=== Fresno State ===
Fresno State at Nebraska

Team	1	2	3	4	Total
Fresno State	0	10	0	0	10
• Nebraska	7	7	7	22	43

- Date: September 3
- Location: Memorial Stadium
  Lincoln, NE
- Game start: 7:00 p.m. CDT
- Elapsed time: 3:26
- Game attendance: 90,013
- Game weather: Overcast, 69 °F (21 °C), Wind SSE @ 16 mph (26 km/h)
- Referee: Michael Cannon
- TV announcers (BTN): Joe Beninati, Glen Mason, Damon Benning
- Sources:*Sources:

Scoring summary
1	0:43	Nebraska	Devine Ozigbo 1-yard run (Drew Brown kick)	Nebraska 7–0
2	12:34	Nebraska	Devine Ozigbo 6-yard run (Drew Brown kick)	Nebraska 14–0
2	5:38	Fresno State	Aaron Peck 7-yard pass from Chason Virgil (Kody Kroening kick)	Nebraska 14–7
2	0:00	Fresno State	Kody Kroening 26-yard field goal	Nebraska 14–10
3	9:59	Nebraska	Tommy Armstrong 9-yard run (Drew Brown kick)	Nebraska 21–10
4	14:51	Nebraska	Alonzo Moore 57-yard pass from Tommy Armstrong (Drew Brown kick)	Nebraska 28–10
4	9:50	Nebraska	Tommy Armstrong 4-yard run (Zach Darlington 2-pt rush)	Nebraska 36–10
4	4:20	Nebraska	Tre Bryant 3-yard run (Spencer Lindsay kick)	Nebraska 43–10

Series record	Previous meeting	Previous winner
2–0	September 13, 2014	Nebraska, 55–19

Nebraska opened the 2016 season with a non-conference matchup against Fresno State at Memorial Stadium. The game marked the start of the second season for head coach Mike Riley. The game marked the completion of a three-game series with Fresno State. The Huskers defeated Fresno State in Lincoln 42–29 in 2011 before winning on the road in Fresno 55–19 in 2014. These three games are the only meetings between the Huskers and Bulldogs in program history. Before the game, there was a tribute to the late Nebraska punter Sam Foltz, who was killed in a car crash in July. Before their first punt, the Huskers observed a moment of silence for Foltz by sending only 10 players onto the field with no punter waiting for the snap. A delay of game penalty was called on the Huskers, which the Bulldogs declined.

Fresno State Game starters

Position	Player
Quarterback	Tommy Armstrong
Running Back	Terrell Newby
Wide Receiver	Stanley Morgon
Wide Receiver	Alonzo Moore
Wide Receiver	Jordan Westerkamp
Tight End	Cethan Carter
Left Tackle	David Kneval
Left Guard	Sam Hahn
Center	Dylan Utter
Right Guard	Tanner Farmer
Right Tackle	Nick Gates

Position	Player
Defensive End	Ross Dzuris
Defensive tackle	Kevin Maurice
Defensive tackle	Mick Stoltenberg
Defensive End	Freedom Akinmoladun
Linebacker	Marcus Newby
Linebacker	Josh Banderas
Linebacker	Dedrick Young
Cornerback	Chris Jones
Strong Safety	Kieron Williams
Free Safety	Aaron Williams
Cornerback	Joshua Kalu

=== Wyoming ===
Wyoming at Nebraska

Team	1	2	3	4	Total
Wyoming	0	7	10	0	17
• Nebraska	7	10	7	28	52

- Date: September 10
- Location: Memorial Stadium
  Lincoln, NE
- Game start: 11:00 a.m. CDT
- Elapsed time: 3:25
- Game attendance: 89,895
- Game weather: Clear, Sunny, 62 °F (17 °C), Wind W/NW @ 8 mph (13 km/h)
- Referee: Don Willard
- TV announcers (ESPN2): Anish Shroff, Kelly Stouffer, Paul Carcaterra
- Sources:*Sources:

Scoring summary
1	6:12	Nebraska	Tommy Armstrong 7-yard run (Drew Brown kick)	Nebraska 7–0
2	9:03	Nebraska	Drew Brown 29-yard field goal	Nebraska 10–0
2	5:57	Nebraska	Alonzo Moore 63-yard pass from Tommy Armstrong (Drew Brown kick)	Nebraska 17–0
2	0:08	Wyoming	Tanner Gentry 35-yard pass from Josh Allen (Cooper Rothe kick)	Nebraska 17–7
3	11:08	Wyoming	Cooper Rothe 27-yard field goal	Nebraska 17–10
3	4:48	Nebraska	Kieron Williams 23-yard interception return (Drew Brown kick)	Nebraska 24–10
3	1:35	Wyoming	Brian Hill 1-yard run (Cooper Rothe kick)	Nebraska 24–17
4	13:11	Nebraska	Jordan Westerkamp 34-yard pass from Tommy Armstrong (Drew Brown kick)	Nebraska 31–17
4	12:59	Nebraska	Devine Ozigbo 1-yard run (Drew Brown kick)	Nebraska 38–17
4	7:28	Nebraska	Jordan Westerkamp 9-yard pass from Tommy Armstrong (Drew Brown kick)	Nebraska 45–17
4	5:15	Nebraska	Gabe Rahn 35-yard pass from Ryker Fyfe (Drew Brown kick)	Nebraska 52–17

Series record	Previous meeting	Previous winner
7–0	August 31, 2013	Nebraska, 37–34

The 2016 edition of the Nebraska–Wyoming series marked the 8th meeting between the two neighboring state programs. Nebraska entered the game with a perfect 7–0 all-time record against the Wyoming Cowboys. Senior quarterback Tommy Armstrong Jr. threw three touchdown passes during this matchup, in which he set the record for most career touchdown passes in the Nebraska program history, surpassing Taylor Martinez's previous record of 56. The Cornhuskers defeated the Cowboys 52–17 in front of a crowd of 89,895, the stadium's 349th consecutive sellout.

Wyoming Game starters

Position	Player
Quarterback	Tommy Armstrong
Running Back	Devine Ozigbo
Wide Receiver	Brandon Reilly
Wide Receiver	Alonzo Moore
Wide Receiver	Jordan Westerkamp
Tight End	Cethan Carter
Left Tackle	David Kneval
Left Guard	Sam Hahn
Center	Dylan Utter
Right Guard	Tanner Farmer
Right Tackle	Nick Gates

Position	Player
Defensive End	Ross Dzuris
Defensive tackle	Kevin Maurice
Defensive tackle	Carlos Davis
Defensive End	Freedom Akinmoladun
Linebacker	Marcus Newby
Linebacker	Josh Banderas
Linebacker	Dedrick Young
Cornerback	Chris Jones
Strong Safety	Nate Gerry
Free Safety	Kieron Williams
Cornerback	Joshua Kalu

=== Oregon ===
Oregon at Nebraska

Team	1	2	3	4	Total
#22 Oregon	8	12	6	6	32
• Nebraska	7	7	14	7	35

- Date: September 17
- Location: Memorial Stadium
  Lincoln, NE
- Game start: 2:30 p.m. CDT
- Elapsed time: 3:37
- Game attendance: 90,414
- Game weather: Sunny, Clear, 79 °F (26 °C), Wind NW @ 8 mph (13 km/h)
- Referee: Terry Leyden
- TV announcers (ABC): Bob Wischusen, Brock Huard, Allison Williams
- Sources:*Sources:

Scoring summary
1	8:19	Oregon	James Brooks 20-yard run (Charles Nelson rush)	Oregon 8–0
1	2:05	Nebraska	Jordan Westerkamp 22-yard pass from Tommy Armstrong (Drew Brown kick)	Oregon 8–7
2	5:56	Oregon	James Brooks 2-yard run (Charles Nelson pass failed)	Oregon 14–7
2	2:30	Oregon	Taj Griffin 50-yard run (Charles Nelson rush failed)	Oregon 20–7
2	0:05	Nebraska	Jordan Westerkamp 3-yard pass from Tommy Armstrong (Drew Brown kick)	Oregon 20–14
3	11:48	Nebraska	Bryan Reimers 22-yard pass from Tommy Armstrong (Drew Brown kick)	Nebraska 21–20
3	6:13	Nebraska	Devine Ozigbo 7-yard run (Drew Brown kick)	Nebraska 28–20
3	2:42	Oregon	Kani Benoit 41-yard run (Dakota Prukop pass failed)	Nebraska 28–26
4	10:31	Oregon	James Brooks 1-yard run (Dakota Prukop rush failed)	Oregon 32–28
4	2:29	Nebraska	Tommy Armstrong 34-yard run (Drew Brown kick)	Nebraska 35–32

Series record	Previous meeting	Previous winner
5–1	September 27, 1986	Nebraska, 48–14

Nebraska and Oregon played for the 7th time between the two programs on September 17, 2016, at Memorial Stadium in Lincoln, Nebraska. The Ducks went for the two point conversion after every touchdown, only succeeding once, early in the game. Nebraska went on to win the game 35–32, giving Oregon their first loss of the season, and Nebraska their third win to improve their record to 3–0. Nebraska had 428 total offensive yards the whole game, and the Ducks had 482. The Cornhuskers will travel to Eugene, Oregon in the 2017 season to face the Ducks at Autzen Stadium, game 2 of the home-and-home series between the two programs.

Oregon Game starters

Position	Player
Quarterback	Tommy Armstrong
Running Back	Terrell Newby
Wide Receiver	Stanley Morgon
Wide Receiver	De'mornay Pierson-El
Wide Receiver	Jordan Westerkamp
Tight End	Cethan Carter
Left Tackle	David Kneval
Left Guard	Sam Hahn
Center	Dylan Utter
Right Guard	Tanner Farmer
Right Tackle	Nick Gates

Position	Player
Defensive End	Ross Dzuris
Defensive tackle	Kevin Maurice
Defensive tackle	Carlos Davis
Defensive End	Freedom Akinmoladun
Linebacker	Michael Rose
Linebacker	Josh Banderas
Linebacker	Dedrick Young
Cornerback	Chris Jones
Strong Safety	Nate Gerry
Free Safety	Kieron Williams
Cornerback	Joshua Kalu

=== Northwestern ===
Nebraska at Northwestern

Team	1	2	3	4	Total
• #20 Nebraska	0	10	14	0	24
Northwestern	0	7	6	0	13

- Date: September 24
- Location: Ryan Field
  Evanston, IL
- Game start: 6:30 p.m. CDT
- Elapsed time: 3:09
- Game attendance: 40,284
- Game weather: Clear, 71 °F (22 °C), Wind NE @ 10 mph (16 km/h)
- Referee: Ron Snodgrass
- TV announcers (BTN): Eric Collins, Glen Mason, Michelle McMahon

Scoring summary
2	13:40	Nebraska	Drew Brown 23-yard field goal	Nebraska 3–0
2	9:09	Northwestern	Clayton Thorson 42-yard run (Jack Mitchell kick)	Northwestern 7–3
2	1:41	Nebraska	Terrell Newby 4-yard run (Drew Brown kick)	Nebraska 10–7
3	9:00	Nebraska	Tommy Armstrong 4-yard pass to Cethan Carter (Drew Brown kick)	Nebraska 17–7
3	7:29	Northwestern	Clayton Thorson 24-yard pass to Austin Carr (Jack Mitchell PAT miss)	Nebraska 17–13
3	3:06	Nebraska	Jordan Westerkamp 10-yard run (Drew Brown kick)	Nebraska 24–13

Series record	Previous meeting	Previous winner
6–3	October 24, 2015	Northwestern, 30–28

Nebraska opened conference play with their first road game of the season in Evanston, Illinois against Northwestern. The Cornhuskers won the contest by a score of 24–13. Early in the game, I-back Terrell Newby fumbled the ball at the sideline near the end zone, resulting in a touchback, giving Northwestern the ball. In the second quarter, Northwestern quarterback Clayton Thorson ran the ball 42 yards for a touchdown. Thorson also had a 24-yard touchdown pass to Austin Carr in the 3rd quarter. Nebraska will play the Wildcats at home in 2017 at Memorial Stadium in Lincoln, Nebraska.

Northwestern Game starters

Position	Player
Quarterback	Tommy Armstrong
Running Back	Terrell Newby
Wide Receiver	Stanley Morgan
Wide Receiver	Alonzo Moore
Wide Receiver	Jordan Westerkamp
Tight End	Cethan Carter
Left Tackle	David Kneval
Left Guard	Sam Hahn
Center	Dylan Utter
Right Guard	Tanner Farmer
Right Tackle	Nick Gates

Position	Player
Defensive End	Ross Dzuris
Defensive tackle	Kevin Maurice
Defensive tackle	Carlos Davis
Defensive End	Freedom Akinmoladun
Linebacker	Michael Rose
Linebacker	Dedrick Young
Cornerback	Chris Jones
Nickelback	Aaron Williams
Strong Safety	Nate Gerry
Free Safety	Kieron Williams
Cornerback	Joshua Kalu

=== Illinois ===
Illinois at Nebraska

Team	1	2	3	4	Total
Illinois	0	13	3	0	16
• #15 Nebraska	7	3	0	21	31

- Date: October 1
- Location: Memorial Stadium
  Lincoln, NE
- Game start: 2:30 p.m. CDT
- Elapsed time: 3:05
- Game attendance: 90,374
- Game weather: Overcast, 67 °F (19 °C), Wind East & 4–10 mph (6.4–16.1 km/h)
- Referee: Don Capron
- TV announcers (ESPN2): Dave LaMont, Kelly Stouffer, Paul Carcaterra

Scoring summary
1	8:23	Nebraska	Tommy Armstrong 1-yard run (Drew Brown kick)	Nebraska 7–0
2	10:11	Illinois	Kendrick Foster 31-yard run (Chase McLaughlin kick)	7–7
2	5:59	Nebraska	Drew Brown 29-yard field goal	Nebraska 10–7
2	1:01	Illinois	Chase McLaughlin 24-yard field goal	10–10
2	0:00	Illinois	Chase McLaughlin 43-yard field goal	Illinois 13–10
3	7:40	Illinois	Chase McLaughlin 33-yard field goal	Illinois 16–10
4	11:58	Nebraska	Terrell Newby 3-yard run (Drew Brown kick)	Nebraska 17–16
4	4:32	Nebraska	Trey Foster 6-yard pass from Tommy Armstrong (Drew Brown kick)	Nebraska 24–16
4	2:03	Nebraska	Terrell Newby 63-yard run (Drew Brown kick)	Nebraska 31–16

Series record	Previous meeting	Previous winner
9–3–1	October 3, 2015	Illinois, 14–13

Nebraska played its second conference game at home against the Illinois Fighting Illini on October 1, 2016. Nebraska beat the Illini by a score of 31–16, claiming their 5th win on the season to make the Cornhuskers 5–0.

Illinois Game starters

Position	Player
Quarterback	Tommy Armstrong
Running Back	Terrell Newby
Wide Receiver	Stanley Morgon
Wide Receiver	De'mornay Pierson-El
Wide Receiver	Jordan Westerkamp
Tight End	Cethan Carter
Left Tackle	David Kneval
Left Guard	Sam Hahn
Center	Dylan Utter
Right Guard	Corey Whitaker
Right Tackle	Nick Gates

Position	Player
Defensive End	Ross Dzuris
Defensive tackle	Kevin Maurice
Defensive tackle	Carlos Davis
Defensive End	Freedom Akinmoladun
Linebacker	Michael Rose
Linebacker	Josh Banderas
Linebacker	Dedrick Young
Cornerback	Chris Jones
Strong Safety	Nate Gerry
Free Safety	Kieron Williams
Cornerback	Joshua Kalu

=== Indiana ===
Nebraska at Indiana

Team	1	2	3	4	Total
• #10 Nebraska	17	0	0	10	27
Indiana	0	8	7	7	22

- Date: October 15
- Location: Memorial Stadium
  Bloomington, IN
- Game start: 2:30 p.m. CDT
- Elapsed time: 3:38
- Game attendance: 48,254
- Game weather: Partly Cloudy, 75 °F (24 °C), Wind S/SW @ 12 mph (19 km/h)
- Referee: Jeff Servinski
- TV announcers (ABC/ESPN2): Mike Patrick, Ed Cunningham, Jerry Punch

Scoring summary
1	9:46	Nebraska	Drew Brown 40-yard field goal	Nebraska 3–0
1	4:47	Nebraska	Terrell Newby 4-yard run (Drew Brown kick)	Nebraska 10–0
1	4:33	Nebraska	Chris Jones 33-yard interception return (Drew Brown kick)	Nebraska 17–0
2	12:29	Indiana	Team Safety	Nebraska 17–2
2	7:23	Indiana	Griffin Oakes 36-yard field goal	Nebraska 17–5
2	1:18	Indiana	Griffin Oakes 45-yard field goal	Nebraska 17–8
3	0:00	Indiana	Devine Redding 33-yard run (Griffin Oakes kick))	Nebraska 17–15
4	9:57	Nebraska	Stanley Morgan 72-yard pass from Tommy Armstrong (Drew Brown kick)	Nebraska 24–15
4	8:26	Indiana	Devine Redding 4-yard pass from Richard Lagow (Griffin Oakes kick)	Nebraska 24–22
4	0:45	Nebraska	Drew Brown 39-yard field goal	Nebraska 27–22

Series record	Previous meeting	Previous winner
7–9–3	September 30, 1978	Nebraska, 69–17

Indiana Game starters

Position	Player
Quarterback	Tommy Armstrong
Running Back	Terrell Newby
Wide Receiver	Stanley Morgon
Wide Receiver	De'Mornay Pierson-El
Wide Receiver	Brandon Reilly
Tight End	Sam Cotton
Left Tackle	David Kneval
Left Guard	Sam Hahn
Center	Dylan Utter
Right Guard	Tanner Farmer
Right Tackle	Nick Gates

Position	Player
Defensive End	Ross Dzuris
Defensive tackle	Kevin Maurice
Defensive tackle	Mick Stoltenberg
Defensive End	Freedom Akinmoladun
Linebacker	Michael Rose
Linebacker	Josh Banderas
Linebacker	Dedrick Young
Cornerback	Chris Jones
Strong Safety	Nate Gerry
Free Safety	Kieron Williams
Cornerback	Joshua Kalu

=== Purdue ===
Purdue at Nebraska

Team	1	2	3	4	Total
Purdue	7	7	0	0	14
• #8 Nebraska	10	0	7	10	27

- Date: October 22
- Location: Memorial Stadium
  Lincoln, NE
- Game start: 2:30 p.m. CDT
- Elapsed time: 3:28
- Game attendance: 90,546
- Game weather: Sunny, 73 °F (23 °C), Wind SE @ 13 mph (21 km/h)
- Referee: Jerry McGinn
- TV announcers (ABC/ESPN2): Mike Patrick, Ed Cunningham, Jerry Punch

Scoring summary
1	14:44	Nebraska	Tommy Armstrong 22-yard run (Drew Brown kick)	Nebraska 7–0
1	10:20	Purdue	DeAngelo Yancey 1-yard pass from David Blough (J.D. Dellinger kick)	7–7
1	4:03	Nebraska	Drew Brown 30-yard field goal	Nebraska 10–7
2	10:52	Purdue	DeAngelo Yancey 88-yard pass from David Blough (J.D. Dellinger kick)	Purdue 14–10
3	7:45	Nebraska	De'Mornay Pierson-El 40-yard pass from Tommy Armstrong (Drew Brown kick)	Nebraska 17–14
4	14:05	Nebraska	Alonzo Moore 24-yard run (Drew Brown kick)	Nebraska 24–14
4	11:10	Nebraska	Drew Brown 51-yard field goal	Nebraska 27–14

Series record	Previous meeting	Previous winner
2–2	October 31, 2015	Purdue, 55–45

Purdue Game starters

Position	Player
Quarterback	Tommy Armstrong
Running Back	Terrell Newby
Wide Receiver	Stanley Morgon
Wide Receiver	De'mornay Pierson-El
Wide Receiver	Brandon Reilly
Tight End	Sam Cotton
Left Tackle	David Kneval
Left Guard	Sam Hahn
Center	Dylan Utter
Right Guard	Tanner Farmer
Right Tackle	Nick Gates

Position	Player
Defensive End	Ross Dzuris
Defensive tackle	Kevin Maurice
Defensive tackle	Mick Stoltenberg
Defensive End	Freedom Akinmoladun
Linebacker	Michael Rose
Linebacker	Josh Banderas
Linebacker	Dedrick Young
Cornerback	Chris Jones
Strong Safety	Nate Gerry
Free Safety	Kieron Williams
Cornerback	Joshua Kalu

=== Wisconsin ===
Nebraska at Wisconsin
Freedom Trophy

Team	1	2	3	4	OT	Total
#7 Nebraska	0	7	0	10	0	17
• #11 Wisconsin	7	3	7	0	6	23

- Date: October 29
- Location: Camp Randall Stadium
  Madison, WI
- Game start: 6:00 p.m. CDT
- Elapsed time: 3:20
- Game attendance: 80,833
- Game weather: Partly Cloudy, 61 °F (16 °C), Wind NE @ 7 mph (11 km/h)
- Referee: D. Capron
- TV announcers (ESPN): Joe Tessitore, Todd Blackledge, Holly Rowe

Scoring summary
1	9:38	Wisconsin	Bradrick Shaw 21-yard run (Andrew Endicott kick)	Wisconsin 7–0
2	13:41	Nebraska	Devine Ozigbo 1-yard run (Drew Brown kick)	7–7
2	6:53	Wisconsin	Andrew Endicott 44-yard field goal	Wisconsin 10–7
3	8:17	Wisconsin	Robert Wheelwright 9-yard pass from Alex Hornibrook (Andrew Endicott kick)	Wisconsin 17–7
4	13:45	Nebraska	Tommy Armstrong 2-yard run (Drew Brown kick)	Wisconsin 17–14
4	3:43	Nebraska	Drew Brown 35-yard field goal	17–17
OT	0:00	Wisconsin	Dare Ogunbowale 11-yard run (Andrew Endicott kick failed)	Wisconsin 23–17

Series record	Previous meeting	Previous winner
4–6	October 10, 2015	Wisconsin, 23–21

Nebraska played the Wisconsin Badgers on October 29, 2016, at Camp Randall Stadium in Madison, Wisconsin. The Cornhuskers entered the game ranked at #7 in the AP Poll, while Wisconsin sat not far behind at #11. The game was the 11th game in the series, Wisconsin winning the previous matchup, 23–21 in Lincoln on October 10, 2015. Wisconsin won the game 23–17 in overtime. Wisconsin scored first in overtime, but missed the extra point attempt. Nebraska failed to score after, allowing Wisconsin to win the game. The all-time series record is now 7–4 in Wisconsin's favor.

Wisconsin Game starters

Position	Player
Quarterback	Tommy Armstrong
Running Back	Terrell Newby
Wide Receiver	Brandon Reilly
Wide Receiver	Alonzo Moore
Wide Receiver	Jordan Westerkamp
Tight End	Sam Cotton
Left Tackle	David Kneval
Left Guard	Sam Hahn
Center	Dylan Utter
Right Guard	Tanner Farmer
Right Tackle	Nick Gates

Position	Player
Defensive End	Ross Dzuris
Defensive tackle	Kevin Maurice
Defensive tackle	Mick Stoltenberg
Defensive End	Freedom Akinmoladun
Linebacker	Marcus Newby
Linebacker	Josh Banderas
Linebacker	Dedrick Young
Cornerback	Chris Jones
Strong Safety	Nate Gerry
Free Safety	Aaron Williams
Cornerback	Joshua Kalu

=== Ohio State ===
Nebraska at Ohio State

Team	1	2	3	4	Total
#9 Nebraska	3	0	0	0	3
• #6 Ohio State	14	17	24	7	62

- Date: November 5
- Location: Ohio Stadium
  Columbus, OH
- Game start: 7:00 p.m. CDT
- Elapsed time: 3:34
- Game attendance: 108,750
- Game weather: Clear, 54 °F (12 °C), Wind North @ 3 mph (4.8 km/h)
- Referee: John O'Neill
- TV announcers (ABC): Chris Fowler, Kirk Herbstreit, Samantha Ponder

Scoring summary
1	13:26	Ohio State	Damon Webb 36-yard interception return (Tyler Durbin kick)	Ohio State 7–0
1	7:45	Nebraska	Drew Brown 20-yard field goal	Ohio State 7–3
1	3:16	Ohio State	Terry McLaurin 7-yard pass from J. T. Barrett (Tyler Durbin kick)	Ohio State 14–3
2	12:21	Ohio State	Mike Weber 23-yard run (Tyler Durbin kick)	Ohio State 21–3
2	8:22	Ohio State	Tyler Durbin 28-yard field goal	Ohio State 24–3
2	0:03	Ohio State	Samuel Curtis 1-yard pass from J.T. Barrett (Tyler Durbin kick)	Ohio State 31–3
3	14:48	Ohio State	Samuel Curtis 75-yard pass from J.T. Barrett (Tyler Durbin kick)	Ohio State 38–3
3	10:00	Ohio State	Noah Brown 6-yard pass from J.T. Barrett (Tyler Durbin kick)	Ohio State 45–3
3	1:35	Ohio State	Tyler Durbin 28-yard field goal	Ohio State 48–3
3	0:34	Ohio State	Malik Hooker 48-yard interception return (Tyler Durbin kick)	Ohio State 55–3
4	7:19	Ohio State	Joe Burrow 12-yard run (Tyler Durbin kick)	Ohio State 62–3

Series record	Previous meeting	Previous winner
1–3	October 6, 2012	Ohio State, 63–38

Ohio state Game starters

Position	Player
Quarterback	Tommy Armstrong
Running Back	Terrell Newby
Wide Receiver	Stanley Morgon
Wide Receiver	De'Mornay Pierson-El
Wide Receiver	Jordan Westerkamp
Tight End	Cethan Cater
Left Tackle	Cole Conrad
Left Guard	Sam Hahn
Center	Dylan Utter
Right Guard	Corey Whitacker
Right Tackle	Nick Gates

Position	Player
Defensive End	Ross Dzuris
Defensive tackle	Kevin Maurice
Defensive tackle	Mick Stoltenberg
Defensive End	Freedom Akinmoladun
Linebacker	Michael Rose
Linebacker	Josh Banderas
Cornerback	Chris Jones
Nickeback	Aaron Williams
Strong Safety	Nate Gerry
Free Safety	Kieron Williams
Cornerback	Joshua Kalu

=== Minnesota ===
Minnesota at Nebraska
$5 Bits of Broken Chair Trophy

Team	1	2	3	4	Total
Minnesota	7	10	0	0	17
• #21 Nebraska	3	7	7	7	24

- Date: November 12
- Location: Memorial Stadium
  Lincoln, NE
- Game start: 6:30 p.m. CDT
- Elapsed time: 2:57
- Game attendance: 90,456
- Game weather: Clear, 44 °F (7 °C), Wind S @ 6 mph (9.7 km/h)
- Referee: Jerry McGinn
- TV announcers (BTN): Kevin Kugler, Matt Millen, Lisa Byington

Scoring summary
1	7:27	Minnesota	Rodney Smith 3-yard run (Emmit Carpenter kick)	Minnesota 7–0
1	2:42	Nebraska	Drew Brown 46-yard field goal	Minnesota 7–3
2	13:24	Nebraska	Tre Bryant 35-yard pass from Tommy Armstrong (Drew Brown kick)	Nebraska 10–7
2	4:54	Minnesota	Mitch Leidner 1-yard run (Emmit Carpenter kick)	Minnesota 14–10
2	0:00	Minnesota	Emmit Carpenter 42-yard field goal	Minnesota 17–10
3	9:16	Nebraska	Terrell Newby 31-yard pass from Tommy Armstrong (Drew Brown kick)	17–17
4	7:17	Nebraska	Tommy Armstrong 13-yard run (Drew Brown kick)	Nebraska 24–17

Series record	Previous meeting	Previous winner
23–31–2	October 17, 2015	Nebraska, 48–25

Minnesota Game starters

Position	Player
Quarterback	Tommy Armstrong
Running Back	Terrell Newby
Wide Receiver	Stanley Morgon
Wide Receiver	De'mornay Pierson-El
Wide Receiver	Jordan Westerkamp
Tight End	Cethan Carter
Left Tackle	Cole Conrad
Left Guard	Jerald Foster
Center	Dylan Utter
Right Guard	Tanner Farmer
Right Tackle	Nick Gates

Position	Player
Defensive End	Ross Dzuris
Defensive tackle	Kevin Maurice
Defensive tackle	Mick Stoltenberg
Defensive End	Freedom Akinmoladun
Linebacker	Michael Rose
Linebacker	Josh Banderas
Linebacker	Marcus Newby
Cornerback	Chris Jones
Strong Safety	Nate Gerry
Free Safety	Kieron Williams
Cornerback	Joshua Kalu

=== Maryland ===
Maryland at Nebraska

Team	1	2	3	4	Total
Maryland	0	0	0	7	7
• #19 Nebraska	14	7	7	0	28

- Date: November 19
- Location: Memorial Stadium
  Lincoln, NE
- Game start: 11:00 a.m. CDT
- Elapsed time: 3:06
- Game attendance: 89,704
- Game weather: Sunny, 37 °F (3 °C), Wind WNW @ 7 mph (11 km/h)
- Referee: Mike Cannon
- TV announcers (ESPNEWS): Mike Couzens, Dan Hawkins

Scoring summary
1	9:42	Nebraska	Terrell Newby 8-yard run (Spencer Lindsay kick)	Nebraska 7–0
1	4:28	Nebraska	Terrell Newby 5-yard run (Spencer Lindsay kick)	Nebraska 14–0
2	0:17	Nebraska	Jordan Westerkamp 4-yard pass from Ryker Fyfe (Spencer Lindsay kick)	Nebraska 21–0
3	3:30	Nebraska	Terrell Newby 1-yard run (Spencer Lindsay kick)	Nebraska 28–0
4	12:22	Maryland	D.J. Moore 92-yard pass from Max Bortenschlager (Adam Greene kick)	Nebraska 28–7

Series record	Previous meeting	Previous winner
First meeting

Nebraska went undefeated at home for the first time in 4 years thanks to their win over Maryland.

Maryland Game starters

Position	Player
Quarterback	Ryker Fyfe
Running Back	Terrell Newby
Wide Receiver	Alonzo Moore
Wide Receiver	Brandon Reilly
Wide Receiver	Jordan Westerkamp
Tight End	Cethan Carter
Left Tackle	Cole Conrad
Left Guard	Jerald Foster
Center	Dylan Utter
Right Guard	Tanner Farmer
Right Tackle	Nick Gates

Position	Player
Defensive End	Ross Dzuris
Defensive tackle	Kevin Maurice
Defensive tackle	Mick Stoltenberg
Defensive End	Freedom Akinmoladun
Linebacker	Michael Rose
Linebacker	Josh Banderas
Cornerback	Chris Jones
Nickelback	Aaron Williams
Strong Safety	Nate Gerry
Free Safety	Kieron Williams
Cornerback	Joshua Kalu

=== Iowa ===
Nebraska at Iowa
Heroes Trophy

Team	1	2	3	4	Total
#17 Nebraska	0	3	7	0	10
• Iowa	13	7	6	14	40

- Date: November 25
- Location: Kinnick Stadium
  Iowa City, IA
- Game start: 2:30 p.m. CDT
- Elapsed time: 3:31
- Game attendance: 69,814
- Game weather: 42 °F (6 °C), Overcast, Wind W @ 10 mph (16 km/h)
- Referee: Jeff Servinski
- TV announcers (ABC): Allen Bestwick, Mike Bellotti, Kris Budden

Scoring summary
1	4:55	Iowa	Akrum Wadley 75-yard run (Keith Duncan PAT blocked)	Iowa 6–0
1	3:28	Iowa	Riley McCarron 77-yard pass from C. J. Beathard (Keith Duncan kick)	Iowa 13–0
2	9:57	Nebraska	Drew Brown 35-yard field goal	Iowa 13–3
2	7:49	Iowa	LeShun Daniels 4-yard run (Keith Duncan kick)	Iowa 20–3
3	12:40	Iowa	George Kittle 1-yard pass from C.J. Beathard (C.J. Beathard PAT rush failed)	Iowa 26–3
3	7:47	Nebraska	Stanley Morgan Jr. 13-yard pass from Tommy Armstrong (Drew Brown kick)	Iowa 26–10
4	11:13	Iowa	George Kittle 6-yard pass from C.J. Beathard (Keith Duncan kick)	Iowa 33–10
4	1:55	Iowa	LeShun Daniels 1-yard run (Keith Duncan kick)	Iowa 40–10

Series record	Previous meeting	Previous winner
29–14–3	November 27, 2015	Iowa, 28–20

Iowa Game starters

Position	Player
Quarterback	Tommy Armstrong
Running Back	Terrell Newby
Wide Receiver	Stanley Morgon
Wide Receiver	Brandon Reilly
Wide Receiver	Jordan Westerkamp
Tight End	Cethan Carter
Left Tackle	Cole Conrad
Left Guard	Jerlad Foster
Center	Dylan Utter
Right Guard	Tanner Farmer
Right Tackle	Nick Gates

Position	Player
Defensive End	Ross Dzuris
Defensive tackle	Kevin Maurice
Defensive tackle	Mick Stoltenberg
Defensive End	Freedom Akinmoladun
Linebacker	Michael Rose
Linebacker	Josh Banderas
Linebacker	Marcus Newby
Cornerback	Chris Jones
Strong Safety	Nate Gerry
Free Safety	Aaron Williams
Cornerback	Joshua Kalu

=== Music City Bowl ===
Nebraska vs. Tennessee
Music City Bowl

Team	1	2	3	4	Total
#24 Nebraska	0	7	7	10	24
• Tennessee	0	21	3	14	38

- Date: December 30
- Location: Nissan Stadium
  Nashville, TN
- Game start: 2:30 p.m. CST
- Elapsed time: 3:44
- Game attendance: 68,496
- Game weather: Clear, 46 °F (8 °C), Wind SW @ 5 mph (8.0 km/h)
- Referee: M. Mothershed
- TV announcers (ESPN): Tom Hart, Andre Ware, Cole Cubelic

Scoring summary
2	13:20	Tennessee	John Kelly 28-yard run (Aaron Medley kick)	Tennessee 7–0
2	7:36	Tennessee	Joshua Dobbs 10-yard run (Aaron Medley kick)	Tennessee 14–0
2	1:36	Nebraska	Ryker Fyfe 38-yard pass to Brandon Reilly (Drew Brown kick)	Tennessee 14–7
2	0:09	Tennessee	Joshua Dobbs 2-yard run (Aaron Medley kick)	Tennessee 21–7
3	5:52	Tennessee	Aaron Medley 46-yard field goal	Tennessee 24–7
3	5:26	Nebraska	Ryker Fyfe 9-yard pass to Brandon Reilly (Drew Brown kick)	Tennessee 24–14
4	14:09	Tennessee	Joshua Dobbs 3-yard run (Aaron Medley kick)	Tennessee 31–14
4	12:06	Nebraska	Drew Brown 45-yard field goal	Tennessee 31–17
4	10:02	Nebraska	Ryker Fyfe 9-yard run (Drew Brown kick)	Tennessee 31–24
4	8:45	Tennessee	Joshua Dobbs 59-yard pass to Josh Malone (Aaron Medley kick)	Tennessee 38–24

Overall record	Previous meeting	Previous winner
2–0	January 2, 2000	Nebraska, 31–21

Tennessee Game starters

Position	Player
Quarterback	Ryker Fyfe
Running Back	Terrell Newby
Wide Receiver	Stanley Morgon
Wide Receiver	Brandon Reilly
Wide Receiver	De'mornay Pierson-El
Tight End	Cethan Carter
Left Tackle	Cole Conrad
Left Guard	Jerlad Foster
Center	Dylan Utter
Right Guard	Tanner Farmer
Right Tackle	Nick Gates

Position	Player
Defensive End	Ross Dzuris
Defensive tackle	Kevin Maurice
Defensive tackle	Mick Stoltenberg
Defensive End	Freedom Akinmoladun
Linebacker	Josh Banderas
Linebacker	Dedrick Young
Cornerback	Chris Jones
Nickelback	Lamar Jackson
Strong Safety	Antonio Reed
Free Safety	Kieron/Aaron Williams
Cornerback	Joshua Kalu

== Big Ten awards ==
=== Player of the Week Honors ===
Weekly Awards
Player	Award	Week Awarded	Ref.
Nathan Gerry	Big Ten Defensive Player of the Week	Week 2	
Caleb Lightbourn	Big Ten Freshman of the Week	Week 3	
Tommy Armstrong Jr.	Big Ten Offensive Player of the Week	Week 4	
Tommy Armstrong Jr.	Big Ten Offensive Player of the Week	Week 11	

=== All-Conference awards ===
2016 Big Ten All-Conference Honors

Media All-Big Ten
Position	Player	Team
DB	Nathan Gerry	Second Team
OT	Nick Gates	Third Team
QB	Tommy Armstrong Jr.	Honorable Mention
LB	Josh Banderas	Honorable Mention
K	Drew Brown	Honorable Mention
TE	Cethan Carter	Honorable Mention
DL	Ross Dzuris	Honorable Mention
DB	Chris Jones	Honorable Mention
DL	Kevin Maurice	Honorable Mention
RB	Terrell Newby	Honorable Mention
RS	De'Mornay Pierson-El	Honorable Mention
WR	Jordan Westerkamp	Honorable Mention

Coaches All-Big Ten
Position	Player	Team
WR	Jordan Westerkamp	Third Team
DB	Nathan Gerry	Third Team
QB	Tommy Armstrong Jr.	Honorable Mention
LB	Josh Banderas	Honorable Mention
TE	Cethan Carter	Honorable Mention
DL	Ross Dzuris	Honorable Mention
OT	Nick Gates	Honorable Mention
DB	Chris Jones	Honorable Mention
DL	Kevin Maurice	Honorable Mention
RS	De'Mornay Pierson-El	Honorable Mention

== National awards ==
=== All-America Teams ===
All-America Teams
Position	Player	Team	Selector
DB	Nathan Gerry	First Team	Pro Football Focus
DB	Nathan Gerry	Second Team	USA Today
DB	Nathan Gerry	Third Team	AP
DB	Nathan Gerry	Third Team	FOX
DB	Nathan Gerry	Fourth Team	Athlon

== Team awards ==
2016 Nebraska Football Team Awards

Annual Program Awards
Award	Player
Scout Team Defensive MVP	Pernell Jefferson, Collin Miller
Scout Team Offensive MVP	Tanner Lee, JD Spielman
Scout Team Special Teams MVP	Conor Young
Walk-On of the Year	Sam Hahn
Most Improved Player	Carlos Davis
Newcomer of the Year	Tre Bryant
Pat Clare Award	De'Mornay Pierson-El
Tom Novak Trophy	Tommy Armstrong Jr.
Guy Chamberlin Trophy	Jordan Westerkamp
Cletus Fischer Native Son Award	Josh Banderas, Sam Foltz
Lunch Bucket Award	Brad Simpson
Lifter of the Year	Luke McNitt
Husker Pride Award	Sam Cotton

== NFL draft ==
- Nathan Gerry (S, 5th Round, 184th pick, Philadelphia Eagles)

== Rankings ==
Ranking movements Legend: ██ Increase in ranking ██ Decrease in ranking — = Not ranked RV = Received votes
	Week															
Poll	Pre	1	2	3	4	5	6	7	8	9	10	11	12	13	14	Final
AP	RV	RV	RV	20	15	12	10	8	7	9	21	19	17	23	24	RV
Coaches	RV	RV	RV	20	15	12	9	9	6	10	20	17	15	22	21	RV
CFP	Not released									10	19	18	16	—	—	Not released
