= John Kelly (running back) =

American football player (born 1996)

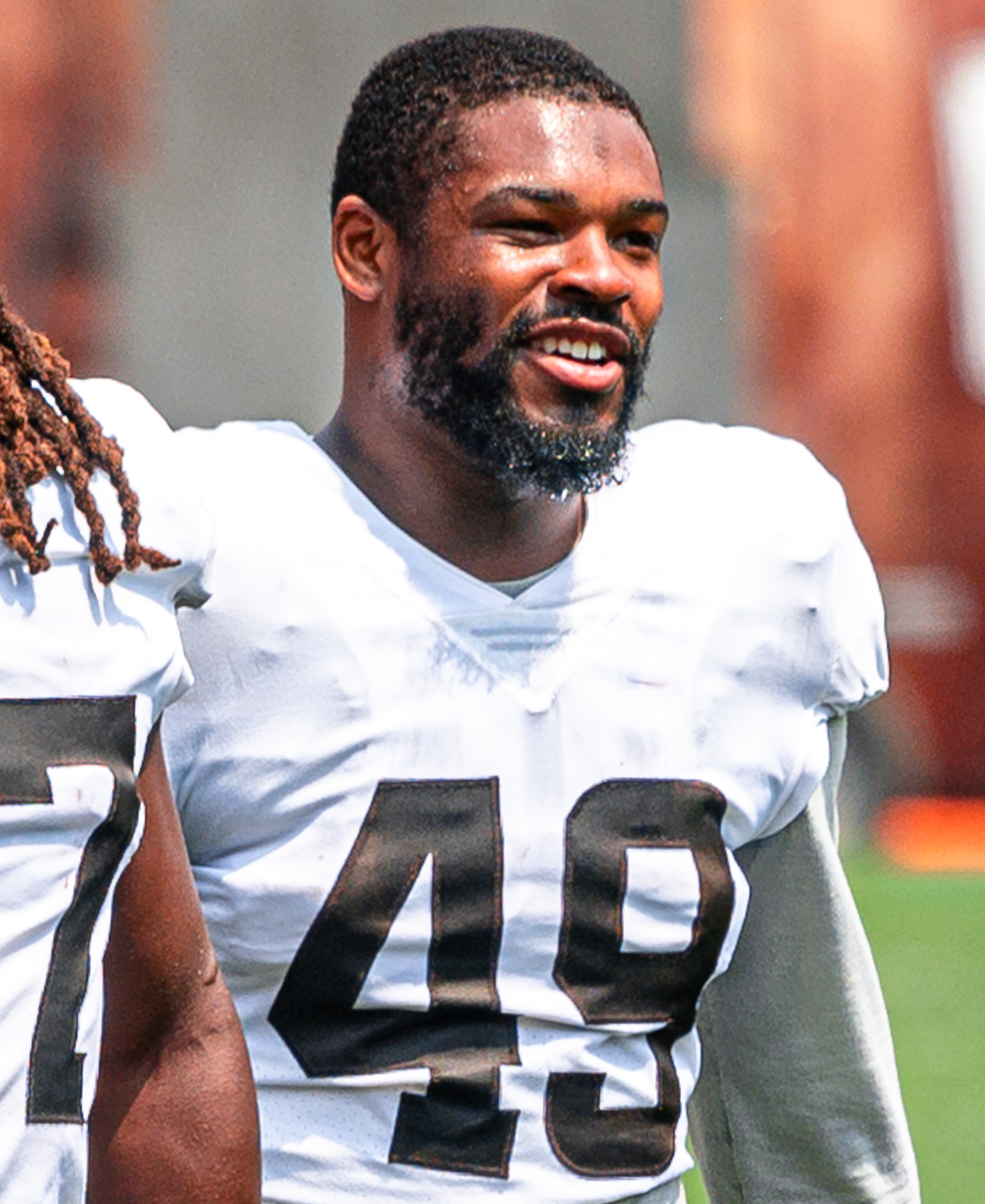
- Kelly with the Cleveland Browns in 2021

Profile
- Position: Running back

Personal information
- Born: October 4, 1996 (age 30); Joliet, Illinois, U.S.
- Listed height: 5 ft 10 in (1.78 m)
- Listed weight: 205 lb (93 kg)

Career information
- High school: Oak Park (Oak Park, Michigan)
- College: Tennessee (2015–2017)
- NFL draft: 2018: 6th round, 176th overall pick

Career history
- Los Angeles Rams (2018–2019); Cleveland Browns (2020–2023); Baltimore Ravens (2024); Los Angeles Chargers (2024)*; Cleveland Browns (2024)
- * Offseason or practice squad member only

Career NFL statistics as of 2024
- Rushing yards: 96
- Rushing average: 3
- Receptions: 2
- Receiving yards: 27
- Stats at Pro Football Reference

John Marshall Kelly Jr. (born October 4, 1996) is an American professional football running back. He played college football for the Tennessee Volunteers.

== Early life ==
Born in Joliet, Illinois, and later moving to Detroit, Michigan at the age of 12, Kelly attended Oak Park High School in Oak Park, Michigan. He played on the football team for head coach Greg Carter. He was a three-year starter for the Knights and contributed on offense as a running back, on defense as a cornerback, and a returner on special teams. As a senior, he recorded 25 touchdowns on offense and 39 tackles on defense. He was named to the Associated Press Michigan All-State Team. Kelly received offers from Tennessee, Michigan, Michigan State, Iowa, Cincinnati, and Maryland among others. Kelly committed to the University of Tennessee to play college football under head coach Butch Jones.

== College career ==
Kelly attended and played college football for the University of Tennessee from 2015 to 2017.

=== Freshman year ===
As a freshman in the 2015 season, Kelly was the third running back behind Jalen Hurd and Alvin Kamara. He saw occasional time in relief and late-game situations. He made his collegiate debut in the season opener against the Bowling Green Falcons. In the 59–30 victory, he had eight carries for 29 yards. After various appearances throughout the season, he scored his first career touchdown, a one-yard rush in the fourth quarter, in the 2016 Outback Bowl in the 45–6 victory over the Northwestern Wildcats. He finished the season with 40 carries for 165 yards and a touchdown.

=== Sophomore year ===
As a sophomore in the 2016 season, Kelly started the season in a similar role to the previous year as Hurd and Kamara both returned. He made his season debut in the 2016 Pilot Flying J Battle at Bristol against Virginia Tech. In the 45–24 victory, he had one carry for four yards and a touchdown. Later on, an opportunity arose for Kelly, as Hurd had some team issues and did not play in the game against Texas A&M. In the game against Texas A&M, Kelly was the second running back behind Kamara. He had 13 carries for 89 yards and a touchdown in the double overtime loss. After a quiet game against Alabama, he had 14 carries for 94 yards in a loss against South Carolina. After the loss, Hurd quit the team and Kelly firmly took the role as the second running back. In the game against Tennessee Tech, he had seven carries for 104 yards and a touchdown. After some solid performances to close the regular season, he had 15 carries for 70 yards and a touchdown in the victory over Nebraska in the 2016 Music City Bowl. Overall, in his sophomore season, Kelly had 98 carries for 630 yards and five touchdowns.

=== Junior year ===
With Kamara entering the 2017 NFL draft, Kelly returned as the main running back for the Volunteers for the 2017 season. Kelly started the season sharing the backfield with Ty Chandler and Carlin Fils-Aime. In the season opener against Georgia Tech at Mercedes-Benz Stadium, Kelly had a career day in Tennessee's 42–41 double overtime victory. In the game, he had 19 carries for 128 yards and four rushing touchdowns and five receptions for 35 yards. In the 26–20 loss to Florida Gators, he had 19 carries for 141 yards and a rushing touchdown. In addition, he had six receptions for 96 yards in the game. On September 23, against Massachusetts, he had 25 carries for 101 yards and a touchdown. On September 30, against Georgia, he had 44 rushing yards and 47 receiving yards in the 41–0 loss. On November 4, he recorded 20 carries for 79 yards and two touchdowns against Southern Miss. On November 18, against LSU, he had 25 carries for 47 yards, three receptions for 31 yards, and threw a 10-yard pass in the 30–10 loss. In his final collegiate game, a 42–24 loss to Vanderbilt, he had 10 carries for 20 yards and a rushing touchdown. Overall, he finished the 2017 season with 778 rushing yards, nine rushing touchdowns, 37 receptions, and 299 receiving yards. On December 29, 2017, Kelly declared his intentions to enter the 2018 NFL draft.

=== Statistics ===
Season	Team	Conf	Class	Pos	GP	Rushing				Receiving			
Season	Team	Conf	Class	Pos	GP	Att	Yds	Avg	TD	Rec	Yds	Avg	TD
2015	Tennessee	SEC	FR	RB	7	40	165	4.1	1	0	0	0.0	0
2016	Tennessee	SEC	SO	RB	11	98	630	6.4	5	6	51	8.5	0
2017	Tennessee	SEC	JR	RB	11	189	778	4.1	9	37	299	8.1	0
Career					29	327	1,573	4.8	15	43	350	8.1	0

== Professional career ==
Pre-draft measurables
Height	Weight	Arm length	Hand span	40-yard dash	10-yard split	20-yard split	20-yard shuttle	Three-cone drill	Vertical jump	Broad jump	Bench press
5 ft 9 7/8 in (1.77 m)	216 lb (98 kg)	31 3/8 in (0.80 m)	9 3/8 in (0.24 m)	4.64 s	1.58 s	2.69 s	4.51 s	7.13 s	35.0 in (0.89 m)	10 ft 0 in (3.05 m)	15 reps
All values from NFL Combine/Pro Day

=== Los Angeles Rams ===
Kelly was drafted by the Los Angeles Rams in the sixth round (176th overall) of the 2018 NFL Draft. He was selected by the Rams through a pick that was previously acquired from the New York Giants in exchange for Alec Ogletree. He signed a four-year contract on June 9, 2018. He joined a running backs unit of Todd Gurley and Malcolm Brown. During the game against the Detroit Lions in Week 13, Brown suffered a clavicle injury, giving Kelly the opportunity for playing time. He made his NFL debut on special teams against the Chicago Bears in Week 14, playing seven snaps. In the following game, against the Philadelphia Eagles, he recorded his first professional carries with two for four yards. With Gurley sitting out Week 16, Kelly recorded 10 carries for 40 yards and had a nine-yard reception against the Arizona Cardinals in Week 16. Gurley again was inactive for Week 17 against the San Francisco 49ers, giving Kelly the opportunity to have 15 carries for 30 rushing yards and a 18-yard reception. In the Divisional Round against the Dallas Cowboys, he had a special teams tackle in his playoff debut. He saw playing time on special teams in the NFC Championship Game and Super Bowl LIII. Overall, in his rookie year, he finished with 74 rushing yards.

Kelly was waived during final roster cuts on August 31, 2019, but was re–signed the next day to the Rams' practice squad. He was promoted to the active roster on October 12. Kelly was waived on November 16, and subsequently re-signed to the practice squad. He was promoted back to the active roster on December 28. He was waived on September 4, 2020.

=== Cleveland Browns (first stint) ===
Kelly was signed by the Cleveland Browns' to their practice squad on September 9, 2020. He was released on December 15, but re-signed to the practice squad the next day.

The Browns signed Kelly to a reserve/futures contract on January 19, 2021. Kelly was waived by the Browns on August 31. Kelly was re-signed to the Browns' practice squad on September 1. He was promoted to the active roster on October 19. He was waived on November 20 and re-signed to the practice squad.

The Browns signed Kelly to a reserve/futures contract on January 19, 2022. The Browns terminated Kelly's contract on August 30. The Browns re–signed Kelly to their practice squad on August 31. He signed a reserve/future contract on January 9, 2023. He was waived by the Browns as a part of final roster cuts on August 29. He was re-signed to the practice squad on October 27. Kelly was released on November 21 and re-signed on November 28. He signed a reserve/future contract with the Browns on January 15, 2024.

Kelly was released by the Browns on August 12, 2024.

=== Baltimore Ravens ===
On August 13, 2024, Kelly signed with the Baltimore Ravens. He was released on August 27, and re-signed to the practice squad. Kelly was called up to play in two games for the Ravens. He played zero offensive snaps, but had two kick returns for 46 yards. Kelly was released on October 1.

=== Los Angeles Chargers ===
On December 2, 2024, Kelly signed with the Los Angeles Chargers' practice squad.

=== Cleveland Browns (second stint) ===
On December 31, 2024, the Cleveland Browns signed Kelly to their active roster.
