= Chris Payton-Jones =

American football player (1995–2026)

- Payton-Jones with the Tennessee Titans

No. 3, 5, 25, 41, 26, 23, 36
- Position: Cornerback

Personal information
- Born: August 13, 1995; Jacksonville, Florida, U.S.
- Died: April 11, 2026 (aged 30); Gainesville, Florida, U.S.
- Listed height: 6 ft 0 in (1.83 m)
- Listed weight: 200 lb (91 kg)

Career information
- High school: Sandalwood (Jacksonville)
- College: Nebraska (2014–2017)
- NFL draft: 2018: undrafted

Career history
- Detroit Lions (2018)*; Arizona Cardinals (2018–2020); Detroit Lions (2020); Minnesota Vikings (2020); Tennessee Titans (2021); Las Vegas Raiders (2022)*; Seattle Sea Dragons (2023); St. Louis Battlehawks (2024–2025)
- * Offseason or practice squad member only

Career NFL statistics
- Total tackles: 48
- Pass deflections: 7
- Stats at Pro Football Reference

Chris Payton-Jones (August 13, 1995 – April 11, 2026) was an American professional football player who was a cornerback in the National Football League (NFL) and United Football League (UFL). He played college football for the Nebraska Cornhuskers.

== College career ==
Payton-Jones started 26 games for the Cornhuskers over the course of four seasons at the University of Nebraska–Lincoln. As a junior, he had 3 interceptions, 10 pass breakups, and 37 tackles (including three for loss), and one sack and was named All-Big Ten honorable mention. Payton-Jones missed the first half of his senior season due to a knee injury, but returned to the field to start the Cornhuskers' last six games.

=== College statistics ===
Year	Team	G	GS	Tackles					Interceptions			
Year	Team	G	GS	Solo	Ast	Tot	Sacks	Sacks-Yards	Int	PD	FF	FR
2014	Nebraska	6	0	5	2	7	0	0	0	0	0	1
2015	Nebraska	13	7	21	4	25	1	1–0	3	5	1	0
2016	Nebraska	13	13	33	4	37	1	1–0	3	10	0	0
2017	Nebraska	5	5	6	1	7	0	0	0	1	0	0

== Professional career ==
Pre-draft measurables
Height	Weight	Arm length	Hand span	Wingspan	40-yard dash	10-yard split	20-yard split	20-yard shuttle	Three-cone drill	Vertical jump	Broad jump	Bench press
5 ft 11 7/8 in (1.83 m)	200 lb (91 kg)	32 3/4 in (0.83 m)	9 3/4 in (0.25 m)	6 ft 6 1/4 in (1.99 m)	4.53 s	1.57 s	2.65 s	4.28 s	6.96 s	34.5 in (0.88 m)	10 ft 1 in (3.07 m)	14 reps
All values from NFL Combine/Pro Day

=== Detroit Lions (first stint) ===
Payton-Jones signed with the Detroit Lions as an undrafted free agent on April 28, 2018. Payton-Jones failed to make the Lions' 53-man roster at the end of training camp and was waived by the team on September 1.

=== Arizona Cardinals ===
On September 3, 2018, Payton-Jones was signed to the Arizona Cardinals' practice squad. Payton-Jones was promoted to the Cardinals' active roster on November 20, and made his NFL debut on November 25, against the Los Angeles Chargers. He was waived on November 27, and re-signed to the team's practice squad two days later. Payton-Jones was promoted to the active roster on December 18.

Payton-Jones made his first career start on September 22, 2019, against the Carolina Panthers. Payton-Jones was waived by the Cardinals on October 9, and was re-signed to the team's practice squad. On November 8, Payton-Jones was again promoted to the active roster.

On September 5, 2020, Payton-Jones was waived during the final roster cuts. He was re-signed to the practice squad a day later.

=== Detroit Lions (second stint) ===
On September 16, 2020, Payton-Jones was signed by the Detroit Lions off the Cardinals practice squad. He was waived by the Lions on October 17. Payton-Jones was re-signed by the team on October 21, but was waived again on October 24.

=== Minnesota Vikings ===
Payton-Jones was claimed off waivers by the Minnesota Vikings on October 26, 2020.

=== Tennessee Titans ===
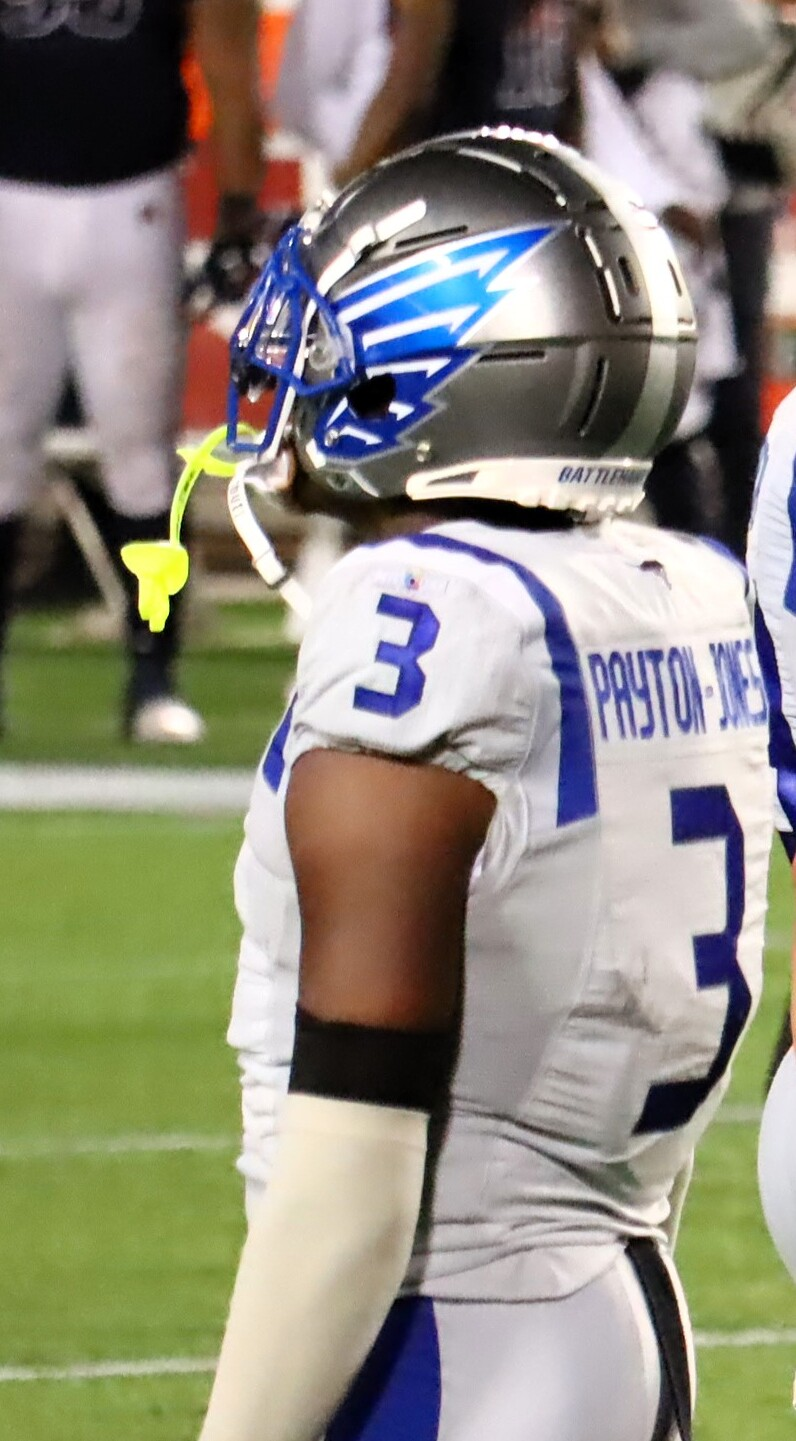
Payton-Jones with the St. Louis Battlehawks in 2025

Payton-Jones signed with the Tennessee Titans on April 23, 2021. He was released on September 6, and was re-signed to the team's practice squad. Payton-Jones was promoted to the active roster on November 10. He was waived by Tennessee on January 4, 2022, and was re-signed to the practice squad.

=== Las Vegas Raiders ===
Payton-Jones signed as a free agent with the Las Vegas Raiders on June 13, 2022. He was released by the Raiders on August 23.

=== Seattle Sea Dragons ===
On November 17, 2022, Payton-Jones was drafted by the Seattle Sea Dragons of the XFL. The Sea Dragons folded when the XFL and USFL merged to create the United Football League (UFL).

=== St. Louis Battlehawks ===
On January 5, 2024, Payton-Jones was selected by the St. Louis Battlehawks during the 2024 UFL dispersal draft. He signed with the team on January 29. Payton-Jones re-signed with the team on August 26. He was placed on injured reserve on May 20, 2025.

Payton-Jones announced his retirement from pro football in January 2026.

== Death ==
On April 11, 2026, Payton-Jones died in a car crash in Gainesville, Florida. He was 30 years old.

== See also ==
- List of gridiron football players who died during their careers
