= Joshua Kalu =

American football player (born 1995)

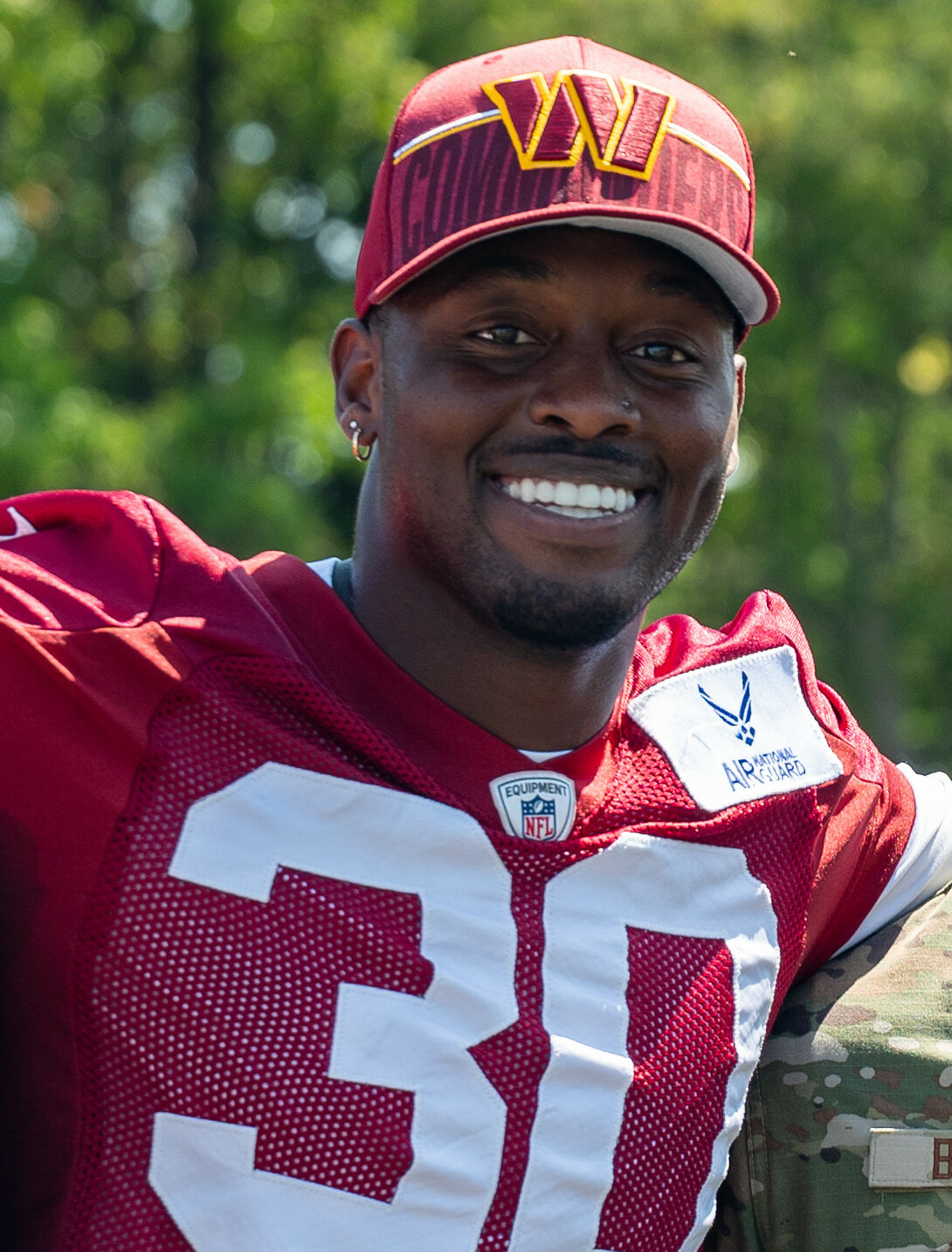
- Kalu with the Washington Commanders in 2023

No. 46, 28
- Position: Safety

Personal information
- Born: August 28, 1995 (age 31); Houston, Texas, U.S.
- Listed height: 6 ft 0 in (1.83 m)
- Listed weight: 203 lb (92 kg)

Career information
- High school: Alief Taylor (Houston)
- College: Nebraska (2014–2017)
- NFL draft: 2018: undrafted

Career history
- Tennessee Titans (2018–2020); New York Giants (2021); Tennessee Titans (2022); Washington Commanders (2023)*; Miami Dolphins (2023)*; Washington Commanders (2023)*
- * Offseason or practice squad member only

Career NFL statistics
- Total tackles: 68
- Forced fumbles: 2
- Pass deflections: 6
- Interceptions: 1
- Stats at Pro Football Reference

Joshua Elekwachi Kalu (born August 28, 1995) is an American former professional football player who was a safety in the National Football League (NFL). He played college football for the Nebraska Cornhuskers and signed with the Tennessee Titans as an undrafted free agent in 2018. Kalu was also a member of the New York Giants, Washington Commanders, and Miami Dolphins.

== Early life ==
Kalu was born on August 28, 1995, in Houston, Texas. He attended Alief Taylor High School in Alief, Texas, where he played football at the safety position. He is of Nigerian descent.

== College career ==
Kalu played as a defensive back for the Nebraska Cornhuskers football team for four years from 2014 to 2017. He appeared in a total of 46 games for Nebraska, missing only three games as a senior due to injury. He compiled seven interceptions and 215 tackles. In 2017, Nebraska's coaching staff moved him from the cornerback to the safety position. During his recruitment and playing career with Nebraska, he had six separate position coaches due to repeated staff turnover.

=== College statistics ===
Year	G	Solo	Ast	Tot	Sacks	Int	PD	FF	FR
2014	12	20	7	27	1	1	3	1	2
2015	13	51	24	75	1	3	7	0	0
2016	13	48	18	66	1	1	11	0	0
2017	9	34	13	47	0	2	6	0	1

== Professional career ==
Pre-draft measurables
Height	Weight	Arm length	Hand span	40-yard dash	10-yard split	20-yard split	20-yard shuttle	Three-cone drill	Vertical jump	Broad jump	Bench press
6 ft 0 1/4 in (1.84 m)	203 lb (92 kg)	32 3/4 in (0.83 m)	10 in (0.25 m)	4.58 s	1.60 s	2.64 s	4.25 s	6.74 s	41.5 in (1.05 m)	11 ft 2 in (3.40 m)	17 reps
All values from NFL Combine/Pro Day

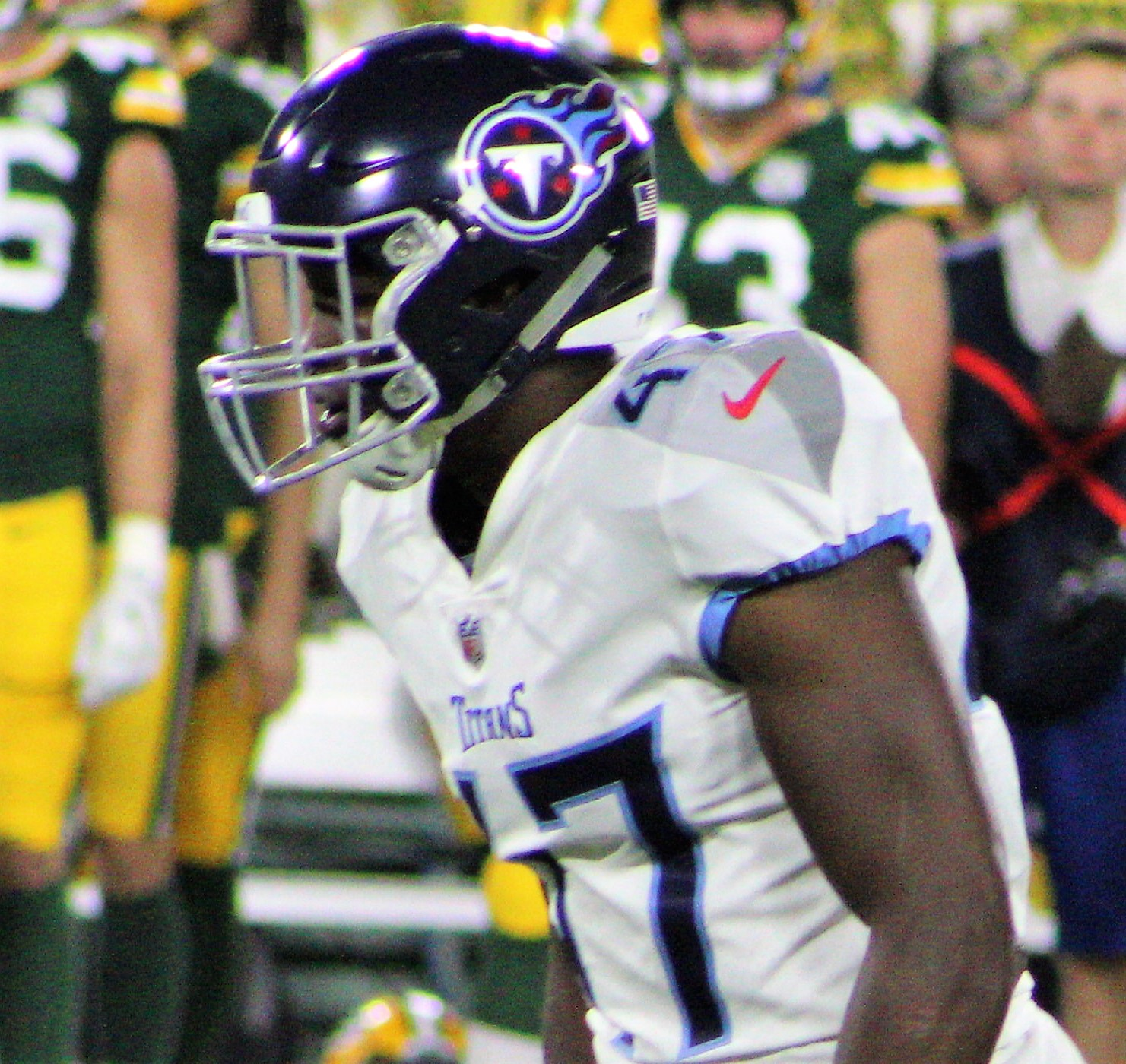
Kalu as a rookie with the Titans, 2018

=== Tennessee Titans ===
On May 11, 2018, the Tennessee Titans signed Kalu as an undrafted free agent. On August 12, Kalu was released by the Titans, but was re-signed eight days later. He was waived on September 1 and was re-signed to the practice squad the next day. He was promoted to the active roster on December 1. Kalu mainly played on special teams and finished the season with 4 tackles.

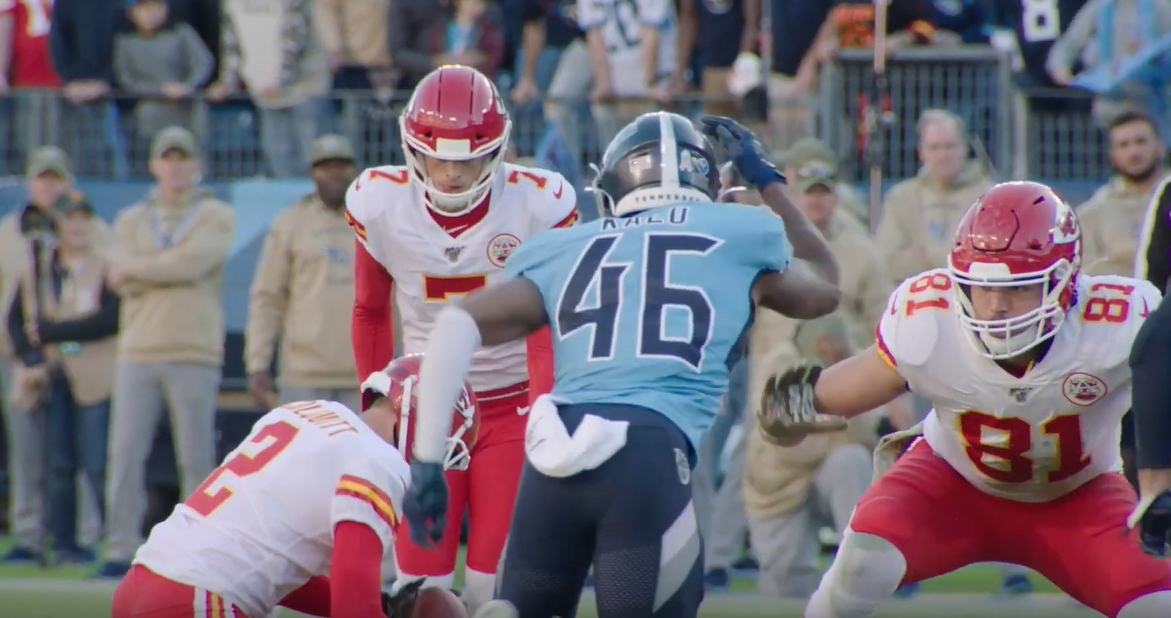
Kalu prior to blocking a field goal in a game against the Kansas City Chiefs

On September 2, 2019, Kalu was placed on injured reserve. He was designated for return from injured reserve on October 30, and began practicing with the team again. He was added to the 53-man roster on November 2. On November 10, in Week 10, Kalu blocked a game-tying field goal against the Kansas City Chiefs in a 35-32 upset victory. Kalu finished the 2019 regular season with six tackles and one pass defense.

Kalu finished the 2020 regular season with a career-high 16 tackles.

=== New York Giants ===
On March 30, 2021, Kalu signed a contract with the New York Giants. In his first preseason game with the Giants, Kalu suffered a torn pectoral muscle and was placed on season-ending injured reserve.

=== Tennessee Titans (second stint) ===
On July 23, 2022, Kalu signed with the Titans. In Week 15 against the Los Angeles Chargers, Kalu intercepted Justin Herbert for his first career interception. Herbert's pass was first caught by Roger McCreary, who tossed the ball to Kalu before he fell out of bounds.

=== Washington Commanders (first stint) ===
On August 8, 2023, Kalu signed with the Washington Commanders. On August 28, he was released as part of final roster cuts before the start of 2023 season.

=== Miami Dolphins ===
On August 30, 2023, Kalu signed with the Miami Dolphins practice squad. He was released on September 19.

=== Washington Commanders (second stint) ===
On October 10, 2023, the Commanders signed Kalu to their practice squad. He became a free agent when his practice squad contract expired after the season.

== NFL career statistics ==
=== Regular season ===
Year	Team	Games		Tackles				Interceptions						Fumbles	
Year	Team	GP	GS	Comb	Solo	Ast	Sack	PD	Int	Yds	Avg	Lng	TD	FF	FR
2018	TEN	5	0	4	4	0	0.0	0	0	0	0.0	0	0	0	0
2019	TEN	8	0	6	6	0	0.0	1	0	0	0.0	0	0	0	0
2020	TEN	15	0	16	12	4	0.0	0	0	0	0.0	0	0	1	0
2022	TEN	16	5	42	24	18	0.0	5	1	0	0.0	0	0	1	0
Career		44	5	68	46	22	0.0	6	1	0	0.0	0	0	2	0

=== Postseason ===
Year	Team	Games		Tackles				Interceptions						Fumbles	
Year	Team	GP	GS	Comb	Solo	Ast	Sack	PD	Int	Yds	Avg	Lng	TD	FF	FR
2019	TEN	3	0	0	0	0	0.0	0	0	0	0.0	0	0	0	1
Career		3	0	0	0	0	0.0	0	0	0	0.0	0	0	0	1
