= Jordan Westerkamp =

American gridiron football player (born 1994)

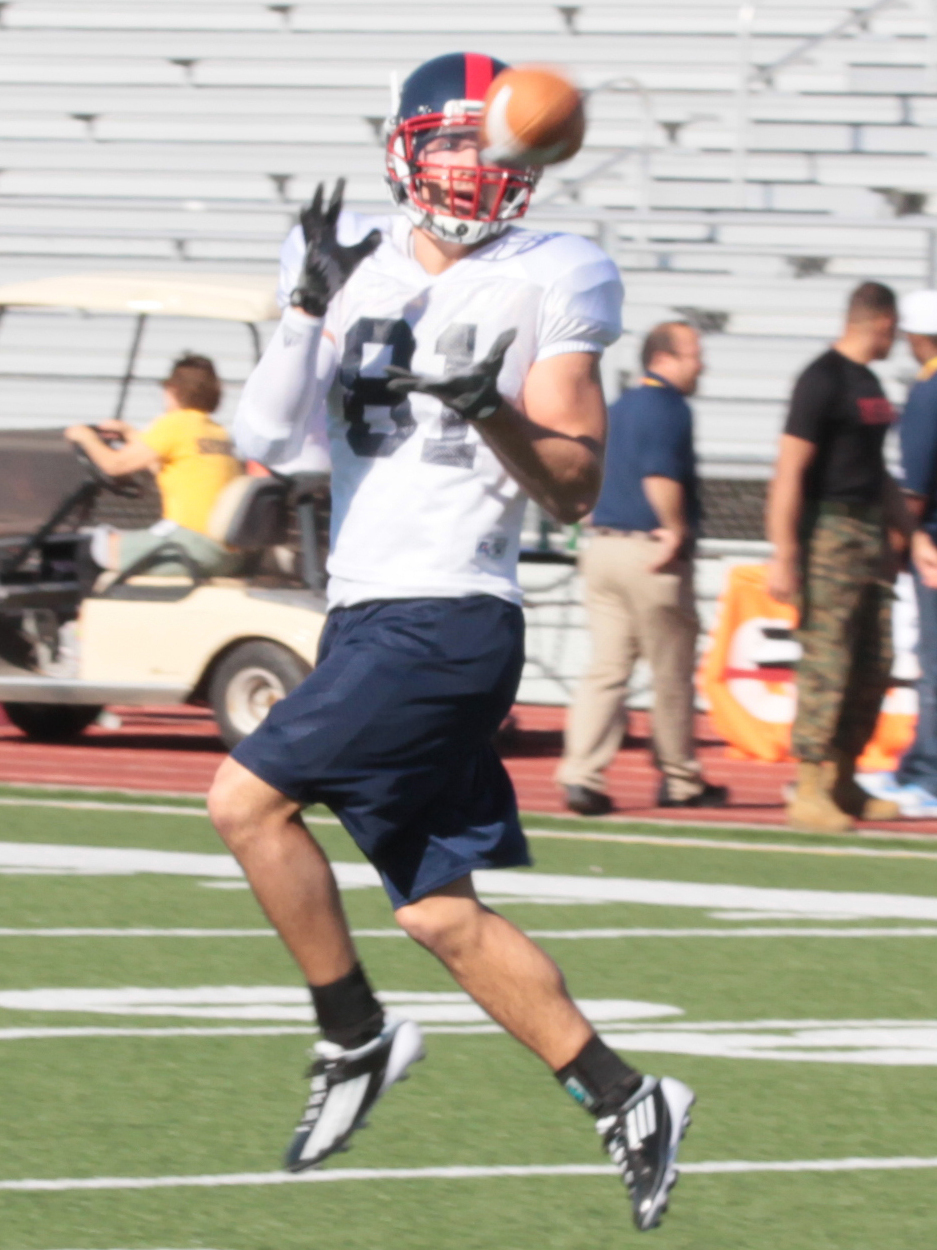
- Westerkamp in 2011

No. 7, 1, 81, 10
- Position: Wide receiver

Personal information
- Born: June 23, 1994 (age 32); Lombard, Illinois, U.S.
- Listed height: 6 ft 0 in (1.83 m)
- Listed weight: 195 lb (88 kg)

Career information
- High school: Montini Catholic (Lombard)
- College: Nebraska
- NFL draft: 2017: undrafted

Career history
- Miami Dolphins (2017)*; Toronto Argonauts (2018)*; Atlanta Legends (2019)*; DC Defenders (2020)*
- * Offseason or practice squad member only

Awards and highlights
- Second-team All-Big Ten (2015); Third-team All-Big Ten (2016)
- Stats at Pro Football Reference

Jordan Westerkamp (born June 23, 1994) is an American former college football player who was a wide receiver for the Nebraska Cornhuskers.

== College career ==
Westerkamp played college football for Nebraska, where he played from 2012 to 2016. He gained 747 receiving yards as a redshirt sophomore in 2014. In 2015, as a redshirt junior, he amassed 918 yards. He was selected by both the coaches and media as a second-team player on the 2015 All-Big Ten Conference football team. On November 30, 2016, Westerkamp was named Third-team All-Big Ten by the coaches and media. His most remembered highlights were a behind-the-back reception from Tommy Armstrong against Florida Atlantic in 2014 & a Hail Mary touchdown catch from Ron Kellogg III against Northwestern in 2013.

== Professional career ==
Westerkamp was signed as an undrafted free agent the Miami Dolphins on July 30, 2017. He was waived with an injury settlement on August 15, 2017. In February 2018, Westerkamp was signed as an international player by the Toronto Argonauts of the CFL. Westerkamp signed with the inaugural AAF Atlanta Legends in December 2018, but he failed to make the final roster.

Westerkamp signed with the DC Defenders of the XFL during mini-camp in December 2019. He was waived during final roster cuts on January 22, 2020.
