= Drew Brown (Canadian football) =

American gridiron football player (born 1995)

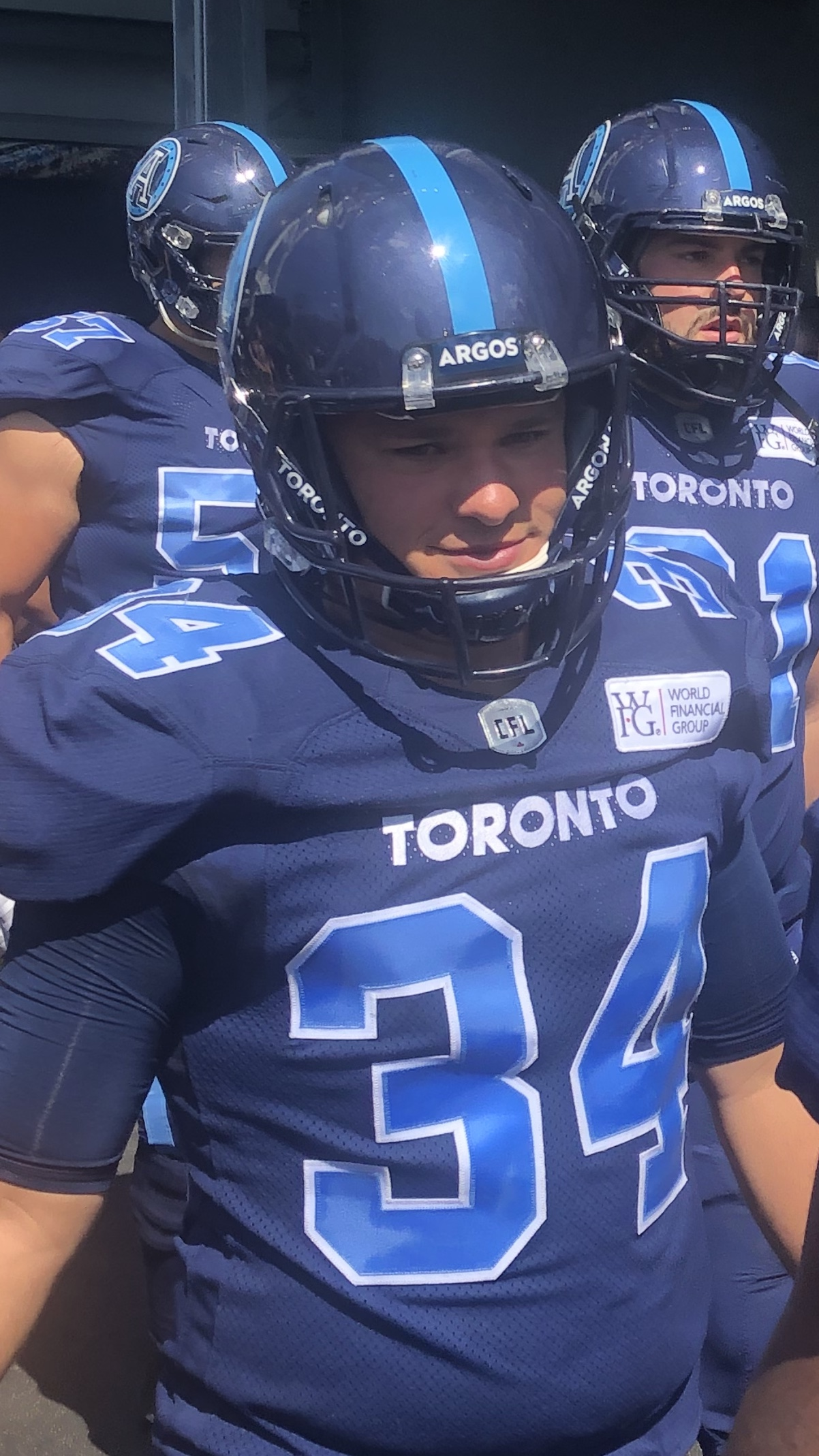
- Brown with the Toronto Argonauts in 2019

Profile
- Positions: Kicker, Punter

Personal information
- Born: October 30, 1995 (age 31); Southlake, Texas, U.S.
- Listed height: 5 ft 11 in (1.80 m)
- Listed weight: 180 lb (82 kg)

Career information
- High school: Carroll High School
- College: Nebraska Cornhuskers

Career history
- 2018–2019: Toronto Argonauts
- Stats at CFL.ca

Drew Brown (born October 30, 1995) is an American former professional football placekicker and punter. He played college football for the Nebraska Cornhuskers from 2014 to 2017.

== Professional career ==
Brown was signed by the Toronto Argonauts of the Canadian Football League (CFL). He made his professional debut on October 12, 2018, and played in four games that year. He played in three games in 2019, completing three of five field goal attempts while notably missing a 33-yard attempt and shanking a kickoff out of bounds that led to a BC Lions' game-winning rouge in a tied game on July 6, 2019. He was released two days following that game on July 8, 2019.
