= Cethan Carter =

American football player (born 1995)

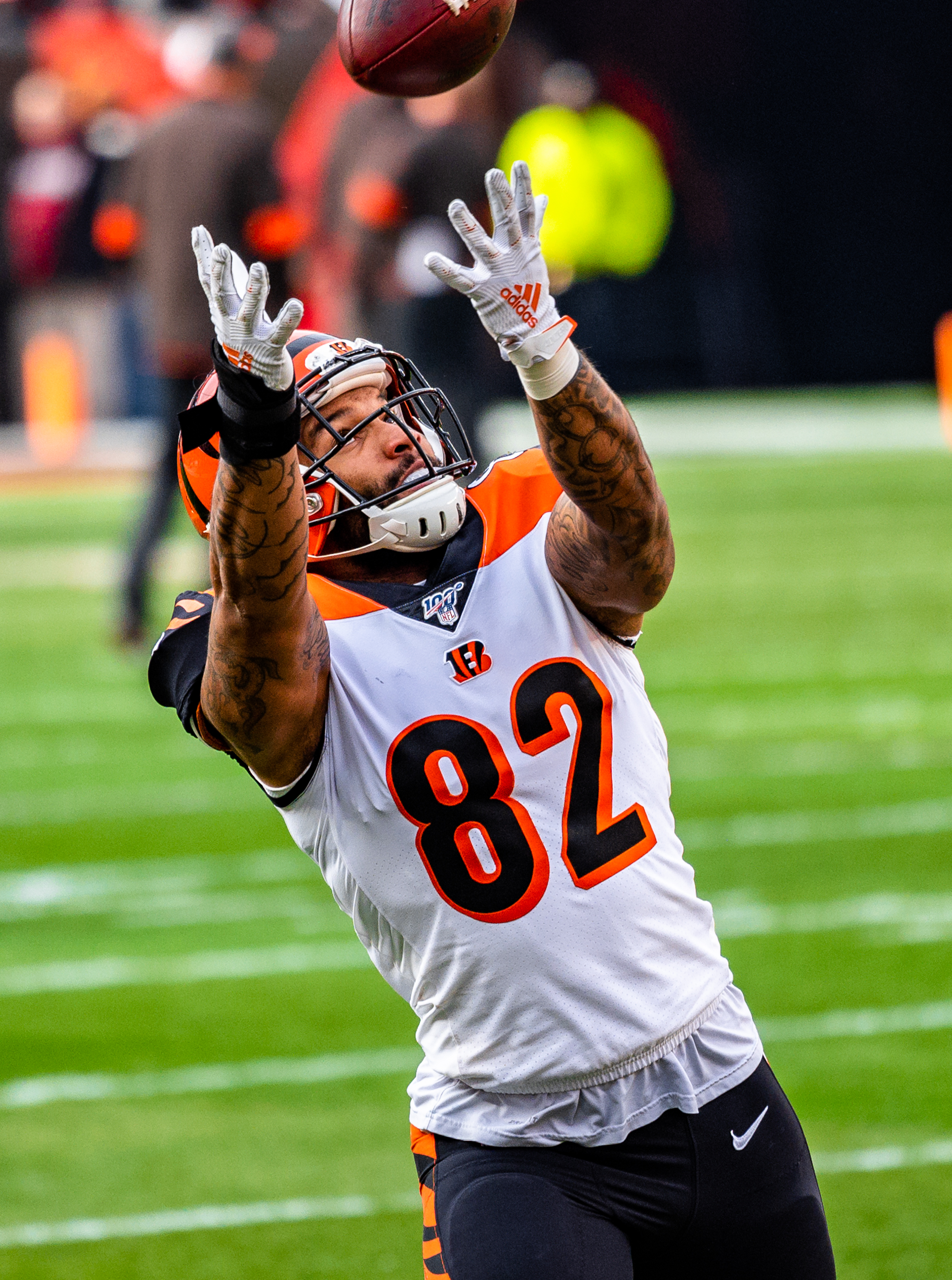
- Carter with the Cincinnati Bengals in 2019

No. 82
- Position: Tight end / Fullback

Personal information
- Born: September 5, 1995 (age 31); New Orleans, Louisiana, U.S.
- Listed height: 6 ft 3 in (1.91 m)
- Listed weight: 243 lb (110 kg)

Career information
- High school: Rummel (Metairie, Louisiana)
- College: Nebraska (2013–2016)
- NFL draft: 2017: undrafted

Career history
- Cincinnati Bengals (2017–2020); Miami Dolphins (2021–2022)

Career NFL statistics
- Receptions: 9
- Receiving yards: 82
- Receiving touchdowns: 1
- Stats at Pro Football Reference

Cethan Carter (born September 5, 1995) is an American former professional football player who was a tight end for the Cincinnati Bengals and Miami Dolphins of the National Football League (NFL). He played college football for the Nebraska Cornhuskers.

== Early life ==
Carter played high school football at Archbishop Rummel High School in Metairie, Louisiana. While at Archbishop Rummel, he spent time lining up at tight end, H-back and fullback. He caught 23 passes for 418 yards and 5 touchdowns his senior year in 2012, earning Honorable Mention All-State honors. Rummel had a 14–0 record and won the Louisiana Class 5A state championship in 2012. He also played basketball at Rummel, helping the team to a 21–11 record and a state quarterfinals appearance in 2012.

== College career ==
Carter played for the Nebraska Cornhuskers of the University of Nebraska–Lincoln from 2013 to 2016. He was a criminology and criminal justice major at Nebraska.

He played in 13 games, starting 6, in 2013 and caught 10 passes for 127 yards. Carter was named a True Freshman All-American by 247Sports in 2013. He also earned Big Ten Conference Honorable Mention All-Freshman honors. He played in 9 games, starting 8, in 2014, catching 6 passes for 98 yards and 1 touchdown. He missed four games at midseason due to a foot injury. Carter missed the first two games of the 2015 season. He then played in, and started, the final 11 games of the season, catching 24 passes for 329 yards and 2 touchdowns. He also rushed twice for 48 yards and a 32-yard rushing touchdown in 2015, becoming the first tight end in school history to score a rushing touchdown. Carter was named Honorable Mention All-Big Ten by the media in 2015. He played in 10 games, all starts in 2016, catching 19 passes for 190 yards and 1 touchdown. He also rushed three times for 34 yards. At midseason, Carter missed three whole games and most of a fourth due to an elbow injury. He was named Honorable Mention All-Big Ten by both the media and coaches in 2016.

He played in 43 games, starting 35, during his college career, catching 59 passes for 744 yards and 4 touchdowns. His 59 receptions ranked fifth all-time in school history for a tight end. He also rushed 5 times for 84 yards and 1 touchdown.

== Professional career ==
=== Pre-draft ===
Carter was rated the 16th best tight end in the 2017 NFL draft by NFLDraftScout.com. Lance Zierlein of NFL.com predicted that he would go undrafted and sign as a priority free agent, stating that Carter "lacks the size and ability to sustain at the point of attack to handle in-line blocking duties on the next level" and that "He may not have the hands or route separation to handle pass-catching duties on the next level and he has played sparingly on special teams. To carve out a spot on a roster, Carter will have to prove that he can do one of those things well."

Pre-draft measurables
Height	Weight	Arm length	Hand span	40-yard dash	10-yard split	20-yard split	Bench press
6 ft 3 1/4 in (1.91 m)	241 lb (109 kg)	32 3/8 in (0.82 m)	9 in (0.23 m)	4.68 s	1.61 s	2.70 s	19 reps
All values from NFL Combine

=== Cincinnati Bengals ===
After going undrafted, Carter signed with the Cincinnati Bengals on May 5, 2017.

On September 1, 2018, Carter was placed on injured reserve with a shoulder injury.

On December 15, 2019, Carter scored his first NFL touchdown in Week 15 against the New England Patriots. He finished the season with two receptions for 13 yards. He was a core special teams player for the Bengals, as he racked up 16 special teams tackles.

Carter re-signed on a one-year restricted free agent contract with the Bengals on April 17, 2020.

=== Miami Dolphins ===
On March 18, 2021, Carter signed a three-year contract with the Miami Dolphins.

On October 8, 2022, Carter was placed on injured reserve. The Dolphins released him on March 7, 2023.
