= Nick Gates =

American football player (born 1995)

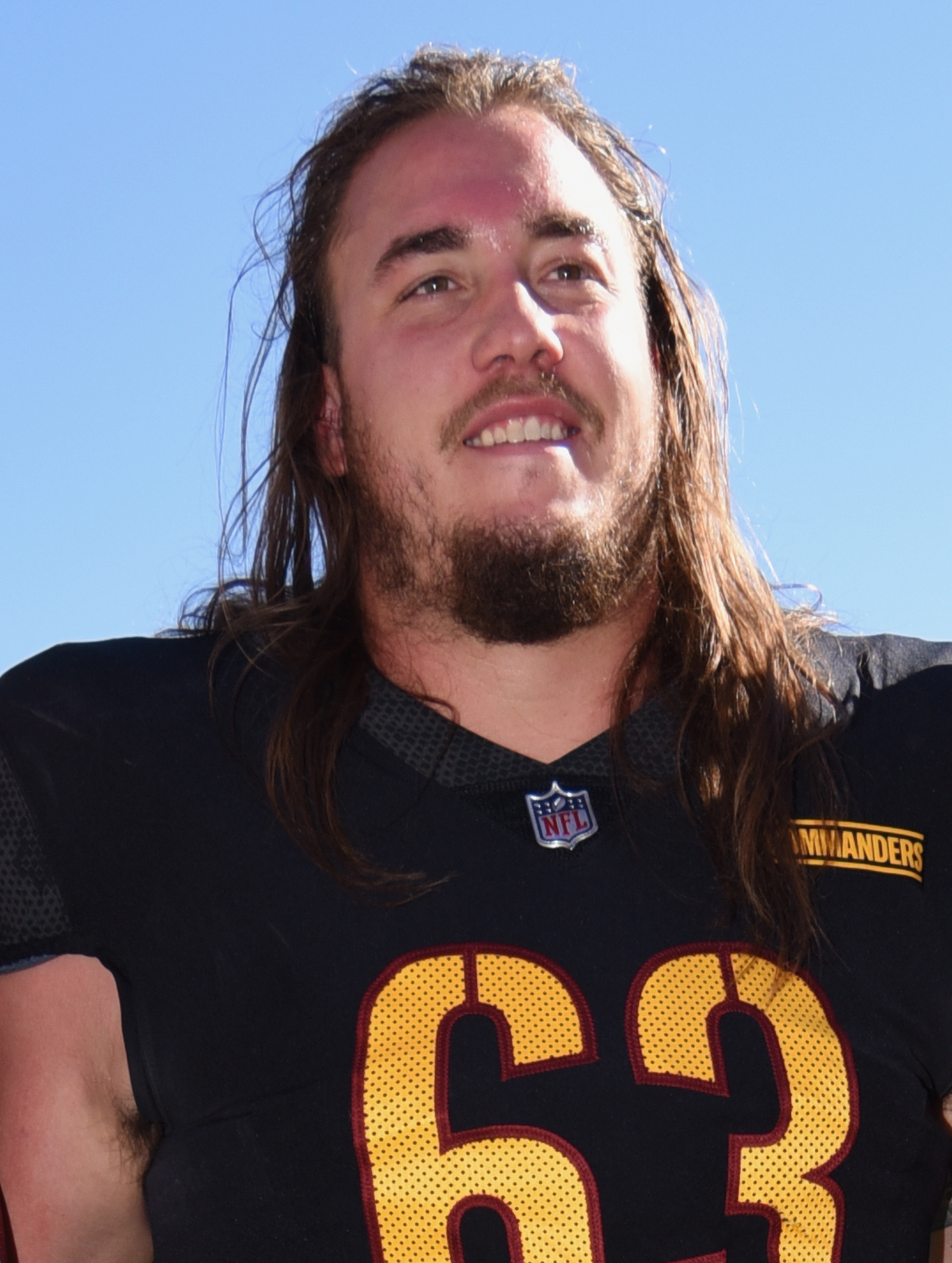
- Gates with the Washington Commanders in 2023

Profile
- Position: Center

Personal information
- Born: November 27, 1995 (age 30); Las Vegas, Nevada, U.S.
- Listed height: 6 ft 5 in (1.96 m)
- Listed weight: 312 lb (142 kg)

Career information
- High school: Bishop Gorman (Las Vegas)
- College: Nebraska (2014–2017)
- NFL draft: 2018: undrafted

Career history
- New York Giants (2018–2022); Washington Commanders (2023); Philadelphia Eagles (2024)

Awards and highlights
- Super Bowl champion (LIX)

Career NFL statistics as of 2024
- Games played: 66
- Games started: 40
- Stats at Pro Football Reference

Nicholas Gates (born November 27, 1995) is an American professional football center. He has previously played in the National Football League (NFL) for the New York Giants, Washington Commanders, and Philadelphia Eagles. He played college football for the Nebraska Cornhuskers and signed with the Giants as an undrafted free agent in 2018, and won Super Bowl LIX with the Eagles.

== Early life ==
Gates attended Bishop Gorman High School in Las Vegas, Nevada. He played baseball and football in high school. At 6'4 and 270 pounds, Gates was ranked as a four-star offensive tackle recruit by Rivals. He committed to play football for Nebraska in January 2014 over offers from Alabama, Colorado, Oklahoma, Texas A&M, UCLA, and USC, among others.

== College career ==
After redshirting as a freshman in 2014, Gates started 2015 at tackle on the offensive line. After his redshirt junior season in 2017, he declared for the 2018 NFL draft. He played in 35 games for Nebraska in three years.

== Professional career ==
Pre-draft measurables
| Height | Weight | Arm length | Hand span | 40-yard dash | 10-yard split | 20-yard split | 20-yard shuttle | Three-cone drill | Vertical jump | Broad jump | Bench press |
|---|---|---|---|---|---|---|---|---|---|---|---|
| 6 ft 5 3/8 in (1.97 m) | 307 lb (139 kg) | 32 in (0.81 m) | 10 1/4 in (0.26 m) | 5.46 s | 1.87 s | 3.11 s | 4.68 s | 7.61 s | 24 in (0.61 m) | 7 ft 10 in (2.39 m) | 20 reps |
All values from NFL Combine

=== New York Giants ===
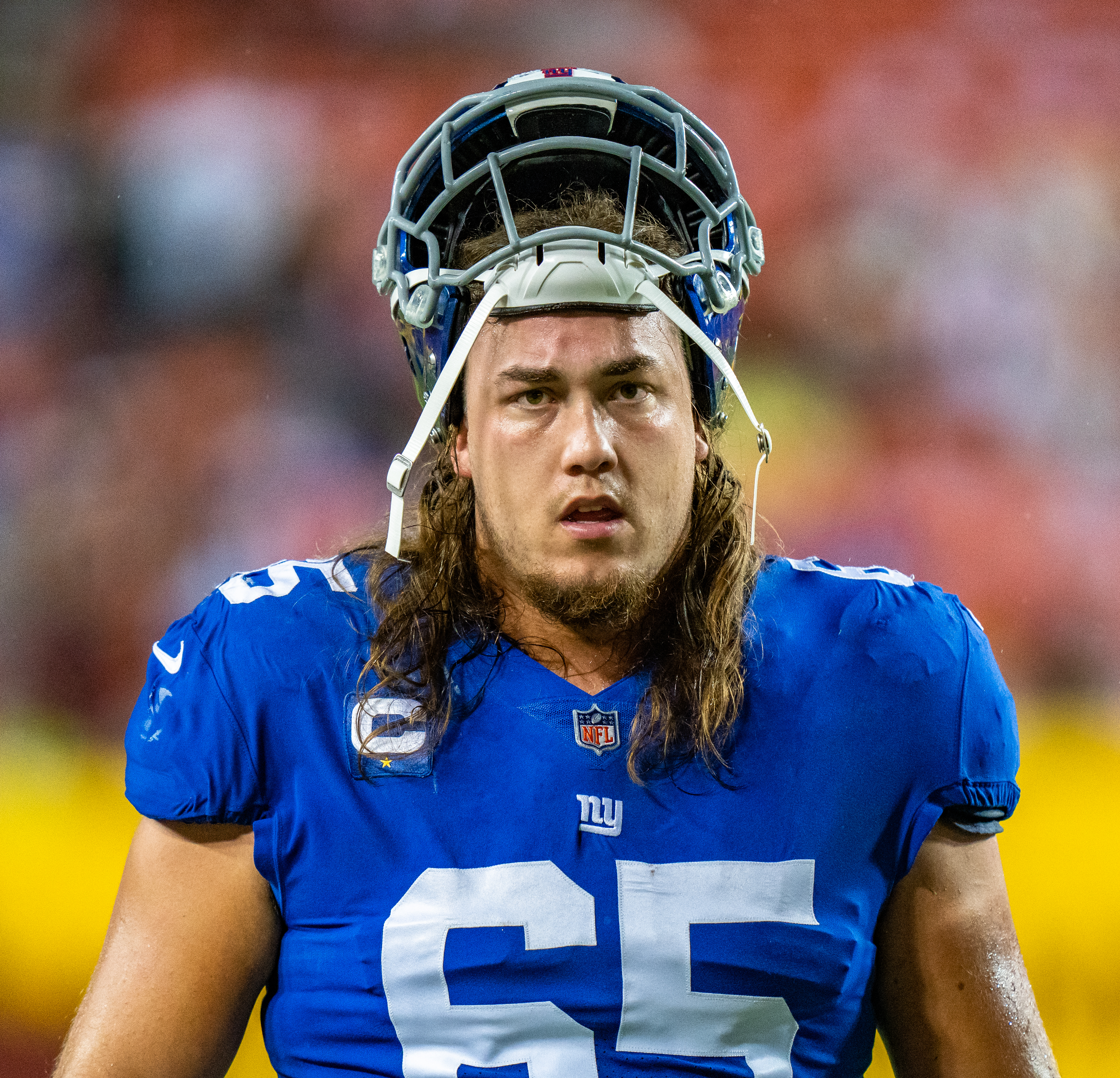
Gates with the New York Giants, 2021

Gates signed with the New York Giants as an undrafted free agent on May 11, 2018. He spent his rookie season on injured reserve.

The Giants gave Gates a two-year, $6.825 million contract extension on August 1, 2020. In the 2020 season, Gates started at center where he did not allow a sack. On September 6, 2021, the Giants announced Gates as a captain for the 2021 season.

On September 16, 2021, Gates suffered a season-ending lower-leg fracture in the first quarter of the Thursday Night Football game against the Washington Football Team. He underwent surgery the next day. Gates had seven surgeries to repair both his broken tibia and fibula in his left leg.

On August 23, 2022, Gates was placed on the reserve/PUP list to start the season. On October 26, 2022, Gates was activated from the PUP list.

=== Washington Commanders ===
On March 16, 2023, Gates signed a three-year contract with the Washington Commanders. After struggling in the first seven games of the 2023 season, Gates was downgraded on the team's depth chart with Tyler Larsen taking over as the starting center in Week 8. Gates was released by the team on March 2, 2024.

=== Philadelphia Eagles ===
Gates signed with the Philadelphia Eagles on July 30, 2024. He was released on August 27, and re-signed to the practice squad. Gates was promoted to the active roster on September 16. He won a Super Bowl championship when the Eagles defeated the Kansas City Chiefs 40–22 in Super Bowl LIX. Gates was released by the Eagles on February 18, 2025.
