= Brandon Reilly (American football) =

American football player (born 1993)

No. 87, 89, 83, 13
- Position: Wide receiver

Personal information
- Born: September 23, 1993 (age 33); Lincoln, Nebraska, U.S.
- Listed height: 6 ft 1 in (1.85 m)
- Listed weight: 202 lb (92 kg)

Career information
- High school: Lincoln Southwest (Lincoln, Nebraska)
- College: Nebraska
- NFL draft: 2017: undrafted

Career history
- Buffalo Bills (2017); Detroit Lions (2018)*; Dallas Cowboys (2018)*; Detroit Lions (2019)*; Pittsburgh Steelers (2019)*; St. Louis BattleHawks (2020)
- * Offseason or practice squad member only
- Stats at Pro Football Reference

Brandon Reilly (born September 23, 1993) is an American former football wide receiver. He played college football at Nebraska. Reilly was awarded Academic All-Big Ten twice consecutively, both in 2013 and 2014, as well as six Nebraska Scholar-Athlete Honor Roll awards. Reilly is well known for catching the game-winning touchdown pass to upset the undefeated No. 7 Michigan State Spartans football team in the 2015 season.

== College career ==
=== 2013 ===
In 2013, Reilly had 3 receptions and 24 yards, averaging 8 yards per reception. Reilly played briefly in the 2013 game against Penn State. Reilly also played in the games against South Dakota State and Michigan.

=== 2014 ===
In the 2014 season, Brandon Reilly totaled 6 receptions and 85 yards overall, averaging 14.2 yards per reception. Reilly played briefly in the games against Wisconsin and Iowa, and the bowl game against USC.

=== 2015 ===
In 2015, Reilly scored the first four touchdowns of his collegiate career, and had a combined 37 receptions with 716 yards total. Reilly also had 10 rushing attempts, achieving 83 rushing yards over the season. He scored the first touchdown of his college career against the Miami Hurricanes, as well as having 5 receptions for a total of 71 yards, averaging 20.8 yards per reception. He had 112 receiving yards and 3 receptions in the Southern Mississippi game. He averaged 37 yards per catch, but scored no touchdowns in the game. In the 2015 game against Michigan State, Reilly caught the game-winning touchdown pass for the Cornhuskers, making the score 39-38, allowing the Huskers to win after the clock ran out. Reilly stepped out of bounds before returning onto the field to catch the ball, but he was ruled as forced out of bounds by the Michigan State cornerback, allowing him to still have eligibility to catch the ball.

=== 2016 ===
In August 2016, Reilly was cited for driving under the influence with a blood alcohol content of 0.15. He was suspended for the first game of the 2016 season. In his senior season, Reilly had 21 receptions for 412 yards, dealing with injuries throughout the year.

== Professional career ==
=== Buffalo Bills ===
Reilly signed with the Buffalo Bills as an undrafted free agent on May 5, 2017. He was waived on September 2, 2017, and was signed to the Bills' practice squad the next day. He was promoted to the active roster on December 5, 2017.

On September 1, 2018, Reilly was waived by the Bills.

=== Detroit Lions ===
On December 18, 2018, Reilly was signed to the Detroit Lions practice squad.

=== Dallas Cowboys ===
On January 8, 2019, Reilly was signed to the Dallas Cowboys practice squad.

=== Detroit Lions (second stint) ===
On January 22, 2019, Reilly signed a reserve/future contract with the Detroit Lions. He was waived on May 10, 2019, but was re-signed on June 3. He was waived again on July 30, 2019.

=== Pittsburgh Steelers ===
On July 31, 2019, Reilly was claimed off waivers by the Pittsburgh Steelers. He was released on August 31, 2019.

=== St. Louis BattleHawks ===
In October 2019, Reilly was drafted by the XFL's St. Louis BattleHawks. He had his contract terminated when the league suspended operations on April 10, 2020.
