= James Bradberry =

American football player (born 1993)

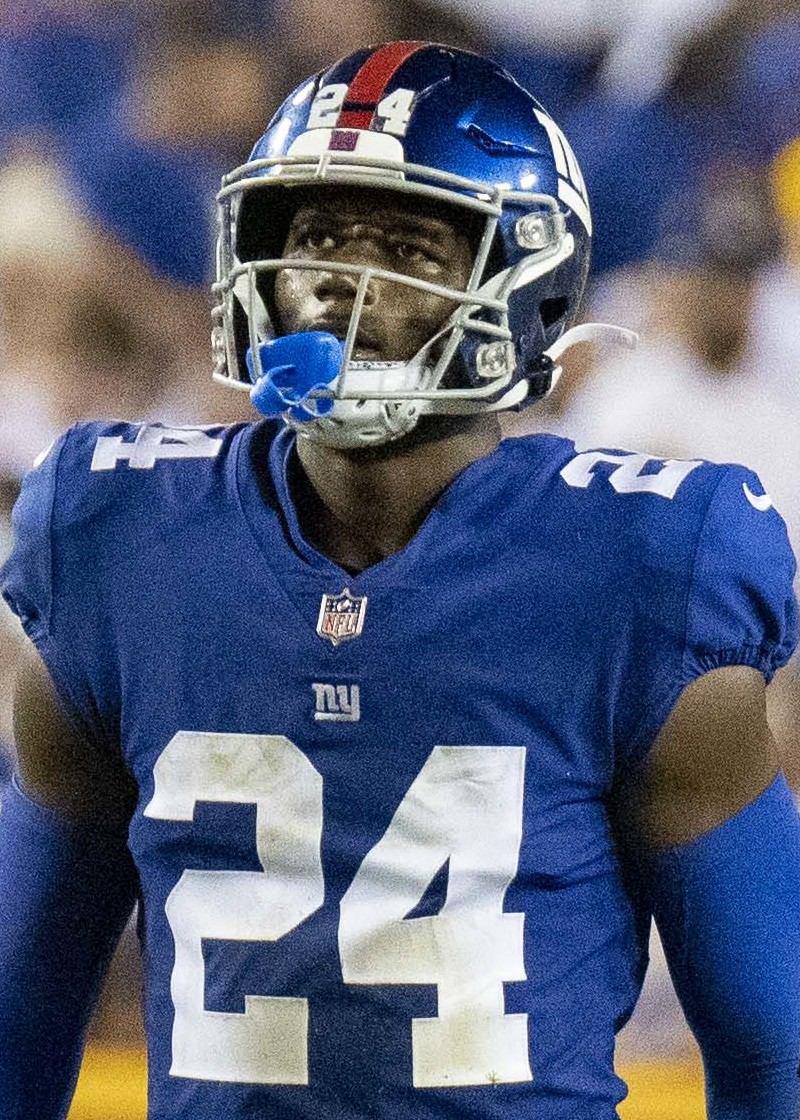
- Bradberry with the New York Giants in 2021

Profile
- Position: Cornerback

Personal information
- Born: August 4, 1993 (age 33); Pleasant Grove, Alabama, U.S.
- Listed height: 6 ft 1 in (1.85 m)
- Listed weight: 210 lb (95 kg)

Career information
- High school: Pleasant Grove
- College: Arkansas State (2011); Samford (2012–2015)
- NFL draft: 2016: 2nd round, 62nd overall pick

Career history
- Carolina Panthers (2016–2019); New York Giants (2020–2021); Philadelphia Eagles (2022–2024)

Awards and highlights
- Super Bowl champion (LIX); Second-team All-Pro (2022); Pro Bowl (2020)

Career NFL statistics as of 2024
- Total tackles: 478
- Sacks: 3.0
- Forced fumbles: 4
- Fumble recoveries: 4
- Pass deflections: 112
- Interceptions: 19
- Defensive touchdowns: 1
- Stats at Pro Football Reference

James Bradberry IV (born August 4, 1993) is an American professional football cornerback. He played college football for the Samford Bulldogs and was selected by the Carolina Panthers in the second round of the 2016 NFL draft. Bradberry has also been a member of the New York Giants and Philadelphia Eagles.

== Early life ==
Bradberry was born in August 1993 in Pleasant Grove, Alabama to Rosie and James Bradberry Sr.. He was a three-year varsity letterman as a member of Pleasant Grove High's Spartans football team. As a member of the Spartans, Bradberry played cornerback and safety positions. At a height of 6 ft 1 in (1.85 m) and weighing 180 pounds (82 kg), Bradberry was a two-sport athlete, playing varsity basketball. In 2010, during his senior season in football, Bradberry made nine interceptions and 45 tackles. He also earned all-metro and first team all-state honors. While part of the Spartans, Bradberry also served as team captain. Bradberry was also part of the National Honor Society. Rated a two-star recruiting prospect,

== College career ==
Upon graduating from Pleasant Grove in 2010, Bradberry enrolled at Arkansas State University on June 30, 2011. Bradberry was assigned as a defensive back both in his freshman season in 2011 and the 2012 season during which he redshirted.

Bradberry transferred to Samford University where he joined the Bulldogs for the 2012 season. He played as a starting cornerback for all 11 games. His debut season totals included 32 tackles, including 22 solo stops and two interceptions. This performance named Bradberry to the 2012 Southern Conference All-Freshman team. Bradberry returned to start in 12 of the 13 games of the 2013 season in which he totaled 26 tackles, 17 solo stops, two interceptions 10 pass break-ups. In the 2014 season, Bradberry started in all 11 games, finishing the season with 25 tackles and 22 solo stops. He went on to redshirt his senior season in 2015. While at Samford, Bradberry majored in sports administration.

== Professional career ==
Pre-draft measurables
Height	Weight	Arm length	Hand span	40-yard dash	10-yard split	20-yard split	20-yard shuttle	Three-cone drill	Vertical jump	Broad jump	Bench press
6 ft 0 3/4 in (1.85 m)	211 lb (96 kg)	33 in (0.84 m)	9 1/8 in (0.23 m)	4.50 s	1.53 s	2.60 s	4.21 s	6.91 s	36 in (0.91 m)	11 ft 0 in (3.35 m)	16 reps
All values from NFL Combine/Pro Day

=== Carolina Panthers ===
The Carolina Panthers selected Bradberry in the second round (62nd overall) of the 2016 NFL draft. He was the tenth cornerback selected in 2016. He was the first of three cornerbacks drafted by the Panthers in 2016, in a trio that included third-round pick (77th overall) Daryl Worley and fifth-round pick (141st overall) Zack Sanchez. He became only the seventh player to be drafted from Samford since 1967 and was the fourth out of the last five drafts (2012–2016). Other Samford alumni drafted include Jaquiski Tartt (2015) and Cortland Finnegan (2006).

External videos
- Panthers select Bradberry 62nd overall

==== 2016 ====
On May 10, 2016, the Carolina Panthers signed Bradberry to a four–year, US$3.96 million rookie contract that included $1.70 million guaranteed and an initial signing bonus of $1.08 million.

During training camp, Bradberry competed against Robert McClain, Sanchez, Leonard Johnson, and Daryl Worley for a job as a starting cornerback following the release of Josh Norman. Head coach Ron Rivera named Bradberry and veteran Bené Benwikere as the starting cornerbacks to start the regular season.

On September 8, Bradberry made his professional regular season debut and first career start in the Carolina Panthers' season-opener at the Denver Broncos and made six combined tackles (five solo) and a pass deflection in a 21–20 loss. He made his first career tackle on running back C. J. Anderson during the first drive of the game. On September 18, Bradberry made two solo tackles, two pass deflections, and made his first career interception off a pass by quarterback Blaine Gabbert to wide receiver Torrey Smith during a 46–27 victory against the San Francisco 49ers in Week 2. On October 2, he made two solo tackles before exiting the Panthers' 48–33 loss at the Atlanta Falcons in the second quarter with an injury. Bené Benwikere and rookie Daryl Worley gave up over 300 receiving yards to Julio Jones in Bradberry's absence. On October 7, the Carolina Panthers released starting cornerback Benwikere in response to the secondary's embarrassing performance, subsequently making Bradberry the No. 1 starting cornerback alongside fellow rookie Daryl Worley. He was inactive for the next three games (Weeks 5–8) due to a severe case of turf toe he sustained during the loss to the Falcons. In Week 13, Bradberry collected a season-high eight combined tackles (seven solo) and broke up a pass during a 40–7 loss to the Seattle Seahawks. On January 1, 2017, Bradberry made six solo tackles, a season-high two pass deflections, and intercepted a pass by Jameis Winston to Adam Humphries during a 17–16 loss at the Tampa Bay Buccaneers. He finished his rookie season with 59 combined tackles (47 solo), ten pass deflections, and two interceptions in 13 games and 13 starts. Bradberry graded out as the top ranked rookie cornerback and the Panthers' top defensive back by PFF.

==== 2017 ====
During the off-season, head coach Ron Riveira promoted secondaries coach Steve Wilks to defensive coordinator after Sean McDermott accepted the head coaching position with the Buffalo Bills. On June 5, 2017, Bradberry suffered a fractured wrist during organized team activities and was ruled out for a least a month. Head coach Ron Rivera named Bradberry and Worley the starting cornerbacks and Captain Munnerlyn as the starting nickelback.

On October 12, Bradberry recorded six combined tackles (four solo), broke up a pass, and made his first career sacks on quarterback Carson Wentz during a 28–23 loss to the Philadelphia Eagles. In Week 14, he made six combined tackles (five solo), a season-high three pass deflections, and intercepted a pass by Case Keenum in the Panthers' 31–24 victory over the Minnesota Vikings. The following week, Bradberry recorded a season-high seven combined tackles, a pass deflection, and intercepted a pass by Aaron Rodgers during a 31–24 victory against the Green Bay Packers. He finished the 2017 season with 85 combined tackles (66 solo), ten pass deflections, two interceptions, and a sack in 16 games and 16 starts.

The Carolina Panthers finished the 2017 NFL season second in the National Football Conference (NFC) South with an 11–5 record and received a Wild Card berth. On January 7, 2018, Bradberry started in his first career playoff game and recorded eight combined tackles (seven solo) as the Panthers lost 31–26 at the New Orleans Saints in the NFC Wild Card Round.

==== 2018 ====
On January 23, 2018, Panthers' head coach Ron Rivera promoted defensive line coach Eric Washington to defensive coordinator after Steve Wilks departed to accept the head coaching position with the Arizona Cardinals. He became the third defensive coordinator Bradberry played under in as many seasons. During training camp, Bradberry competed for the role as a starting cornerback against Donte Jackson, Captain Munnerlyn, Ross Cockrell, Corn Elder, and Kevon Seymour. He was named the No. 1 starting cornerback to begin the regular season and was paired with rookie Donte Jackson.

On October 7, he collected a season-high eight combined tackles (seven solo) and broke up two passes as the Panthers defeated the New York Giants 33–31. In Week 12, Bradberry made three combined tackles (two solo), broke up a pass, and made the first sack of his career on quarterback Russell Wilson for a nine-yard loss during a 30–27 loss to the Seattle Seahawks. On December 17, 2018, Bradberry recorded three combined tackles (two solo), made a pass deflection, and had his only interception of the season on a pass attempt thrown by Drew Brees to tight end Dan Arnold during a 9–12 loss to the New Orleans Saints. The following week, he had one tackle and a season-high four pass deflections during a 10–24 loss against the Atlanta Falcons in Week 16. He started all 16 games during the 2018 NFL season and finished with a total of 70 combined tackles (57 solo), a sack, an interception, and a team-leading 15 pass deflections.

==== 2019 ====
Bradberry entered training camp slated as Carolina's No. 1 starting cornerback. Head coach Ron Rivera retained Bradberry and Donte Jackson as the starting cornerbacks for the second consecutive season.

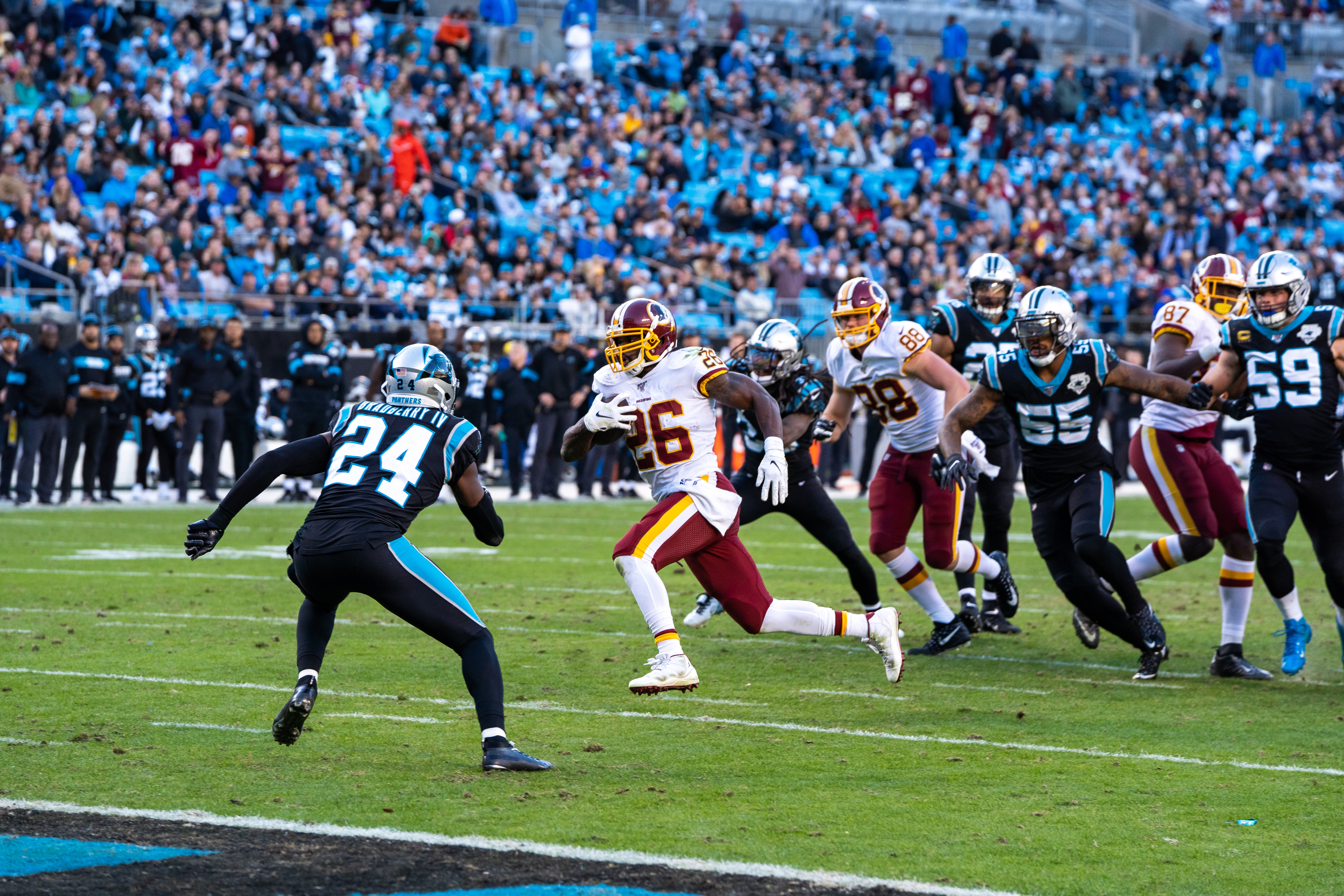
Bradberry (left) in a game against the Washington Redskins in 2019.

On September 8, 2019, Bradberry started in the Carolina Panthers' home-opener against the Los Angeles Rams and made four combined tackles (two solo), one sack, and also intercepted a pass by Jared Goff to wide receiver Robert Woods during a 27–30 loss. On October 13, Bradberry had one of the best performances of his career as he collected a season-high 11 solo tackles, a season-high four pass deflections, and made a career-high two interceptions off passes thrown by Jameis Winston during a 37–26 win at the Tampa Bay Buccaneers in Week 6. He was inactive for the Panthers' 16-24 loss at the Green Bay Packers in Week 9 due to an injury to his groin. His injury ended a streak of 49 consecutive starts in-a-row. On December 3, the Panthers fired head coach Ron Rivera after they fell to a 5–7 record. Defensive line coach Perry Fewell was appointed to interim head coach for the last four games of the season. He finished the 2019 NFL season with a total of 65 combined tackles (51 solo), 12 passes defended, three interceptions, and a sack in 15 games and 15 starts.

=== New York Giants ===
==== 2020 ====
On March 16, 2020, the New York Giants signed Bradberry to a three–year, $43.50 million contract that includes $31.98 million guaranteed and $29.80 million guaranteed upon signing. He entered training camp projected to be the No. 1 starting cornerback after Deandre Baker was placed on the commissioner's exempt list following an arrest. Head coach Joe Judge named Bradberry the No. 1 starting cornerback to begin the season and paired him with Corey Ballentine.

In Week 2, Bradberry made three solo tackles, a season-high four pass deflections, and had his first interception with the Giants on a pass thrown by Mitchell Trubisky to wide receiver Allen Robinson during a 17–13 loss at the Chicago Bears. In Week 14, he collected a season-high seven solo tackles and made one pass deflection during a 7–26 loss to the Arizona Cardinals. On December 17, the Panthers placed him on the reserve/COVID-19 list. On December 21, he was cleared to be activated from the COVID-19/reserve list and was added to the active roster after missing a Week 15 loss to the Cleveland Browns. He finished the 2020 NFL season with 54 combined tackles (44 solo), 18 passes defended, three interceptions, two forced fumbles, and one fumble recovery in 15 games and 15 starts. He earned his first Pro Bowl and was invited to play in the 2021 Pro Bowl. He was ranked 74th by his fellow players on the NFL Top 100 Players of 2021.

==== 2021 ====
During the offseason Bradberry restructured his contract in order to give the team some cap room. He began training camp as the de facto starting cornerback under defensive coordinator Patrick Graham. Head coach Joe Judge named Bradberry the No. 1 starting cornerback to begin the season and paired him with Adoree' Jackson.

On September 16, 2021, Bradberry collected a season-high seven combined tackles (six solo), made one pass deflection, and intercepted a pass thrown by Taylor Heinicke to wide receiver Terry McLaurin during a 29–30 loss at the Washington Football Team. On October 2, it was reported that Bradberry once again agreed to restructure his contract in order to increase cap room for the Giants. On January 2, 2022, Bradberry had one tackle, a season-high two pass deflections, and set a career-high with his fourth interception of the season off a pass thrown by Andy Dalton to wide receiver Allen Robinson during a 3–29 loss at the Chicago Bears. He started in all 17 games and finished the 2021 NFL season with 47 combined tackles (37 solo), 17 passes defended, a career-high four interceptions, and two fumble recoveries.

==== 2022 ====
New York Giants' General manager David Gettleman retired after the 2021 NFL season. Gettleman was responsible for the Carolina Panthers drafting Bradberry when he was their General manager and was also responsible for signing him as an unrestricted free agent as the General manager of the New York Giants. On May 9, 2022, the New York Giants released Bradberry after they were unable to find a trade partner.

=== Philadelphia Eagles ===
==== 2022 ====
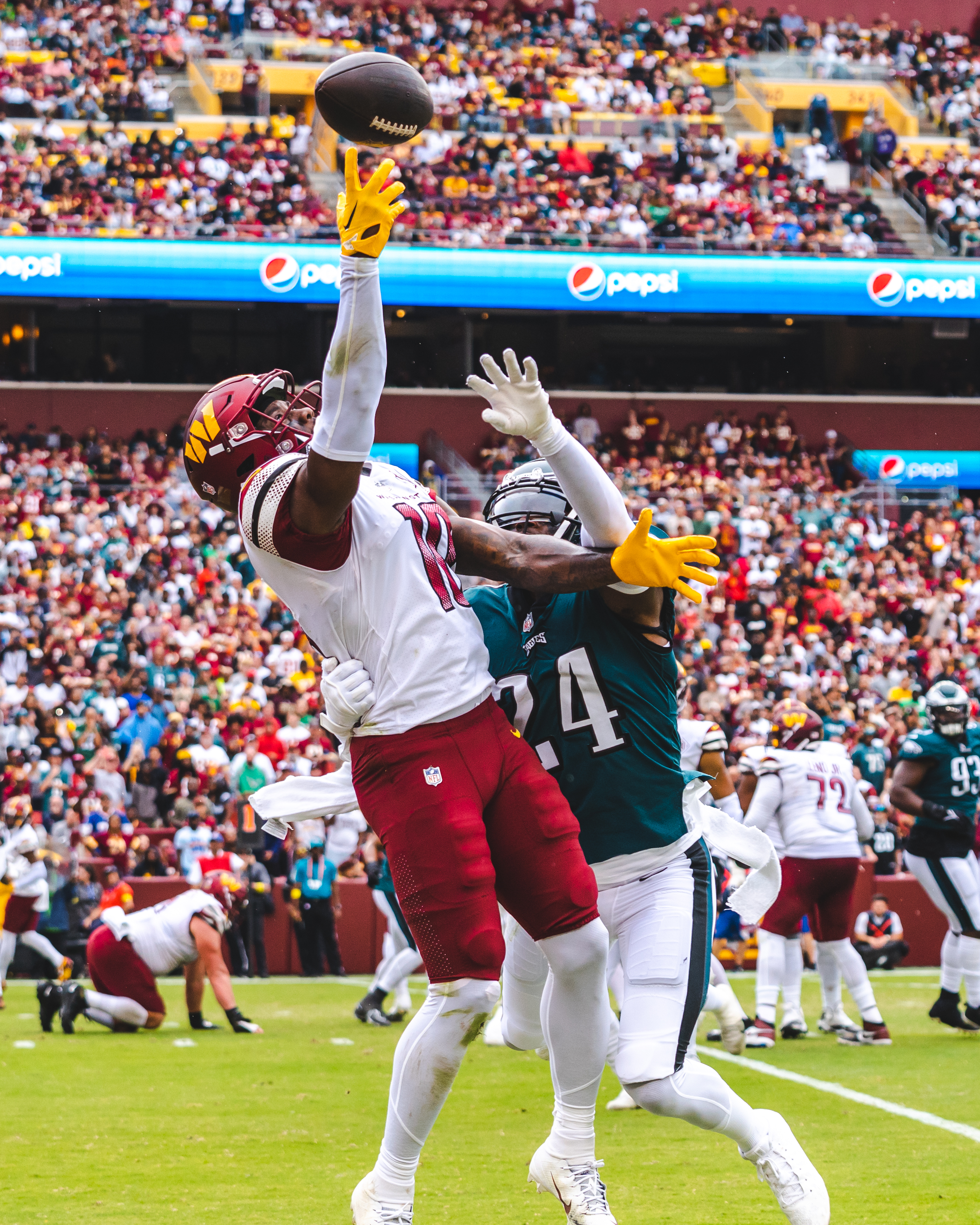
Bradberry (right) playing against the Washington Commanders in 2022.

On May 18, 2022, the Philadelphia Eagles signed Bradberry to a fully guaranteed one–year, $7.25 million contract that includes an initial signing bonus of $6.21 million. He was signed as a replacement for Steven Nelson after he departed during free agency. Head coach Nick Sirianni named him the No. 2 starting cornerback to begin the season, alongside No. 1 cornerback Darius Slay.

On September 11, Bradberry made his debut with the Philadelphia Eagles in their season-opener at the Detroit Lions and made two combined tackles (one solo), one pass deflection, and returned an interception thrown by Jared Goff intended for tight end T. J. Hockenson 27–yards for the first touchdown of his career during a 38–35 victory. In Week 3, he collected a season-high five combined tackles (four solo) and made one pass deflection during the Eagles 24–8 victory at the Washington Commanders. In Week 6, Bradberry recorded three solo tackles and set a season-high with four pass deflections as the Eagles defeated the Dallas Cowboys 26–17. He started in all 17 games and finished with 44 combined tackles, 17 passes defended, three interceptions, and one touchdown.

The Philadelphia Eagles finished the 2022 NFL season a top the NFC East with a 14–3 record to clinch a first-round bye. On January 21, 2023, Bradberry had two solo tackles, two pass deflections, and had an interception off a pass thrown by Daniel Jones to wide receiver Darius Slayton as the Eagles routed the New York Giants 38–7 in the Divisional Round. The following week, the Eagles defeated the San Francisco 49ers 31–7 during the NFC Championship Game and advanced to the Super Bowl.

On February 12, Bradberry started in Super Bowl LVII and recorded five combined tackles (four solo) during a 38–35 loss to the Kansas City Chiefs. Just after the two-minute warning near the end of the game, Bradberry was called for a controversial holding penalty on JuJu Smith-Schuster as the Chiefs were on the Eagles' 15-yard line. The penalty proved costly as it gave Kansas City a new set of downs and allowed them to run the clock down to 11 seconds before Harrison Butker successfully made the game-winning field goal. After the game, Bradberry admitted that the holding call was correct saying, "It was a holding. I tugged his jersey. I was hoping they would let it slide."

==== 2023 ====
On March 15, 2023, the Philadelphia Eagles signed Bradberry to a three–year, $38.00 million contract extension with $20.00 million guaranteed and an initial signing bonus of $6.98 million. In the 2023 season, Bradberry made 16 starts. He had 54 total tackles (39 solo), one interception, 13 passes defended, and one forced fumble.

==== 2024 ====
Bradberry suffered a leg injury in practice before the 2024 season and was placed on injured reserve on August 29, 2024. Bradberry later revealed after the season ended that the injury he suffered was a torn Achilles and Soleus muscle. However, Bradberry would become a Super Bowl champion after the Eagles defeated the Kansas City Chiefs in Super Bowl LIX, 40–22, avenging their loss two years prior.

==== 2025 ====
On March 12, 2025, the Philadelphia Eagles released Bradberry with a post-June 1 designation.

== NFL career statistics ==
Year	Team	Games		Tackles				Interceptions						Fumbles			
Year	Team	GP	GS	Cmb	Solo	Ast	Sck	PD	Int	Yds	Avg	Lng	TD	FF	FR	Yds	TD
2016	CAR	13	13	59	47	12	0.0	10	2	21	10.5	5	0	0	0	0	0
2017	CAR	16	16	85	66	19	1.0	10	2	3	1.5	3	0	1	0	0	0
2018	CAR	16	16	70	58	12	1.0	15	1	29	29.0	29	0	1	0	0	0
2019	CAR	15	15	65	51	14	1.0	12	3	0	0.0	0	0	0	0	0	0
2020	NYG	16	16	54	44	10	0.0	18	3	0	0.0	0	0	0	0	0	0
2021	NYG	17	16	72	61	11	0.0	17	4	0	0.0	0	0	0	0	0	0
2022	PHI	17	17	44	39	5	0.0	17	3	54	18.0	27	1	0	0	0	0
2023	PHI	16	16	54	39	15	0.0	13	1	0	0.0	0	0	0	0	0	0
Career		69	58	290	245	45	0.0	31	19	33	8.3	18	1	2	1	2	0

== Personal life ==
On April 5, 2024, Bradberry's Spartan jersey number 10 was retired in a ceremony held at Pleasant Grove High.
