= 2020 New York Giants season =

96th season in franchise history

- Owner: John Mara; Steve Tisch
- General manager: Dave Gettleman
- Head coach: Joe Judge
- Home stadium: MetLife Stadium

Results
- Record: 6–10
- Division place: 2nd NFC East
- Playoffs: Did not qualify
- Pro Bowlers: CB James Bradberry; TE Evan Engram

Uniform
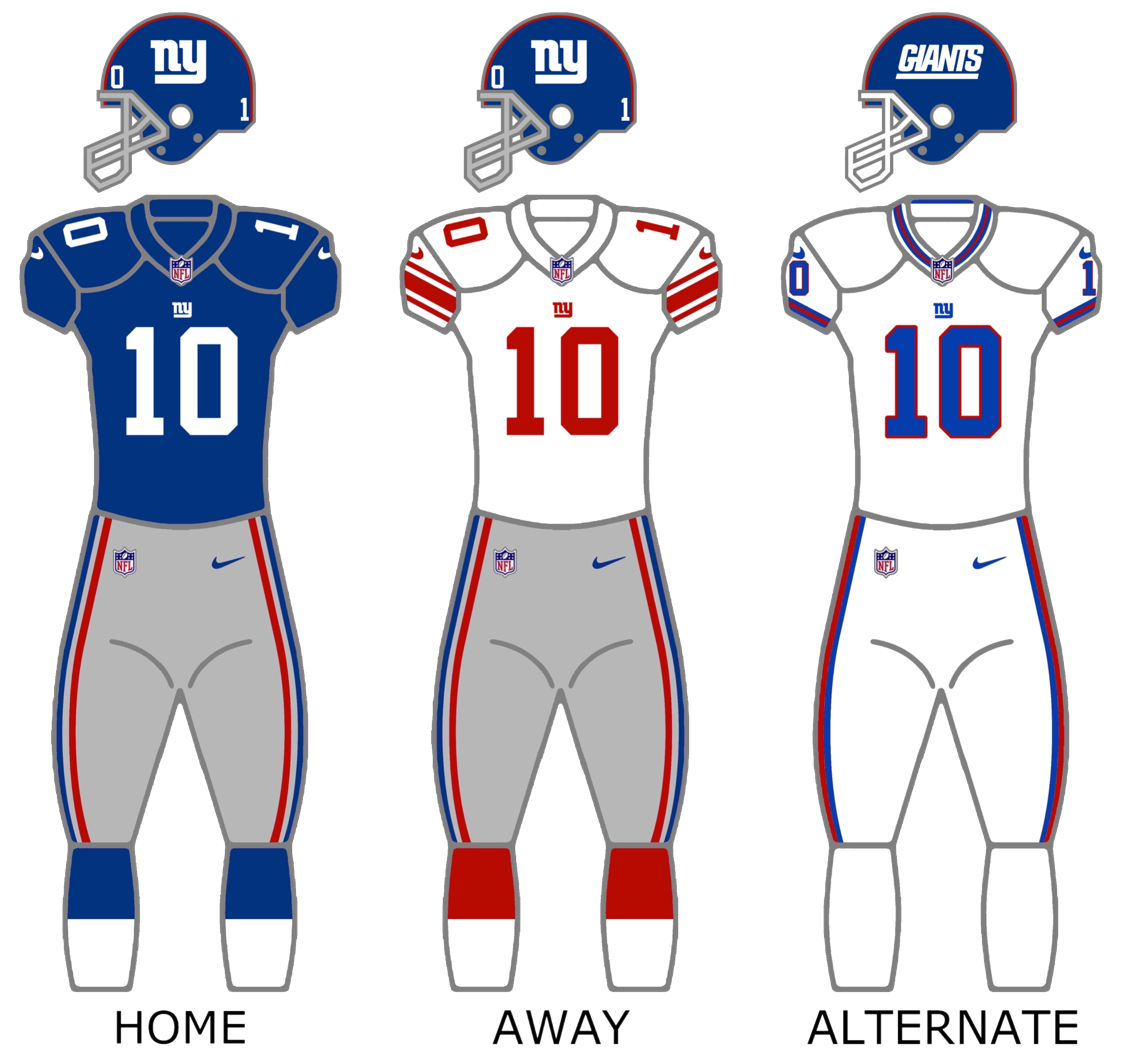

The 2020 season was the New York Giants' 96th in the National Football League (NFL) and their first under head coach Joe Judge.

For the first time since 2003, long-time quarterback Eli Manning was not on the roster, as he announced his retirement on January 22. Manning led the Giants to six playoff appearances, three NFC East titles, and two Super Bowl wins in the 2007 and 2011 seasons, winning the game MVP title in both Super Bowls.

Despite starting the season 0–5 for the third time in eight years, the Giants improved on their 4–12 record from the previous season with their week 13 upset win over the Seattle Seahawks and rallied to finish 6–10, but despite beating their divisional rival, the Dallas Cowboys, the Giants failed to win the NFC East or make the playoffs for the fourth consecutive year, following the Washington Football Team winning their final game against the Philadelphia Eagles in Week 17. The Giants would have needed the Eagles to win in order to win the NFC East due to their head-to-head record against Washington, and it would have made them the first team in the Super Bowl era to make the playoffs with a double-digit losing record, as well as the first team to make the playoffs after starting 0–5.

On July 20, 2020, the Giants confirmed that their home games would take place without fans in attendance due to the ongoing COVID-19 pandemic in the United States.

== Offseason ==
=== Signings ===
Position	Player	Age	2019 team	Contract
CB	James Bradberry	26	Carolina Panthers	3 years, $43.5 million
ILB	Blake Martinez	26	Green Bay Packers	3 years, $30.75 million
TE	Levine Toilolo	28	San Francisco 49ers	2 years, $6.2 million
OLB	Kyler Fackrell	28	Green Bay Packers	1 year, $4.6 million
OT	Cameron Fleming	27	Dallas Cowboys	1 year, $3.438 million
SS	Nate Ebner	30	New England Patriots	1 year, $2 million
QB	Colt McCoy	33	Washington Redskins	1 year, $2.25 million
RB	Dion Lewis	29	Tennessee Titans	1 year, $1.55 million
DB	Dravon Askew-Henry	24	New York Guardians	2 years, $1.39 million
DT	Austin Johnson	25	Tennessee Titans	1 year, $1.5 million
TE	Eric Tomlinson	27	Oakland Raiders	1 year, $1.02 million
LS	Casey Kreiter	29	Denver Broncos	1 year, $1.048 million
CB	Logan Ryan	29	Tennessee Titans	1 year, $7.5 million

=== Draft ===
2020 New York Giants Draft
Round	Selection	Player	Position	College	Notes
1	4	Andrew Thomas	OT	Georgia	
2	36	Xavier McKinney	S	Alabama	
3	99	Matt Peart	OT	UConn	Compensatory pick
4	110	Darnay Holmes	CB	UCLA	
5	150	Shane Lemieux	G	Oregon	
6	183	Cam Brown	LB	Penn State	
7	218	Carter Coughlin	LB	Minnesota	
7	238	T. J. Brunson	LB	South Carolina	from New Orleans
7	247	Chris Williamson	CB	Minnesota	Compensatory pick
7	255	Tae Crowder	LB	Georgia	Compensatory pick

Pre-draft trades

- On October 23, 2018, the Giants traded cornerback Eli Apple to the New Orleans Saints for a fourth-round pick in the 2019 draft and a seventh-round pick in the 2020 draft.
- On October 29, 2019, the Giants traded their third-round pick in the 2020 draft and a fifth-round pick in the 2021 draft to the New York Jets in exchange for defensive end Leonard Williams.

=== Undrafted free agents ===
Player	Position	College
Christian Angulo	CB	Hampton
Oluwole Betiku	DE	Illinois
Case Cookus	QB	Northern Arizona
Derrick Dillon	WR	LSU
Malcolm Elmore	CB	Central Methodist
Tyler Haycraft	OT	Louisville
Rysen John	WR/TE	Simon Fraser
Niko Lalos	DE	Dartmouth
JaQuarius Landrews	S	Mississippi State
Javon Leake	RB	Maryland
Dana Levine	OLB	Temple
Austin Mack	WR	Ohio State
Kyle Markway	TE	South Carolina
Kyle Murphy	OT	Rhode Island
Dominique Ross	OLB	North Carolina
Binjimen Victor	WR	Ohio State

== Staff ==
2020 New York Giants staff
Front office: President/CEO – John Mara; Chairman/executive vice president – Steve Tisch; Senior vice president & general manager – Dave Gettleman; Vice president of football operations/assistant general manager – Kevin Abrams; Senior vice president of player personnel – Chris Mara; Director of player personnel – Mark Koncz; Director of pro personnel – Ken Sternfeld; Director of college scouting – Chris Pettit; Head coaches: Head coach – Joe Judge; Assistant head coach/defensive coordinator – Patrick Graham; Offensive coaches: Offensive coordinator – Jason Garrett; Quarterbacks – Jerry Schuplinski; Running backs – Burton Burns; Wide receivers – Tyke Tolbert; Tight ends – Freddie Kitchens; Offensive line -– Marc Colombo (fired after week 10); Offensive line – Dave DeGuglielmo (took over for Colombo); Assistant offensive line – Ben Wilkerson; Senior offensive assistant – Derek Dooley; Offensive assistant – Stephen Brown; Offensive quality control – Bobby Blick and Nick Williams	Defensive coaches: Defensive line – Sean Spencer; Outside linebacker/Senior Defensive assistant – Bret Bielema (left before week 15 to become Illinois head coach); Inside linebackers – Kevin Sherrer; Defensive backs – Jerome Henderson; Assistant defensive backs – Anthony Blevins; Defensive assistant – Jody Wright; Defensive quality control – Mike Treier; Special teams coaches: Special teams coordinator – Thomas McGaughey; Assistant special teams – Tom Quinn; Coaching Assistants: Special projects and situations – Amos Jones; Chief of staff – Ryan Hollern; Strength and conditioning: Director of strength and performance – Craig Fitzgerald; Assistant strength and performance – Thomas Stallworth; Performance manager/assistant strength and performance – Sam Coad

== Final roster ==
2020 New York Giants roster
Quarterbacks (QB): 8 Daniel Jones; 12 Colt McCoy; Running backs (RB): 22 Wayne Gallman; 33 Dion Lewis; 41 Alfred Morris; Wide receivers (WR): 18 C. J. Board; 81 Austin Mack; 13 Dante Pettis; 87 Sterling Shepard; 86 Darius Slayton; 15 Golden Tate; Tight ends (TE): 88 Evan Engram; 82 Kaden Smith; 85 Levine Toilolo	Offensive linemen (OL): 72 Jackson Barton T; 75 Cameron Fleming T; 65 Nick Gates C; 71 Will Hernandez G; 66 Shane Lemieux G; 60 Kyle Murphy G; 74 Matt Peart T; 77 Spencer Pulley C; 78 Andrew Thomas T; 70 Kevin Zeitler G; Defensive linemen (DL): 95 B. J. Hill DE; 98 Austin Johnson NT; 97 Dexter Lawrence DE; 90 R. J. McIntosh DE; 94 Dalvin Tomlinson NT; 99 Leonard Williams DE	Linebackers (LB): 47 Cam Brown OLB; 35 T. J. Brunson ILB; 49 Carter Coughlin OLB; 48 Tae Crowder ILB; 52 Devante Downs ILB; 51 Kyler Fackrell OLB; 57 Niko Lalos OLB; 54 Blake Martinez ILB; 55 David Mayo ILB; 91 Jabaal Sheard OLB; Defensive backs (DB): 24 James Bradberry CB; 34 Adrian Colbert FS; 43 Nate Ebner SS; 45 Madre Harper CB; 30 Darnay Holmes CB; 20 Julian Love FS; 29 Xavier McKinney FS; 21 Jabrill Peppers SS; 23 Logan Ryan FS; 27 Isaac Yiadom CB; Special teams (ST): 9 Riley Dixon P; 5 Graham Gano K; 58 Casey Kreiter LS	Practice squad: 80 Alex Bachman WR; 93 Trent Harris OLB; 36 Montre Hartage FS; 44 Rysen John TE; 25 Taquan Mizzell RB; 96 David Moa NT; 34 Sandro Platzgummer RB (IPP); 2 Ryan Santoso K/P; 62 Chad Slade G; 3 Alex Tanney QB; 17 Clayton Thorson QB; 46 Carson Tinker LS; 89 Binjimen Victor WR; 79 Kenny Wiggins G; 38 Jarren Williams CB; 28 Quincy Wilson CB; Reserve: 26 Saquon Barkley RB (IR); 23 Sam Beal CB (Opt-out); 59 Lorenzo Carter OLB (IR); 17 Cody Core WR (IR); 31 Devonta Freeman RB (IR/DFR); 37 Ryan Lewis CB (IR); 39 Elijhaa Penny FB (IR); 18 Da'Mari Scott WR (Opt-out); 84 David Sills WR (COVID-19); 76 Nate Solder T (Opt-out); 38 Shakial Taylor CB (Opt-out); 53 Oshane Ximines OLB (IR); Rookies in italics 53 active, 12 reserve, 15 practice squad (1 exempt)

== Preseason ==
The Giants' preseason schedule was announced on May 1.

Week	Date	Opponent	Venue	Result
1	August 13	at New York Jets	MetLife Stadium	Cancelled due to the COVID-19 pandemic
2	August 22	at Tennessee Titans	Nissan Stadium	Cancelled due to the COVID-19 pandemic
3	August 29	Green Bay Packers	MetLife Stadium	Cancelled due to the COVID-19 pandemic
4	September 3	New England Patriots	MetLife Stadium	Cancelled due to the COVID-19 pandemic

== Regular season ==
=== Schedule ===
The Giants' 2020 schedule was announced on May 7.

Week	Date	Opponent	Result	Record	Venue	Recap
1	September 14	Pittsburgh Steelers	**L** 16–26	0–1	MetLife Stadium	Recap
2	September 20	at Chicago Bears	**L** 13–17	0–2	Soldier Field	Recap
3	September 27	San Francisco 49ers	**L** 9–36	0–3	MetLife Stadium	Recap
4	October 4	at Los Angeles Rams	**L** 9–17	0–4	SoFi Stadium	Recap
5	October 11	at **Dallas Cowboys**	**L** 34–37	0–5	AT&T Stadium	Recap
6	October 18	**Washington Football Team**	**W** 20–19	1–5	MetLife Stadium	Recap
7	October 22	at **Philadelphia Eagles**	**L** 21–22	1–6	Lincoln Financial Field	Recap
8	November 2	Tampa Bay Buccaneers	**L** 23–25	1–7	MetLife Stadium	Recap
9	November 8	at **Washington Football Team**	**W** 23–20	2–7	FedExField	Recap
10	November 15	**Philadelphia Eagles**	**W** 27–17	3–7	MetLife Stadium	Recap
11	Bye					
12	November 29	at Cincinnati Bengals	**W** 19–17	4–7	Paul Brown Stadium	Recap
13	December 6	at Seattle Seahawks	**W** 17–12	5–7	Lumen Field	Recap
14	December 13	Arizona Cardinals	**L** 7–26	5–8	MetLife Stadium	Recap
15	December 20	Cleveland Browns	**L** 6–20	5–9	MetLife Stadium	Recap
16	December 27	at Baltimore Ravens	**L** 13–27	5–10	M&T Bank Stadium	Recap
17	January 3	**Dallas Cowboys**	**W** 23–19	6–10	MetLife Stadium	Recap

Note: Intra-division opponents are in bold text.

=== Game summaries ===
==== Week 1: vs. Pittsburgh Steelers ====
Week One: Pittsburgh Steelers at New York Giants – Game summary

Quarter	1	2	3	4	Total
**Steelers**	3	13	0	10	**26**
Giants	3	7	0	6	**16**

at MetLife Stadium, East Rutherford, New Jersey

- Date: September 14
- Game time: 7:10 p.m. EDT
- Game weather: Clear, 71 °F (22 °C)
- Game attendance: 0
- Referee: Craig Wrolstad
- TV announcers (ESPN): Chris Fowler, Kirk Herbstreit and Maria Taylor
- Recap, Game Book

Game information

**First quarter**

- NYG – Graham Gano 21-yard field goal, 10:34. Giants 3–0. **Drive: 4 plays, 1 yard, 0:50.**
- PIT – Chris Boswell 41-yard field goal, 0:49. Tied 3–3. **Drive: 13 plays, 59 yards, 6:11.**

**Second quarter**

- NYG – Darius Slayton 41-yard pass from Daniel Jones (Graham Gano kick), 13:45. Giants 10–3. **Drive: 6 plays, 75 yards, 2:04.**
- PIT – JuJu Smith-Schuster 10-yard pass from Ben Roethlisberger (kick missed), 9:01. Giants 10–9. **Drive: 6 plays, 36 yards, 3:34.**
- PIT – James Washington 13-yard pass from Ben Roethlisberger (Chris Boswell kick), 0:07. Steelers 16–10. **Drive: 8 plays, 78 yards, 1:25.**

**Third quarter**

- No scoring plays.

**Fourth quarter**

- PIT – Chris Boswell 36-yard field goal, 14:19. Steelers 19–10. **Drive: 9 plays, 62 yards, 3:58.**
- PIT – JuJu Smith-Schuster 8-yard pass from Ben Roethlisberger (Chris Boswell kick), 5:23. Steelers 26–10. **Drive: 11 plays, 75 yards, 7:00.**
- NYG – Darius Slayton 7-yard pass from Daniel Jones (pass failed), 1:52. Steelers 26–16. **Drive: 13 plays, 75 yards, 3:31.**

**Top passers**

- PIT – Ben Roethlisberger – 21/32, 229 yards, 3 TD
- NYG – Daniel Jones – 26/41, 279 yards, 2 TD, 2 INT

**Top rushers**

- PIT – Benny Snell – 19 rushes, 113 yards
- NYG – Daniel Jones – 4 rushes, 22 yards

**Top receivers**

- PIT – JuJu Smith-Schuster – 6 receptions, 69 yards, 2 TD
- NYG – Darius Slayton – 6 receptions, 102 yards, 2 TD

The Giants lost their first game in the post-Eli Manning era. They suffered their 4th consecutive loss in a season opener, and became 3–8 in home openers since moving to MetLife Stadium.

The Giants opened up strong, taking a 10–3 lead on the first play of the 2nd quarter when Daniel Jones connected with Darius Slayton for a 41-yard score. T. J. Watt forced an interception of Jones which sparked two Steelers touchdown drives before halftime. In the 3rd quarter, on the 19th play of an 87-yard drive, Jones was hit by Bud Dupree and forced a goal-line interception, which the Steelers kicked a field goal to make it a 2 possession game. JuJu Smith-Schuster scored his second touchdown in the 4th quarter for the Steelers to take a commanding 26–10 lead. Slayton scored his second touchdown with 1:52 remaining, but the Steelers sealed the victory when they stopped the Giants 2-point conversion attempt and recovered the onside kick.

==== Week 2: at Chicago Bears ====
Week Two: New York Giants at Chicago Bears – Game summary

Quarter	1	2	3	4	Total
Giants	0	0	3	10	**13**
**Bears**	10	7	0	0	**17**

at Soldier Field, Chicago, Illinois

- Date: September 20
- Game time: 1:00 p.m. EDT/12:00 p.m. CDT
- Game weather: 66 °F (19 °C)
- Game attendance: 0
- Referee: Bill Vinovich
- TV announcers (CBS): Ian Eagle, Charles Davis and Evan Washburn
- Recap, Game Book

Game information

**First quarter**

- CHI – David Montgomery 28-yard pass from Mitchell Trubisky (Cairo Santos kick), 7:25. Bears 7–0. **Drive: 12 plays, 82 yards, 7:35.**
- CHI – Cairo Santos 34-yard field goal, 4:36. Bears 10–0. **Drive: 4 plays, 4 yards, 1:36.**

**Second quarter**

- CHI – Darnell Mooney 15-yard pass from Mitchell Trubisky (Cairo Santos kick), 0:14. Bears 17–0. **Drive: 11 plays, 80 yards, 5:15.**

**Third quarter**

- NYG – Graham Gano 39-yard field goal, 9:50. Bears 17–3. **Drive: 4 plays, 4 yards, 1:32.**

**Fourth quarter**

- NYG – Dion Lewis 1-yard run, 14:18. Bears 17–10. **Drive: 11 plays, 95 yards, 4:39.**
- NYG – Graham Gano 37-yard field goal, 7:43. Bears 17–13. **Drive: 10 plays, 47 yards, 4:31.**

**Top passers**

- NYG – Daniel Jones – 25/40, 241 yards, INT
- CHI – Mitchell Trubisky – 18/28, 190 yards, 2 TD, 2 INT

**Top rushers**

- NYG – Saquon Barkley – 4 rushes, 28 yards
- CHI – David Montgomery – 16 rushes, 82 yards

**Top receivers**

- NYG – Evan Engram – 6 receptions, 65 yards
- CHI – David Montgomery – 3 receptions, 45 yards, TD

The Giants came out flat, surrendering a 12 play, 82-yard opening touchdown drive that lasted half the first quarter. Saquon Barkley suffered a season ending ACL injury on the first play of the second quarter, and Daniel Jones later threw a costly red zone interception to end the drive. They would also lose Sterling Shepard to a toe injury.

Down 17–0, the Giants tightened up their defensive play in the second half, forcing two interceptions from Bears quarterback Mitchell Trubisky and getting back in the game. In the final 2:02 down 17–13, Daniel Jones tried to complete a comeback and led the offense to the Bears' 10-yard line, but could not score as time expired, so the Giants started 0–2 for the 4th consecutive year.

==== Week 3: vs. San Francisco 49ers ====
Week Three: San Francisco 49ers at New York Giants – Game summary

Quarter	1	2	3	4	Total
**49ers**	6	10	7	13	**36**
Giants	0	6	3	0	**9**

at MetLife Stadium, East Rutherford, New Jersey

- Date: September 27
- Game time: 1:00 p.m. EDT
- Game weather: Mostly cloudy, 75 °F (24 °C)
- Game attendance: 0
- Referee: Clay Martin
- TV announcers (Fox): Kevin Burkhardt, Daryl Johnston and Pam Oliver
- Recap, Game Book

Game information

**First quarter**

- SF – Robbie Gould 52-yard field goal, 9:43. 49ers 3–0. **Drive: 10 plays, 41 yards, 5:17.**
- SF – Robbie Gould 32-yard field goal, 1:05. 49ers 6–0. **Drive: 12 plays, 28 yards, 5:22.**

**Second quarter**

- NYG – Graham Gano 52-yard field goal, 13:35. 49ers 6–3. **Drive: 7 plays, 41 yards, 2:30.**
- NYG – Graham Gano 42-yard field goal, 7:30. Tied 6–6. **Drive: 6 plays, 31 yards, 1:37.**
- SF – Jerick McKinnon 10-yard run (Robbie Gould kick), 1:07. 49ers 13–6. **Drive: 12 plays, 75 yards, 6:18.**
- SF – Robbie Gould 26-yard field goal, 0:06. 49ers 16–6. **Drive: 4 plays, 24 yards, 0:53.**

**Third quarter**

- NYG – Graham Gano 47-yard field goal, 8:11. 49ers 16–9. **Drive: 13 plays, 53 yards, 6:49.**
- SF – Brandon Aiyuk 19-yard run (Robbie Gould kick), 3:14. 49ers 23–9. **Drive: 8 plays, 75 yards, 4:52.**

**Fourth quarter**

- SF – Jeff Wilson 19-yard pass from Nick Mullens (pass failed), 13:28. 49ers 29–9. **Drive: 4 plays, 30 yards, 2:16.**
- SF – Jeff Wilson 2-yard run (Robbie Gould Kick), 3:35. 49ers 36–9. **Drive: 15 plays, 92 yards, 8:21.**

**Top passers**

- SF – Nick Mullens – 25/36, 343 yards, TD
- NYG – Daniel Jones – 17/32, 179 yards, INT

**Top rushers**

- SF – Jerick McKinnon – 14 rushes, 38 yards, TD
- NYG – Daniel Jones – 5 rushes, 49 yards

**Top receivers**

- SF – Brandon Aiyuk – 5 receptions, 70 yards
- NYG – Darius Slayton – 3 receptions, 53 yards

With the loss, the Giants fell to 0–3 for the first time since 2017. The 49ers did not punt once the entire game while the Giants only mustered 231 total yards. Daniel Jones had multiple turnovers for the third game in a row.

==== Week 4: at Los Angeles Rams ====
Week Four: New York Giants at Los Angeles Rams – Game summary

Quarter	1	2	3	4	Total
Giants	0	6	0	3	**9**
**Rams**	7	3	0	7	**17**

at SoFi Stadium, Inglewood, California

- Date: October 4
- Game time: 4:05 p.m. EDT/1:05 p.m. PDT
- Game weather: Sunny, 86 °F (30 °C)
- Game attendance: 0
- Referee: John Hussey
- TV announcers (Fox): Adam Amin, Mark Schlereth and Lindsay Czarniak
- Recap, Game Book

Game information

**First quarter**

- LAR – Gerald Everett 2-yard run (Sam Sloman kick), 6:19. Rams 7–0. **Drive: 12 plays, 65 yards, 7:01.**

**Second quarter**

- NYG – Graham Gano 35-yard field goal, 14:51. Rams 7–3. **Drive: 6 plays, 17 yards, 2:54.**
- LAR – Sam Sloman 32-yard field goal, 3:52. Rams 10–3. **Drive: 15 plays, 47 yards, 7:14.**
- NYG – Graham Gano 37-yard field goal, 0:00. Rams 10–6. **Drive: 13 plays, 56 yards, 3:52.**

**Third quarter**

- No scoring plays.

**Fourth quarter**

- NYG – Graham Gano 27-yard field goal, 14:11. Rams 10–9. **Drive: 11 plays, 48 yards, 6:14.**
- LAR – Cooper Kupp 55-yard pass from Jared Goff (Sam Sloman kick), 6:56. Rams 17–9. **Drive: 8 plays, 91 yards, 2:50.**

**Top passers**

- NYG – Daniel Jones – 23/36, 190 yards
- LAR – Jared Goff – 25/32, 200 yards, TD

**Top rushers**

- NYG – Wayne Gallman – 6 rushes, 45 yards
- LAR – Malcolm Brown – 9 rushes, 37 yards

**Top receivers**

- NYG – Darius Slayton – 3 receptions, 48 yards
- LAR – Cooper Kupp – 5 receptions, 69 yards, TD

Daniel Jones tried to mount a game-tying drive but threw an interception in Rams territory to seal the loss. It was his 7th turnover in 4 games. The Giants fell to 0–4 for the first time since 2017 and failed to score a touchdown for the second consecutive game.

==== Week 5: at Dallas Cowboys ====
Week Five: New York Giants at Dallas Cowboys – Game summary

Quarter	1	2	3	4	Total
Giants	14	6	3	11	**34**
**Cowboys**	3	21	7	6	**37**

at AT&T Stadium, Arlington, Texas

- Date: October 11
- Game time: 4:25 p.m. EDT/3:25 p.m. CDT
- Game weather: Clear, 95 °F (35 °C) (retractable roof open)
- Game attendance: 25,147
- Referee: Craig Wrolstad
- TV announcers (CBS): Jim Nantz, Tony Romo and Tracy Wolfson
- Recap, Game Book

Game information

**First quarter**

- DAL – Greg Zuerlein 24-yard field goal, 11:20. Cowboys 3–0. **Drive: 11 plays, 54 yards, 3:40.**
- NYG – Evan Engram 3-yard run (Graham Gano kick), 6:53. Giants 7–3. **Drive: 7 plays, 70 yards, 4:27.**
- NYG – Kyler Fackrell 46-yard interception return (Graham Gano kick), 5:48. Giants 14–3.

**Second quarter**

- NYG – Graham Gano 55-yard field goal, 13:30. Giants 17–3. **Drive: 12 plays, 38 yards, 5:51.**
- DAL – Ezekiel Elliott 1-yard run (Greg Zuerlein kick), 6:31. Giants 17–10. **Drive: 14 plays, 70 yards, 6:59.**
- DAL – Anthony Brown 29-yard fumble return (Greg Zuerlein kick), 5:00. Tied 17–17.
- NYG – Graham Gano 50-yard field goal, 0:51. Giants 20–17. **Drive: 9 plays, 48 yards, 4:09.**
- DAL – Dak Prescott 11-yard pass from Cedrick Wilson Jr. (Greg Zuerlein kick), 0:16. Cowboys 24–20. **Drive: 6 plays, 64 yards, 0:35.**

**Third quarter**

- NYG – Graham Gano 54-yard field goal, 9:25. Cowboys 24–23. **Drive: 10 plays, 39 yards, 5:35.**
- DAL – Ezekiel Elliott 12-yard run (Greg Zuerlein kick), 5:03. Cowboys 31–23. **Drive: 10 plays, 79 yards, 4:22.**

**Fourth quarter**

- NYG – Graham Gano 28-yard field goal, 11:09. Cowboys 31–26. **Drive: 9 plays, 66 yards, 5:11.**
- NYG – Devonta Freeman 4-yard run (Daniel Jones-Andrew Thomas pass), 8:46. Giants 34–31. **Drive: 5 plays, 17 yards, 2:09.**
- DAL – Greg Zuerlein 40-yard field goal, 1:56. Tied 34–34. **Drive: 12 plays, 38 yards, 6:50.**
- DAL – Greg Zuerlein 34-yard field goal, 0:00. Cowboys 37–34. **Drive: 5 plays, 72 yards, 0:52.**

**Top passers**

- NYG – Daniel Jones – 20/33, 222 yards
- DAL – Dak Prescott – 14/21, 166 yards, INT

**Top rushers**

- NYG – Devonta Freeman – 17 rushes, 60 yards, TD
- DAL – Ezekiel Elliott – 19 rushes, 91 yards, 2 TD

**Top receivers**

- NYG – Darius Slayton – 8 receptions, 129 yards
- DAL – CeeDee Lamb – 8 receptions, 124 yards

The Giants blew a 14-point lead in the second quarter. Daniel Jones' fumbling woes continued after he was sacked by the Cowboys' Anthony Brown who returned that same fumble for a touchdown. The Giants briefly regained the lead with 8:46 left in the 4th quarter after Cowboys quarterback Dak Prescott suffered a season-ending ankle injury, but their defense could not hang on against backup quarterback Andy Dalton. The Cowboys kicked a game-winning field goal to drop the still-winless Giants to 0–5 and two games behind the 2–3 Cowboys.

==== Week 6: vs. Washington Football Team ====
Week Six: Washington Football Team at New York Giants – Game summary

Quarter	1	2	3	4	Total
Washington	0	10	0	9	**19**
**Giants**	10	3	0	7	**20**

at MetLife Stadium, East Rutherford, New Jersey

- Date: October 18
- Game time: 1:00 p.m. EDT
- Game weather: Partly cloudy, 62 °F (17 °C)
- Game attendance: 0
- Referee: Brad Allen
- TV announcers (Fox): Adam Amin, Mark Schlereth and Lindsay Czarniak
- Recap, Game Book

Game information

**First quarter**

- NYG – Graham Gano 33-yard field goal, 3:23. Giants 3–0. **Drive: 9 plays, 48 yards, 5:31.**
- NYG – Darius Slayton 23-yard pass from Daniel Jones (Graham Gano kick), 1:36. Giants 10–0. **Drive: 3 plays, 27 yards, 0:55.**

**Second quarter**

- WAS – Dustin Hopkins 35-yard field goal, 10:50. Giants 10–3. **Drive: 11 plays, 70 yards, 5:46.**
- NYG – Graham Gano 20-yard field goal, 6:15. Giants 13–3. **Drive: 8 plays, 73 yards, 4:35.**
- WAS – Logan Thomas 5-yard pass from Kyle Allen (Dustin Hopkins kick), 0:13. Giants 13–10. **Drive: 13 plays, 70 yards, 6:02.**

**Third quarter**

- No scoring plays

**Fourth quarter**

- WAS – Dustin Hopkins 28-yard field goal, 8:56. Tied 13–13. **Drive: 14 plays, 70 yards, 6:55.**
- NYG – Tae Crowder 43-yard fumble return (Graham Gano kick), 3:29. Giants 20–13. **Drive: 7 plays, 22 yards, 3:28.**
- WAS – Cam Sims 22-yard pass from Kyle Allen (Two-point conversion failed), 0:36. Giants 20–19. **Drive: 10 plays, 75 yards, 2:53.**

**Top passers**

- WAS – Kyle Allen – 31/42, 280 yards, 2 TD, INT
- NYG – Daniel Jones – 12/19, 112 yards, TD, INT

**Top rushers**

- WAS – J. D. McKissic – 8 rushes, 41 yards,
- NYG – Daniel Jones – 7 rushes, 74 yards

**Top receivers**

- WAS – Terry McLaurin – 7 receptions, 74 yards
- NYG – Darius Slayton – 2 receptions, 41 yards, TD

Tae Crowder, the last pick in the 2020 NFL draft, recovered a fumble and ran 43 yards for the go-ahead score with 3:29 remaining. After responding with a touchdown to make it 20–19, Washington head coach Ron Rivera chose to go for the 2-point conversion, and the win. The Giants stopped Washington's conversion attempt, guaranteeing Joe Judge his first win as an NFL head coach.

==== Week 7: at Philadelphia Eagles ====
Week Seven: New York Giants at Philadelphia Eagles – Game summary

Quarter	1	2	3	4	Total
Giants	7	0	7	7	**21**
**Eagles**	7	3	0	12	**22**

at Lincoln Financial Field, Philadelphia, Pennsylvania

- Date: October 22
- Game time: 8:20 p.m. EDT
- Game weather: Clear, 70 °F (21 °C)
- Game attendance: 5,000
- Referee: Adrian Hill
- TV announcers (Fox/NFLN/Amazon Prime): Joe Buck, Troy Aikman, Erin Andrews and Kristina Pink
- Recap, Game Book

Game information

**First quarter**

- PHI – Carson Wentz 1-yard run (Jake Elliott kick), 8:45. Eagles 7–0. **Drive: 11 plays, 75 yards, 6:15.**
- NYG – Golden Tate 39-yard pass from Daniel Jones (Graham Gano kick), 4:13. Tied 7–7. **Drive: 1 play, 39 yards, 0:07.**

**Second quarter**

- PHI – Jake Elliott 31-yard field goal, 13:28. Eagles 10–7. **Drive: 13 plays, 57 yards, 5:45.**

**Third quarter**

- NYG – Wayne Gallman 1-yard run (Graham Gano kick), 6:45. Giants 14–10. **Drive: 4 plays, 88 yards, 2:06.**

**Fourth quarter**

- NYG – Sterling Shepard 2-yard pass from Daniel Jones (Graham Gano kick), 6:17. Giants 21–10. **Drive: 15 plays, 97 yards, 7:50.**
- PHI – Greg Ward 3-yard pass from Carson Wentz (run failed), 4:38. Giants 21–16. **Drive: 4 plays, 78 yards, 1:39.**
- PHI – Boston Scott 18-yard pass from Carson Wentz (pass failed), 0:40. Eagles 22–21. **Drive: 6 plays, 71 yards, 1:22.**

**Top passers**

- NYG – Daniel Jones – 20/30, 187 yards, 2 TD, INT
- PHI – Carson Wentz – 25/43, 359 yards, 2 TD, INT

**Top rushers**

- NYG – Daniel Jones – 4 rushes, 92 yards
- PHI – Boston Scott – 12 rushes, 46 yards

**Top receivers**

- NYG – Sterling Shepard – 6 receptions, 59 yards, TD
- PHI – Richard Rodgers – 6 receptions, 85 yards

After a slow start in the first half, the Giants gained momentum to take a 21–10 fourth-quarter lead. However, several mishaps would ensue for New York, including late penalties and a critical drop by Evan Engram in the 4th quarter at the Eagles 25 yard line. Philadelphia capitalized on the momentum swing and scored two unanswered touchdowns for a 22–21 lead with 40 seconds left in regulation. With one last chance to drive for a potential game-winning field goal, Daniel Jones was strip-sacked by Brandon Graham on second down. The Eagles recovered the loose ball, sealing New York's fate. The heartbreaking loss dropped the Giants to 1–6 on the season and extended their losing streak against the Eagles to eight games dating back to Week 9 of the 2016 season.

==== Week 8: vs. Tampa Bay Buccaneers ====
Week Eight: Tampa Bay Buccaneers at New York Giants – Game summary

Quarter	1	2	3	4	Total
**Buccaneers**	3	3	9	10	**25**
Giants	7	7	3	6	**23**

at MetLife Stadium, East Rutherford, New Jersey

- Date: November 2
- Game time: 8:15 p.m. EST
- Game weather: Fair, 39 °F (4 °C)
- Game attendance: 0
- Referee: Brad Rogers
- TV announcers (ESPN): Steve Levy, Brian Griese, Louis Riddick, Lisa Salters and John Parry
- Recap, Game Book

Game information

**First quarter**

- TB – Ryan Succop 37-yard field goal, 9:41. Buccaneers 3–0. **Drive: 11 plays, 57 yards, 5:19.**
- NYG – Dion Lewis 7-yard pass from Daniel Jones (Graham Gano kick), 4:10. Giants 7–3. **Drive: 3 plays, 12 yards, 0:44.**

**Second quarter**

- NYG – Wayne Gallman 2-yard run (Graham Gano kick), 1:46. Giants 14–3. **Drive: 10 plays, 77 yards, 3:13.**
- TB – Ryan Succop 40-yard field goal, 0:07. Giants 14–6. **Drive: 8 plays, 53 yards, 1:39.**

**Third quarter**

- TB – Ryan Succop 43-yard field goal, 10:00. Giants 14–9. **Drive: 10 plays, 34 yards, 4:03.**
- TB – Rob Gronkowski 3-yard pass from Tom Brady (pass failed), 6:00. Buccaneers 15–14. **Drive: 5 plays, 67 yards, 2:36.**
- NYG – Graham Gano 33-yard field goal, 0:36. Giants 17–15. **Drive: 10 plays, 56 yards, 5:45.**

**Fourth quarter**

- TB – Mike Evans 8-yard pass from Tom Brady (Ryan Succop kick), 9:02. Buccaneers 22–17. **Drive: 6 plays, 66 yards, 3:04.**
- TB – Ryan Succop 38-yard field goal, 3:41. Buccaneers 25–17. **Drive: 8 plays, 47 yards, 3:16.**
- NYG – Golden Tate 19-yard pass from Daniel Jones (pass failed), 0:28. Buccaneers 25–23. **Drive: 13 plays, 70 yards, 3:13.**

**Top passers**

- TB – Tom Brady – 28/40, 279 yards, 2 TD
- NYG – Daniel Jones – 25/41, 256 yards, 2 TD, 2 INT

**Top rushers**

- TB – Leonard Fournette – 15 rushes, 52 yards,
- NYG – Wayne Gallman – 12 rushes, 44 yards, TD

**Top receivers**

- TB – Mike Evans – 5 receptions, 55 yards, TD
- NYG – Sterling Shepard – 8 receptions, 74 yards

Despite leading 17–15 heading into the fourth quarter, more miscues haunted the Giants as the defense allowed Tom Brady to score 10 points and quickly fell behind 25–17. Despite the miscues, the Giants drove down the field with Daniel Jones finding Golden Tate in the endzone with 28 seconds left. However, during the two-point conversion, controversy arose after the referees picked up a flag for an Antoine Winfield Jr. pass interference on Dion Lewis in the endzone as Winfield made a deflection on a Daniel Jones pass. This forced the Giants to attempt an onside kick and could not recover the kick ending the game. The Giants dropped 1–7 for the third time in four seasons.

==== Week 9: at Washington Football Team ====
Week Nine: New York Giants at Washington Football Team – Game summary

Quarter	1	2	3	4	Total
**Giants**	10	10	3	0	**23**
Washington	0	3	7	10	**20**

at FedExField, Landover, Maryland

- Date: November 8
- Game time: 1:00 p.m. EST
- Game weather: Sunny, 75 °F (24 °C)
- Game attendance: 3,000
- Referee: Shawn Hochuli
- TV announcers (Fox): Kenny Albert, Jonathan Vilma and Shannon Spake
- Recap, Game Book

Game information

**First quarter**

- NYG – Graham Gano 38-yard field goal, 9:35. Giants 3–0. **Drive: 7 plays, 61 yards, 2:14.**
- NYG – Wayne Gallman 2-yard run (Graham Gano kick), 4:15. Giants 10–0. **Drive: 4 plays, 16 yards, 0:58.**

**Second quarter**

- WAS – Dustin Hopkins 48-yard field goal, 13:05. Giants 10–3. **Drive: 9 plays, 44 yards, 6:10.**
- NYG – Graham Gano 48-yard field goal, 9:24. Giants 13–3. **Drive: 9 plays, 45 yards, 3:41.**
- NYG – Evan Engram 16-yard pass from Daniel Jones (Graham Gano kick), 2:05. Giants 20–3. **Drive: 10 plays, 77 yards, 4:53.**

**Third quarter**

- WAS – Antonio Gibson 1-yard run (Dustin Hopkins kick), 12:24. Giants 20–10. **Drive: 6 plays, 75 yards, 2:36.**
- NYG – Graham Gano 42-yard field goal, 5:12. Giants 23–10. **Drive: 12 plays, 51 yards, 7:12.**

**Fourth quarter**

- WAS – Dustin Hopkins 44-yard field goal, 14:56. Giants 23–13. **Drive: 9 plays, 53 yards, 5:16.**
- WAS – Terry McLaurin 68-yard pass from Alex Smith (Dustin Hopkins kick), 10:24. Giants 23–20. **Drive: 3 plays, 84 yards, 1:00.**

**Top passers**

- NYG – Daniel Jones – 23/34, 212 yards, TD
- WAS – Alex Smith – 24/32, 325 yards, TD, 3 INT

**Top rushers**

- NYG – Wayne Gallman – 14 rushes, 68 yards, TD
- WAS – Antonio Gibson – 6 rushes, 20 yards, TD

**Top receivers**

- NYG – Austin Mack – 4 receptions, 72 yards
- WAS – Terry McLaurin – 7 receptions, 115 yards, TD

The Giants took an early lead and never trailed. Washington fought back from a 20–3 deficit and cut the lead to 23–20. However, two late interceptions allowed the Giants victory and swept Washington for the second straight year to improve to 2–7. The Giants had 5 total takeaways and did not turn the ball over for the first time in the season and extended their winning streak against Washington to 5 games. The Giants were the only NFC East team to defeat Washington in the 2020 season.

==== Week 10: vs. Philadelphia Eagles ====
Week Ten: Philadelphia Eagles at New York Giants – Game summary

Quarter	1	2	3	4	Total
Eagles	3	0	14	0	**17**
**Giants**	7	7	7	6	**27**

at MetLife Stadium, East Rutherford, New Jersey

- Date: November 15
- Game time: 1:00 p.m. EST
- Game weather: Mostly cloudy, 56 °F (13 °C)
- Game attendance: 0
- Referee: Clay Martin
- TV announcers (Fox): Kevin Kugler, Chris Spielman and Laura Okmin
- Recap, Game Book

Game information

**First quarter**

- NYG – Daniel Jones 34-yard run (Graham Gano kick), 11:11. Giants 7–0. **Drive: 8 plays, 85 yards, 3:49.**
- PHI – Jake Elliott 40-yard field goal, 6:27. Giants 7–3. **Drive: 12 plays, 53 yards, 4:44.**

**Second quarter**

- NYG – Wayne Gallman 2-yard run (Graham Gano kick), 14:57. Giants 14–3. **Drive: 13 plays, 75 yards, 6:30.**

**Third quarter**

- PHI – Boston Scott 56-yard run (Miles Sanders run), 12:31. Giants 14–11. **Drive: 5 plays, 84 yards, 2:29.**
- NYG – Wayne Gallman 1-yard run (Graham Gano kick), 9:49. Giants 21–11. **Drive: 6 plays, 75 yards, 2:42.**
- PHI – Corey Clement 5-yard run (pass failed), 5:20. Giants 21–17. **Drive: 8 plays, 75 yards, 4:29.**

**Fourth quarter**

- NYG – Graham Gano 35-yard field goal, 7:45. Giants 24–17. **Drive: 6 plays, 24 yards, 3:17.**
- NYG – Graham Gano 44-yard field goal, 3:06. Giants 27–17. **Drive: 6 plays, 38 yards, 1:46.**

**Top passers**

- PHI – Carson Wentz – 21/37, 208 yards
- NYG – Daniel Jones – 21/28, 244 yards

**Top rushers**

- PHI – Miles Sanders – 15 rushes, 85 yards
- NYG – Daniel Jones – 9 rushes, 64 yards, TD

**Top receivers**

- PHI – Richard Rodgers – 4 receptions, 60 yards
- NYG – Darius Slayton – 5 receptions, 93 yards

With this win, the Giants avenged their Week 7 loss and improved to 3–7 on the season. The Giants did not turn the ball over for the second straight game and did not force any turnovers on defense. The victory also snapped an 8-game losing streak to the Eagles, dating back to Week 9 of the 2016 season. After the game, the Giants extended kicker Graham Gano $14 million through the 2023 NFL season.

==== Week 12: at Cincinnati Bengals ====
Week Twelve: New York Giants at Cincinnati Bengals – Game summary

Quarter	1	2	3	4	Total
**Giants**	7	3	3	6	**19**
Bengals	7	3	0	7	**17**

at Paul Brown Stadium, Cincinnati, Ohio

- Date: November 29
- Game time: 1:00 p.m. EST
- Game weather: Mostly cloudy, 52 °F (11 °C)
- Game attendance: 10,208
- Referee: Carl Cheffers
- TV announcers (Fox): Kevin Kugler, Chris Spielman and Laura Okmin
- Recap, Game Book

Game information

**First quarter**

- NYG – Wayne Gallman 1-yard run (Graham Gano kick), 10:01. Giants 7–0. **Drive: 9 plays, 76 yards, 4:59.**
- CIN – Brandon Wilson 103-yard kickoff return, 9:50. Tied 7–7.

**Second quarter**

- CIN – Randy Bullock 44-yard field goal, 3:32. Bengals 10–7. **Drive: 9 plays, 29 yards, 5:08.**
- NYG – Graham Gano 49-yard field goal, 0:21. Tied 10–10. **Drive: 11 plays, 44 yards, 3:11.**

**Third quarter**

- NYG – Graham Gano 40-yard field goal, 8:06. Giants 13–10. **Drive: 11 plays, 72 yards, 5:10.**

**Fourth quarter**

- NYG – Graham Gano 39-yard field goal, 11:35. Giants 16–10. **Drive: 8 plays, 19 yards, 3:57.**
- NYG – Graham Gano 32-yard field goal, 3:54. Giants 19–10. **Drive: 4 plays, 5 yards, 0:18.**
- CIN – Tee Higgins 1-yard pass from Brandon Allen (Randy Bullock kick), 2:33. Giants 19–17. **Drive: 7 plays, 72 yards, 1:21.**

**Top passers**

- NYG – Daniel Jones – 16/27, 213 yards
- CIN – Brandon Allen – 17/29, 136 yards, TD, INT

**Top rushers**

- NYG – Wayne Gallman – 24 rushes, 94 yards, TD
- CIN – Giovani Bernard – 8 rushes, 32 yards

**Top receivers**

- NYG – Evan Engram – 6 receptions, 129 yards
- CIN – Tee Higgins – 5 receptions, 44 yards, TD

The Giants opened up with a Wayne Gallman touchdown on 4th and goal, set up by a 53-yard completion from Jones to Evan Engram. The Bengals returned the ensuing kickoff for a touchdown of their own and the halftime score was 10-10. The Giants defense forced three turnovers in the 2nd half, the first an interception by Niko Lalos, a rookie from Dartmouth making his NFL debut, and a forced fumble later by Logan Ryan which he also recovered. The Bengals cut into the Giants' 19–10 lead in the final minutes and had a chance to win the game on the final drive, but backup quarterback Brandon Allen was sacked by Jabaal Sheard and lost the ball, which was recovered by the Giants. Daniel Jones injured his hamstring in the win.

With the win, the Giants became the third NFL team to win 700 regular season games (only behind the Bears and Packers) and won in Cincinnati for the first time in franchise history.

==== Week 13: at Seattle Seahawks ====
Week Thirteen: New York Giants at Seattle Seahawks – Game summary

Quarter	1	2	3	4	Total
**Giants**	0	0	14	3	**17**
Seahawks	3	2	0	7	**12**

at Lumen Field, Seattle, Washington

- Date: December 6
- Game time: 4:05 p.m. EST/1:05 p.m. PST
- Game weather: Cloudy, 51 °F (11 °C)
- Game attendance: 0
- Referee: Craig Wrolstad
- TV announcers (Fox): Adam Amin, Mark Schlereth and Lindsay Czarniak
- Recap, Game Book

Game information

**First quarter**

- SEA – Jason Myers 31-yard field goal, 11:50. Seahawks 3–0. **Drive: 9 plays, 57 yards, 3:10**

**Second quarter**

- SEA – Punt blocked by Ryan Neal out-of-bounds in end zone, 0:28. Seahawks 5–0. **Drive: 3 plays, 6 yards, 0:20.**

**Third quarter**

- NYG – Alfred Morris 4-yard run (Colt McCoy–Sterling Shepard pass), 7:40. Giants 8–5. **Drive: 4 plays, 80 yards, 2:07.**
- NYG – Alfred Morris 6-yard pass from Colt McCoy (kick failed), 2:29. Giants 14–5. **Drive: 5 plays, 48 yards, 2:37.**

**Fourth quarter**

- NYG – Graham Gano 48-yard field goal, 9:50. Giants 17–5. **Drive: 4 plays, 9 yards, 1:31.**
- SEA – Chris Carson 28-yard pass from Russell Wilson (Jason Myers kick), 6:09. Giants 17–12. **Drive: 11 plays, 82 yards, 3:41.**

**Top passers**

- NYG – Colt McCoy – 13/22, 105 yards, TD, INT
- SEA – Russell Wilson – 27/43, 236 yards, TD, INT

**Top rushers**

- NYG – Wayne Gallman – 16 rushes, 135 yards
- SEA – Chris Carson – 13 rushes, 65 yards

**Top receivers**

- NYG – Evan Engram – 4 receptions, 32 yards
- SEA – DK Metcalf – 5 receptions, 80 yards

The Giants did not have Daniel Jones as their starting quarterback and were double-digit underdogs going into a cross-country battle with the Seahawks. In only his second appearance with the team and first start, Colt McCoy and the Giants shocked the NFL with one of the biggest upsets of the 2020 season. McCoy won his first game as a starting quarterback since October 27, 2014, when he was with the Washington Redskins. Many New York Giants fans consider this what's known as the “Colt McCoy Legacy Game” due to his age, reputation, and unexpectedness of success, especially against formidable foe such as the Seahawks. The Giants defense contained Russell Wilson all game long, sacking him 5 times and forcing 2 takeaways. Seattle was leading 5–0 at halftime, but in the third quarter, the Giants' rushing attack broke through with a 60-yard run by Wayne Gallman which set up two Alfred Morris touchdowns on back-to-back possessions. With a 17–12 lead and under two minutes to play, the defense was able to stop Wilson one last time. With the upset win, the Giants improved to 5–7, beat the Seahawks for the first time since 2010, and earned their longest winning streak since 2016. In addition, New York would take sole possession of first place in the NFC East, though the Washington Football Team would move back into a first-place tie with the Giants the following night with a bigger upset win over the undefeated Pittsburgh Steelers.

==== Week 14: vs. Arizona Cardinals ====
Week Fourteen: Arizona Cardinals at New York Giants – Game summary

Quarter	1	2	3	4	Total
**Cardinals**	3	10	7	6	**26**
Giants	0	0	7	0	**7**

at MetLife Stadium, East Rutherford, New Jersey

- Date: December 13
- Game time: 1:00 p.m. EST
- Game weather: Fair, 59 °F (15 °C)
- Game attendance: 0
- Referee: Ronald Torbert
- TV announcers (Fox): Kenny Albert, Jonathan Vilma and Shannon Spake
- Recap, Game Book

Game information

**First quarter**

- ARI – Mike Nugent 34-yard field goal, 6:30. Cardinals 3–0. **Drive: 6 plays, 22 yards, 2:33.**

**Second quarter**

- ARI – Mike Nugent 37-yard field goal, 8:24. Cardinals 6–0. **Drive: 11 plays, 34 yards, 5:35.**
- ARI – Dan Arnold 7-yard pass from Kyler Murray (Mike Nugent kick), 6:53. Cardinals 13–0. **Drive: 4 plays, 21 yards, 1:24.**

**Third quarter**

- ARI – Kenyan Drake 1-yard run (Mike Nugent kick), 8:52. Cardinals 20–0. **Drive: 11 plays, 77 yards, 6:08.**
- NYG – Dion Lewis 1-yard run (Graham Gano kick), 5:38. Cardinals 20–7. **Drive: 7 plays, 75 yards, 3:14.**

**Fourth quarter**

- ARI – Mike Nugent 34-yard field goal, 12:38. Cardinals 23–7. **Drive: 8 plays, 34 yards, 3:01.**
- ARI – Mike Nugent 30-yard field goal, 2:41. Cardinals 26–7. **Drive: 7 plays, 21 yards, 2:36.**

**Top passers**

- ARI – Kyler Murray – 24/35, 244 yards, TD
- NYG – Daniel Jones – 11/21, 127 yards

**Top rushers**

- ARI – Kenyan Drake – 23 rushes, 80 yards, TD
- NYG – Wayne Gallman – 12 rushes, 57 yards

**Top receivers**

- ARI – DeAndre Hopkins – 9 receptions, 136 yards
- NYG – Golden Tate – 1 reception, 39 yards

The Giants average starting field position was from their own 17-yard line while the Cardinals' started from their own 47-yard line all game. The Giants struggled from start to finish in an uphill battle as Daniel Jones and the offense struggled to move the ball with only 4 first downs in the first half. The defense kept the game competitive as long as they could with an early goal line stand, but were overmatched in a 26–7 blowout loss. Cardinals linebacker Haason Reddick had a dominating performance with 5 sacks and 3 forced fumbles. The Giants snapped their four-game winning streak, dropped to 5–8 on the season, and lost Jones to another leg injury. New York also dropped to second place in the NFC East when the Washington Football Team defeated the San Francisco 49ers later that afternoon to take sole possession of first place.

==== Week 15: vs. Cleveland Browns ====
Week Fifteen: Cleveland Browns at New York Giants – Game summary

Quarter	1	2	3	4	Total
**Browns**	0	13	0	7	**20**
Giants	3	0	0	3	**6**

at MetLife Stadium, East Rutherford, New Jersey

- Date: December 20
- Game time: 8:20 p.m. EST
- Game weather: Overcast, 36 °F (2 °C)
- Game attendance: 0
- Referee: Shawn Hochuli
- TV announcers (NBC): Mike Tirico, Cris Collinsworth, Michele Tafoya and Terry McAulay
- Recap, Game Book

Game information

**First quarter**

- NYG – Graham Gano 37-yard field goal, 4:12. Giants 3–0. **Drive: 7 plays, 38 yards, 2:53.**

**Second quarter**

- CLE – Austin Hooper 2-yard pass from Baker Mayfield (Cody Parkey kick), 12:31. Browns 7–3. **Drive: 13 plays, 75 yards, 6:41.**
- CLE – Jarvis Landry 2-yard pass from Baker Mayfield (kick failed), 0:21. Browns 13–3. **Drive: 10 plays, 95 yards, 4:55.**

**Third quarter**

- No scoring plays

**Fourth quarter**

- CLE – Nick Chubb 1-yard run (Cody Parkey kick), 12:53. Browns 20–3. **Drive: 14 plays, 95 yards, 8:04.**
- NYG – Graham Gano 39-yard field goal, 4:07. Browns 20–6. **Drive: 9 plays, 56 yards, 2:18.**

**Top passers**

- CLE – Baker Mayfield – 27/32, 297 yards, 2 TD
- NYG – Colt McCoy – 19/31, 221 yards

**Top rushers**

- CLE – Nick Chubb – 15 rushes, 50 yards, TD
- NYG – Alfred Morris – 7 rushes, 39 yards

**Top receivers**

- CLE – Rashard Higgins – 4 receptions, 76 yards
- NYG – Darius Slayton – 2 receptions, 56 yards

Before Week 14, the NFL flexed the Giants-Browns game into the Sunday Night Football slot, replacing the San Francisco 49ers visiting the Dallas Cowboys. It was the first time the Giants have played on Sunday Night since the 2018 season.

The Giants did not have Daniel Jones due to his injury and also lost offensive coordinator Jason Garrett and defensive back James Bradberry who both contracted COVID-19. Former Browns draft pick Colt McCoy and former head coach Freddie Kitchens were promoted to starting quarterback and offensive coordinator, respectively. The Giants opened the game with great field position and drove into the red zone only to turn the ball over on downs on a fake field goal attempt. The defense forced a turnover on downs of their own and the Giants took advantage of the ensuing field position and led 3–0 after the first quarter. Baker Mayfield then got hot, leading the Browns on three 10+ play touchdown drives, two of them for 95 yards. The Giants offense struggled to gain that kind of momentum and the Browns won 20–6, dropping New York to 5–9 and losing to the Browns for the first time since 2008.

==== Week 16: at Baltimore Ravens ====
Week Sixteen: New York Giants at Baltimore Ravens – Game summary

Quarter	1	2	3	4	Total
Giants	0	3	3	7	**13**
**Ravens**	14	6	0	7	**27**

at M&T Bank Stadium, Baltimore, Maryland

- Date: December 27
- Game time: 1:00 p.m. EST
- Game weather: Sunny, 38 °F (3 °C)
- Game attendance: 0
- Referee: John Hussey
- TV announcers (Fox): Kevin Kugler, Brock Huard and Laura Okmin
- Recap, Game Book

Game information

**First quarter**

- BAL – Marquise Brown 6-yard pass from Lamar Jackson (Justin Tucker kick), 6:48. Ravens 7–0. **Drive: 13 play, 82 yards, 8:12.**
- BAL – J. K. Dobbins 2-yard run (Justin Tucker kick), 0:07. Ravens 14–0. **Drive: 10 plays, 65 yards, 5:05.**

**Second quarter**

- BAL – Justin Tucker 20-yard field goal, 4:38. Ravens 17–0 . **Drive: 13 plays, 60 yards, 8:13.**
- NYG – Graham Gano 31-yard field goal, 1:08. Ravens 17–3 . **Drive: 11 plays, 64 yards, 3:30.**
- BAL – Justin Tucker 28-yard field goal, 0:00. Ravens 20–3 . **Drive: 10 plays, 65 yards, 1:08.**

**Third quarter**

- NYG – Graham Gano 42-yard field goal, 3:54. Ravens 20–6 . **Drive: 13 plays, 66 yards, 6:52.**

**Fourth quarter**

- BAL – Dez Bryant 8-yard pass from Lamar Jackson (Justin Tucker kick), 14:55. Ravens 27–6. **Drive: 7 play, 59 yards, 3:59.**
- BAL – Sterling Shepard 3-yard pass from Daniel Jones (Graham Gano kick), 8:40. Ravens 27–13. **Drive: 15 play, 76 yards, 6:15.**

**Top passers**

- NYG – Daniel Jones – 24/41, 252 yards, TD
- BAL – Lamar Jackson – 17/26, 183 yards, 2 TD

**Top rushers**

- NYG – Wayne Gallman – 6 rushes, 27 yards
- BAL – Gus Edwards – 15 rushes, 85 yards

**Top receivers**

- NYG – Sterling Shepard – 9 receptions, 77 yards, TD
- BAL – Mark Andrews – 6 receptions, 76 yards

The Ravens scored on all 4 drives in the first half and all of them were 10+ plays. Daniel Jones made his third start in 5 weeks and could only muster 89 yards on 8 completions in the first half. A tired Giants defense couldn't keep up, and the Ravens became the first team since 2008 to have 3 players run for 75+ yards in the same game (Jackson, Dobbins, and Edwards).

In the loss, kicker Graham Gano tied a Giants franchise record with his 29th consecutive field goal.

Despite the loss, the Giants remained in playoff contention with Washington's loss to the Panthers, and the Eagles loss to the Cowboys.

==== Week 17: vs. Dallas Cowboys ====
Week Seventeen: Dallas Cowboys at New York Giants – Game summary

Quarter	1	2	3	4	Total
Cowboys	3	6	7	3	**19**
**Giants**	6	14	0	3	**23**

at MetLife Stadium, East Rutherford, New Jersey

- Date: January 3, 2021
- Game time: 1:00 p.m. EST
- Game weather: Overcast, 33 °F (1 °C)
- Game attendance: 0
- Referee: Brad Allen
- TV announcers (Fox): Joe Buck, Troy Aikman and Erin Andrews
- Recap, Game Book

Game information

**First quarter**

- NYG – Sterling Shepard 23-yard run (kick failed, wl), 11:46. Giants 6–0. **Drive: 6 plays, 78 yards, 3:14.**
- DAL – Greg Zuerlein 38-yard field goal, 5:03. Giants 6–3. **Drive: 6 plays, 7 yards, 2:07.**

**Second quarter**

- NYG – Sterling Shepard 10-yard pass from Daniel Jones (Graham Gano kick), 6:42. Giants 13–3. **Drive: 6 plays, 65 yards, 3:06.**
- DAL – Greg Zuerlein 46-yard field goal, 2:13. Giants 13–6. **Drive: 10 plays, 44 yards, 4:29.**
- NYG – Dante Pettis 33-yard pass from Daniel Jones (Graham Gano kick), 0:45. Giants 20–6. **Drive: 4 plays, 75 yards, 1:28.**
- DAL – Greg Zuerlein 57-yard field goal, 0:00. Giants 20–9. **Drive: 6 plays, 35 yards, 0:45.**

**Third quarter**

- DAL – Ezekiel Elliott 1-yard run (Greg Zuerlein kick), 8:39. Giants 20–16. **Drive: 10 plays, 62 yards, 4:34.**

**Fourth quarter**

- DAL – Greg Zuerlein 36-yard field goal, 14:16. Giants 20–19. **Drive: 13 plays, 62 yards, 5:14.**
- NYG – Graham Gano 50-yard field goal, 6:27. Giants 23–19. **Drive: 8 plays, 48 yards, 4:10.**

**Top passers**

- DAL – Andy Dalton – 29/47, 243 yards, INT
- NYG – Daniel Jones – 17/25, 229 yards, 2 TD

**Top rushers**

- DAL – Andy Dalton – 7 rushes, 48 yards
- NYG – Wayne Gallman – 11 rushes, 65 yards

**Top receivers**

- DAL – Dalton Schultz – 7 receptions, 70 yards
- NYG – Sterling Shepard – 8 receptions, 112 yards, TD

Despite orchestrating just 3 touchdown drives in his previous 3 starts, Daniel Jones and the Giants came out firing, scoring 3 touchdowns in the first half, including two from Sterling Shepard, one of which was a 23-yard end-around on the opening drive. However, the Cowboys scored a field goal on their last possession in the first half and a touchdown by Ezekiel Elliott on their first drive of the third quarter to make it a one-score game.

Kickers Greg Zuerlein and Graham Gano traded field goals in the 4th quarter. Controversially, on the Giants field goal drive, Cowboys head coach Mike McCarthy failed to challenge an 11-yard catch by Dante Pettis on 3rd and 16 to put the Giants in field goal range, despite replays showing the ball had touched the ground. On the Cowboys' last chance of the game, needing a touchdown to win, Leonard Williams sacked Andy Dalton on first and goal and got to him again. On third down, Williams hit Dalton as he was throwing the ball, and the pass was intercepted by rookie safety Xavier McKinney, his first NFL interception. Needing a first down to run out the clock, running back Wayne Gallman got it, then dropped the football without being touched. Fortunately, he recovered his own fumble in the mad dash and the Giants then ran out the clock.

With the win, the Giants improved to 6–10 and eliminated the Cowboys. They also snapped a 7-game losing streak against them, which dated back to Week 14 of the 2016 season. Their 6 wins was the most in a season since 2016 as well. They also won all three home games against their divisional opponents in a season for the first time since 2005. However, the Giants were eliminated when the Washington Football Team defeated the Philadelphia Eagles 20-14 and clinched the NFC East later that night. The Giants would not defeat the Cowboys again until Week 18 of the 2025 season.

=== Standings ===
==== Division ====
NFC East
	W	L	T	PCT	DIV	CONF	PF	PA	STK
^{(4)} Washington Football Team	7	9	0	.438	4–2	5–7	335	329	W1
New York Giants	6	10	0	.375	4–2	5–7	280	357	W1
Dallas Cowboys	6	10	0	.375	2–4	5–7	395	473	L1
Philadelphia Eagles	4	11	1	.281	2–4	4–8	334	418	L3

==== Conference ====
NFC
#	Team	Division	W	L	T	PCT	DIV	CONF	SOS	SOV	STK
**Division leaders**
1	Green Bay Packers	North	13	3	0	.813	5–1	10–2	.428	.387	W6
2 (Note: New Orleans finished ahead of Seattle based on conference record.)	New Orleans Saints	South	12	4	0	.750	6–0	10–2	.459	.406	W2
3	Seattle Seahawks	West	12	4	0	.750	4–2	9–3	.447	.404	W4
4	Washington Football Team	East	7	9	0	.438	4–2	5–7	.459	.388	W1
**Wild cards**
5	Tampa Bay Buccaneers	South	11	5	0	.688	4–2	8–4	.488	.392	W4
6	Los Angeles Rams	West	10	6	0	.625	3–3	9–3	.494	.484	W1
7 (Note: Chicago finished and clinched the 7th and final playoff spot ahead of Arizona based on better win percentage in common games (against Detroit, the NY Giants, Carolina, and the LA Rams, Chicago finished 3–2, while Arizona finished 1–4).)	Chicago Bears	North	8	8	0	.500	2–4	6–6	.488	.336	L1
**Did not qualify for the postseason**
8	Arizona Cardinals	West	8	8	0	.500	2–4	6–6	.475	.441	L2
9	Minnesota Vikings	North	7	9	0	.438	4–2	5–7	.504	.366	W1
10 (Note: San Francisco finished ahead of the NY Giants based on head-to-head victory. Division tie break was initially used to eliminate Dallas (see below).)	San Francisco 49ers	West	6	10	0	.375	3–3	4–8	.549	.448	L1
11 (Note: NY Giants won tiebreaker over Dallas based on division record.)	New York Giants	East	6	10	0	.375	4–2	5–7	.502	.427	W1
12	Dallas Cowboys	East	6	10	0	.375	2–4	5–7	.471	.333	L1
13 (Note: Carolina finished ahead of Detroit based on head-to-head victory.)	Carolina Panthers	South	5	11	0	.313	1–5	4–8	.531	.388	L1
14	Detroit Lions	North	5	11	0	.313	1–5	4–8	.508	.350	L4
15	Philadelphia Eagles	East	4	11	1	.281	2–4	4–8	.537	.469	L3
16	Atlanta Falcons	South	4	12	0	.250	1–5	2–10	.551	.391	L5
**Tiebreakers** (Note: When breaking ties for three or more teams under the NFL's rules, they are first broken within divisions, then comparing only the highest-ranked remaining team from each division.)

== Regular season statistical leaders ==
	Player(s)	Value	NFL Rank	NFC Rank
Passing yards	Daniel Jones	2,943 Yards	19th	10th
Passing touchdowns	Daniel Jones	11 TDs	T-29th	15th
Rushing yards	Wayne Gallman	682 Yards	26th	11th
Rushing touchdowns	Wayne Gallman	6 TDs	T-25th	T-14th
Receptions	Sterling Shepard	66 Receptions	T-36th	T-23rd
Receiving yards	Darius Slayton	751 Yards	46th	24th
Receiving touchdowns	Sterling Shepard & Darius Slayton	3 TDs	T-87th	T-45th
Points	Graham Gano	114 Points	16th	9th
Kickoff Return Yards	Dion Lewis	538 Yards	11th	6th
Punt return Yards	Jabrill Peppers	187 Yards	12th	2nd
Tackles	Blake Martinez	151 Tackles	3rd	2nd
Sacks	Leonard Williams	11.5 Sacks	7th	5th
Interceptions	James Bradberry	3 INTs	T-16th	T-7th
