= Daryl Worley =

American football player (born 1995)

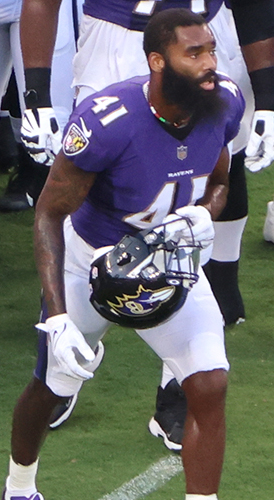
- Worley with the Baltimore Ravens in 2022

Profile
- Position: Safety

Personal information
- Born: February 22, 1995 (age 31); Philadelphia, Pennsylvania, U.S.
- Listed height: 6 ft 1 in (1.85 m)
- Listed weight: 205 lb (93 kg)

Career information
- High school: William Penn Charter (Philadelphia)
- College: West Virginia (2013–2015)
- NFL draft: 2016: 3rd round, 77th overall pick

Career history
- Carolina Panthers (2016–2017); Philadelphia Eagles (2018)*; Oakland Raiders (2018–2019); Dallas Cowboys (2020); Buffalo Bills (2020); Las Vegas Raiders (2020); Arizona Cardinals (2021)*; Detroit Lions (2021); Baltimore Ravens (2021–2023); Tennessee Titans (2024); Washington Commanders (2025)*
- * Offseason or practice squad member only

Awards and highlights
- Second-team All-Big 12 (2015)

Career NFL statistics as of 2025
- Total tackles: 344
- Sacks: 2
- Forced fumbles: 1
- Fumble recoveries: 1
- Interceptions: 6
- Pass deflections: 42
- Stats at Pro Football Reference

Daryl Worley (born February 22, 1995) is an American professional football safety. He played college football for the West Virginia Mountaineers and was selected by the Carolina Panthers in the third round of the 2016 NFL draft. Worley has also been a member of several other NFL teams.

== Early life ==
Worley attended the William Penn Charter School and was a standout receiver and safety for head coach Jeff Humble. As a receiver, he earned first-team honors during his junior and senior seasons.

As a defensive back, he earned first-team honors as a senior. He was an All-Southeastern Pennsylvania First-team defensive back and 2-time Penn Inter-Ac League First-team football player. He was rated as Southeastern Pennsylvania's top cornerback by the Philadelphia Inquirer coming out of high school.

College recruiting
Name	Hometown	School	Height	Weight	40^{‡}	Commit date
Daryl Worley; S	Philadelphia, Pennsylvania	William Penn Charter School	6 ft 0 in (1.83 m)	185 lb (84 kg)	4.48	Jul 31, 2012
Daryl Worley; S	Recruit ratings: Scout: Rivals: 247Sports: (77)					
Overall recruit ranking: Scout: 33 (S) Rivals: 51 (Safety) 247Sports: 60 (Safety) ESPN: 97 (S)
Note: In many cases, Scout, Rivals, 247Sports, On3, and ESPN may conflict in their listings of height and weight.; In these cases, the average was taken. ESPN grades are on a 100-point scale.; Sources: "West Virginia Football Commitments". Rivals.; "2013 West Virginia Football Commits". Scout.; "ESPN". ESPN.; "Scout.com Team Recruiting Rankings". Scout.; "2013 Team Ranking". Rivals.com.

== College career ==
Worley attended West Virginia University where he played for the Mountaineers from 2013 to 2015. As a true freshman, he played in 11 games and started 5 games. He was primarily used on special teams and finished the season with 45 tackles (36 solo and 3 tackles-for-loss) and 1 interception. He was also second on the team with five pass breakups.

As a sophomore, he started in all 11 games for the Mountaineers. He led the team with 3 interceptions. He was also the fifth-leading tackler on the team with 52 tackles (44 solo and 4.5 tackles-for-loss) and also recorded 4 pass breakups. He was named the Iron Mountaineer honoree for excellence in the weight room. His three interceptions tied him for 11th in the Big 12 Conference.

As a junior, Worley earned 1st Team All-Big 12 honors after finishing among the nation's leaders with 6 interceptions and 12 pass breakups. He also recorded 49 tackles (46 solo and 2 tackles-for-loss) and forced 2 fumbles on the year. Despite a recommendation from the NFL Draft Advisory Committee to return to school, Worley decided to forgo his final season of eligibility and enter the 2016 NFL draft.

== Professional career ==
Pre-draft measurables
Height	Weight	Arm length	Hand span	40-yard dash	10-yard split	20-yard split	20-yard shuttle	Three-cone drill	Vertical jump	Broad jump	Bench press
6 ft 0 3/4 in (1.85 m)	204 lb (93 kg)	33 3/8 in (0.85 m)	10 1/4 in (0.26 m)	4.58 s	1.58 s	2.65 s	4.15 s	6.98 s	35.5 in (0.90 m)	10 ft 3 in (3.12 m)	14 reps
All values from NFL Combine/Pro Day

=== Carolina Panthers ===
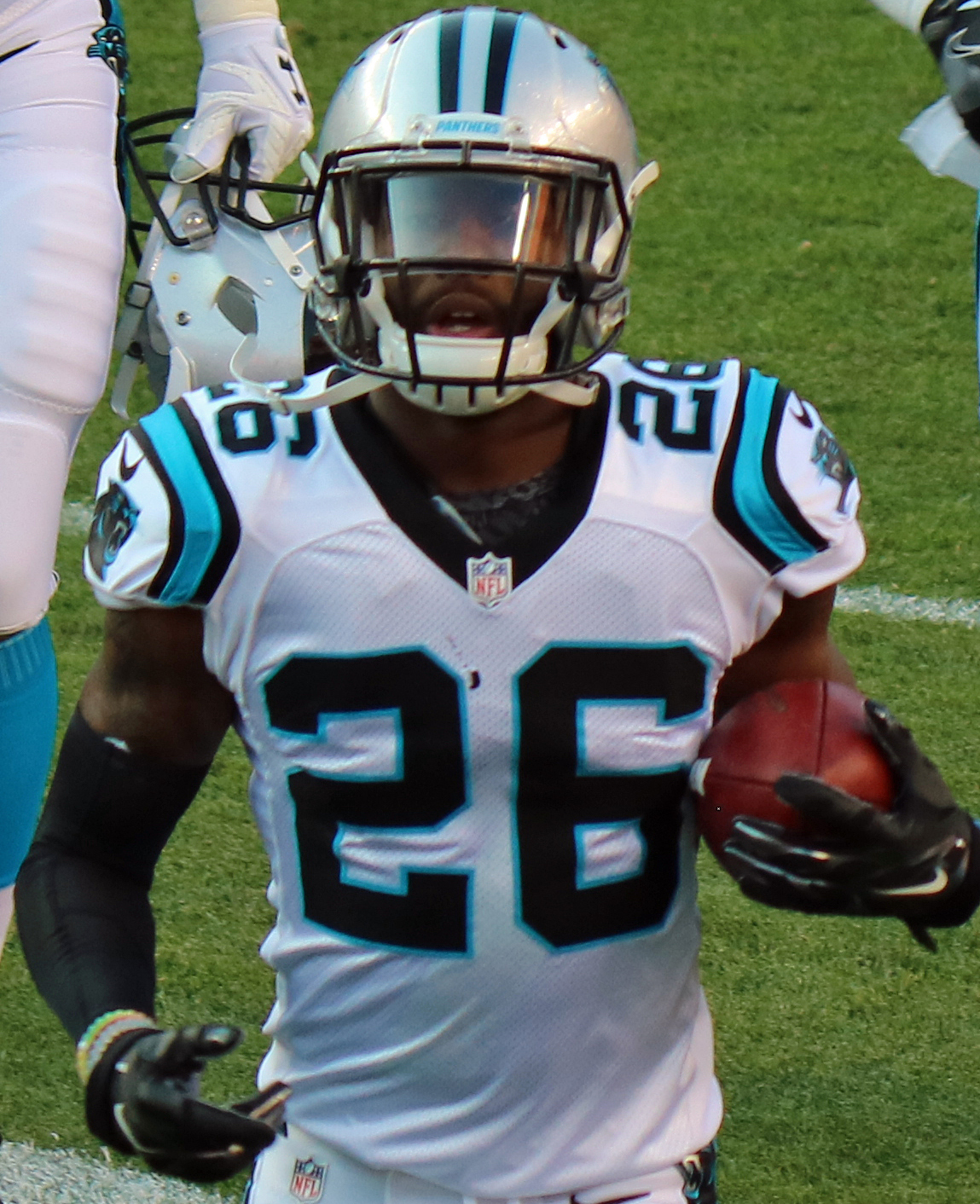
Worley with the Carolina Panthers in 2016

Worley was selected by the Carolina Panthers in the third round (77th overall) of the 2016 NFL draft. On May 10, 2016, the Panthers signed Worley to a four-year, $3.23 million contract that included a signing bonus of $783,684.

He opened the 2016 NFL season as third on the cornerback depth chart, behind veteran Bené Benwikere and fellow rookie James Bradberry. After Julio Jones had 300 receiving yards over the Panthers in Week 4 of the NFL season, primarily against Benwikere and Worley, Benwikere was released. This made Bradberry the number one starting cornerback, Worley the number two, and fellow rookie Zack Sanchez the number three. Worley steadily improved throughout the year and finished the season ranked as the twelfth best cornerback against the run by respected analytical site Pro Football Focus.

In 2017, he appeared in 15 games with 14 starts at right cornerback. He was declared inactive in the fourth game against the New England Patriots. He collected 64 tackles (4 for loss), 2 interceptions, 10 passes defensed, one sack and one quarterback hit.

=== Philadelphia Eagles ===
On March 9, 2018, the Panthers agreed to trade Worley to the Philadelphia Eagles in exchange for wide receiver Torrey Smith. The deal became official on March 14. On April 15, the Philadelphia Police Department arrested Worley for driving under the influence, disorderly conduct, and violation of the uniform firearms act. Worley was found by police passed out in his vehicle while blocking a highway that was near a team facility. It was reported the arrest was at 6AM and police were required to use a taser on Worley after he became combative. The next day, the Eagles officially released Worley due to his arrest.

=== Oakland Raiders ===
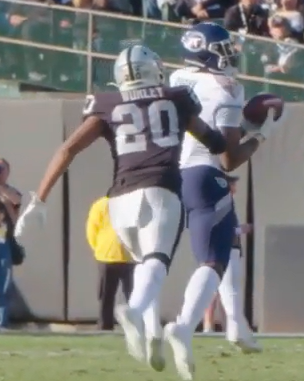
Worley with the Oakland Raiders in 2019

On April 23, 2018, the Oakland Raiders signed Worley to a one-year, $630,000 contract at the league minimum. He was suspended the first four games of for violating the NFL Policy and Program for Substances of Abuse and the Personal Conduct Policy. In Week 6 against the Seattle Seahawks, Worley made five tackles and intercepted quarterback Russell Wilson. He was placed on injured reserve on December 24. Worley finished the season playing in 10 games with nine starts, recording 33 tackles, seven passes defended, and one interception.

On March 7, 2019, the Raiders placed a second-round restricted free agent tender on Worley. In Week 9 against the Detroit Lions, Worley recorded a one-handed interception off Matthew Stafford, that was intended for wide receiver Kenny Golladay in the end zone during the 31–24 win. In Week 15, he missed the team's game against the Jacksonville Jaguars with a neck injury. Worley started 15 games at left cornerback, totaling 58 tackles, one interception, 8 passes defended, and one fumble recovery. He also played defensive snaps at safety and slot cornerback.

=== Dallas Cowboys ===
On April 29, 2020, the Dallas Cowboys signed Worley to a one-year, $3 million contract that includes a signing bonus of $1 million. Throughout training camp, Worley competed to be the starting right cornerback against Anthony Brown and rookie Trevon Diggs. He was also used at the safety position. In the team's third game against the Seattle Seahawks, the Cowboys were forced to start him at left cornerback opposite Diggs, after Chidobe Awuzie was placed on the injured reserve with a hamstring injury, joining Brown who was already on injured reserve with a rib injury. He struggled in four straight starts and was often targeted in coverage by the opposing teams. In the team's sixth game against the Arizona Cardinals, Worley was benched after giving up an 80-yard touchdown reception to wide receiver Christian Kirk, while being in zone coverage. His defensive snaps were limited the rest of the way, until being released on October 28, as part of a roster purge that included free agency acquisitions Dontari Poe and Everson Griffen. He posted 13 tackles and one pass defended in seven appearances (including four starts).

=== Buffalo Bills ===
On November 3, 2020, Worley was signed to the practice squad of the Buffalo Bills. He was elevated to the active roster on November 14, for the team's Week 10 game against the Arizona Cardinals, and reverted to the practice squad after the game.

=== Las Vegas Raiders ===
On December 9, 2020, Worley was signed by the Las Vegas Raiders off the Bills' practice squad, to provide depth with injuries suffered by Damon Arnette, Lamarcus Joyner, and Johnathan Abram. He was placed on the reserve/COVID-19 list by the team on December 18. and activated on December 30. Worley appeared in two games for Las Vegas, starting one, recording eight tackles and two passes defended. He wasn't re-signed after the season.

=== Arizona Cardinals ===
On July 26, 2021, Worley signed with the Arizona Cardinals. He was released by the Cardinals on August 31.

=== Detroit Lions ===
On September 15, 2021, Worley was signed to the Detroit Lions' practice squad. He was promoted to the active roster on September 22. Worley was released on October 26, and re-signed to the team's practice squad. He was released on November 4.

=== Baltimore Ravens ===
On December 21, 2021, Worley was signed to the Baltimore Ravens' practice squad. He was brought back by the Ravens on August 8, 2022. Worley was released by Baltimore on August 30, and re-signed to the practice squad the following day. He was promoted to the active roster on September 17. Worley was waived on September 27, and later re-signed to the practice squad. He was promoted back to the active roster on October 8, then released again three days later and re-signed to the practice squad. Worley was promoted back to the active roster on October 22. He was placed on injured reserve on December 10 before being activated again on January 7, 2023. He was named a starter at cornerback in the team's season finale against the Cincinnati Bengals, making five tackles and defending two passes, while helping to defend wide receiver Ja'Marr Chase. Worley appeared in eight games (starting one) for Baltimore during the season.

On February 15, 2023, Worley re-signed with the Ravens. He was released on August 29, and re-signed to the practice squad. Worley was elevated to the active roster on September 9. He was promoted to the active roster three days later. Worley was placed on injured reserve on October 7, and later activated on November 4.

Worley re-signed with the Ravens on July 26, 2024. He was released by Baltimore on August 27, as a part of final roster cuts.

=== Tennessee Titans ===
On November 5, 2024, Worley was signed to the Tennessee Titans practice squad, following a number of injuries to the Titans' defensive backfield. Worley had three game day elevations, including his first start with the Titans in the team's Week 12 win over the Houston Texans, substituting at safety for a sick Amani Hooker. He was then promoted to the active roster on November 29. Worley started as cornerback in Tennessee's Week 13 loss to the Washington Commanders, recording a career-high 17 tackles. Worley appeared in nine games during the 2024 season, logging 52 tackles, one forced fumble, and an interception.

=== Washington Commanders ===
Worley signed with the Washington Commanders on August 14, 2025, but was released during roster cuts on August 27. On November 5, the Commanders re-signed him to their practice squad. Worley was released by Washington on November 20.

== NFL career statistics ==
Year	Team	Games		Tackles				Interceptions						Fumbles	
Year	Team	GP	GS	Cmb	Solo	Ast	Sck	PD	Int	Yds	Avg	Lng	TD	FF	FR
2016	CAR	16	11	88	63	25	1	9	1	22	22	22	0	0	0
2017	CAR	15	14	64	50	14	1	10	2	0	0	0	0	0	0
2018	OAK	10	9	33	30	3	0	7	1	16	16	16	0	0	0
2019	OAK	15	15	58	51	7	0	8	1	0	0	0	0	0	1
2020	BUF	1	0	0	0	0	0	0	0	0	0	0	0	0	0
2020	DAL	7	4	14	12	2	0	1	0	0	0	0	0	0	0
2020	LV	2	1	8	5	3	0	2	0	0	0	0	0	0	0
2021	DET	3	0	2	0	2	0	0	0	0	0	0	0	0	0
2021	BAL	1	0	5	5	0	0	0	0	0	0	0	0	0	0
2022	BAL	8	1	8	6	2	0	2	0	0	0	0	0	0	0
2023	BAL	12	2	12	8	4	0	1	0	0	0	0	0	0	0
2024	TEN	9	7	52	28	24	0	2	1	0	0	0	0	1	0
Total		99	64	344	258	86	2	42	6	38	6.3	38	0	1	1
