= Kyle Murphy (American football, born 1998) =

American football player (born 1998)

No. 60
- Position: Offensive tackle

Personal information
- Born: May 18, 1998 (age 28); Attleboro, Massachusetts
- Listed height: 6 ft 4 in (1.93 m)
- Listed weight: 302 lb (137 kg)

Career information
- High school: Attleboro (MA)
- College: Rhode Island (2016–2019)
- NFL draft: 2020: undrafted

Career history
- New York Giants (2020–2021)

Awards and highlights
- 2× First-team All-CAA (2018, 2019); Associated Press All-American (2019)
- Stats at Pro Football Reference

Kyle Murphy (born May 18, 1998) is an American football offensive tackle. Murphy played college football at Rhode Island and was signed by the New York Giants as an undrafted free agent following the 2020 NFL draft.

== Early life ==
Murphy was born on May 18, 1998, in Attleboro, Massachusetts, and attended Attleboro High School there. He lettered in football and basketball, and was team captain in both sports as a senior. He was named the team's Lineman of the Year and earned Sun Chronicle All-Star honors.

== College career ==
Murphy committed to University of Rhode Island, and as a true freshman in 2016 appeared in ten games. He made three starts at left guard and also was a special teams performer. He made his debut against Kansas on September 3. Against Elon on November 12, Murphy started and helped block Rhode Island to a season-high 226 rushing yards.

As a sophomore in 2017, Murphy was a starter in all 11 games, five at right tackle and six at left guard. He also played center several times due to injuries to Dwayne Scott. Murphy blocked for quarterback JaJuan Lawson, who completed .597 percent of his passes, a mark which was the fourth-best for a single year in team history. He also helped the team to 101.2 rushing yards per-game.

In 2018, as a junior, Murphy started every game, ten at left tackle and one at center, earning first-team all-conference honors and New England Football Writer's Association All-New England honors. He helped them average 121.6 rushing yards per game.

In 2019, his senior season, Murphy was named team captain and was the starting left tackle in 11 games. With his help, Rhode Island allowed only 2.17 sacks per game, despite leading the conference in pass attempts per game with 42. After blocking for 3,500 passing yards and 1,000 rushing, Murphy was named first-team All-Colonial Athletic Association and second-team All-America by Associated Press. After the season ended, he was invited to the 2020 NFLPA Collegiate Bowl.

== Professional career ==
Pre-draft measurables
| Height | Weight | Arm length | Hand span | 40-yard dash | Three-cone drill | Vertical jump | Broad jump | Bench press |
|---|---|---|---|---|---|---|---|---|
| 6 ft 4 in (1.93 m) | 302 lb (137 kg) | 33.88 inches | 10 inches | 5.30 s | 7.81 s | 28 inches | 0 ft 104 in (2.64 m) | 19 reps |
All values from NFL Combine Results

Murphy was one of three Rhode Island players invited to attend the 2020 NFL Combine. After going unselected in the 2020 NFL draft, he was signed by the New York Giants as an undrafted free agent. He was waived at roster cuts and re-signed to the practice squad the next day. Murphy was signed off the practice squad to the active roster on November 13, but was inactive for each game. He was placed on injured reserve to start the 2021 season. His contract was not tendered in 2022, making him a free agent.
