= Joe Judge (American football) =

American football coach (born 1981)

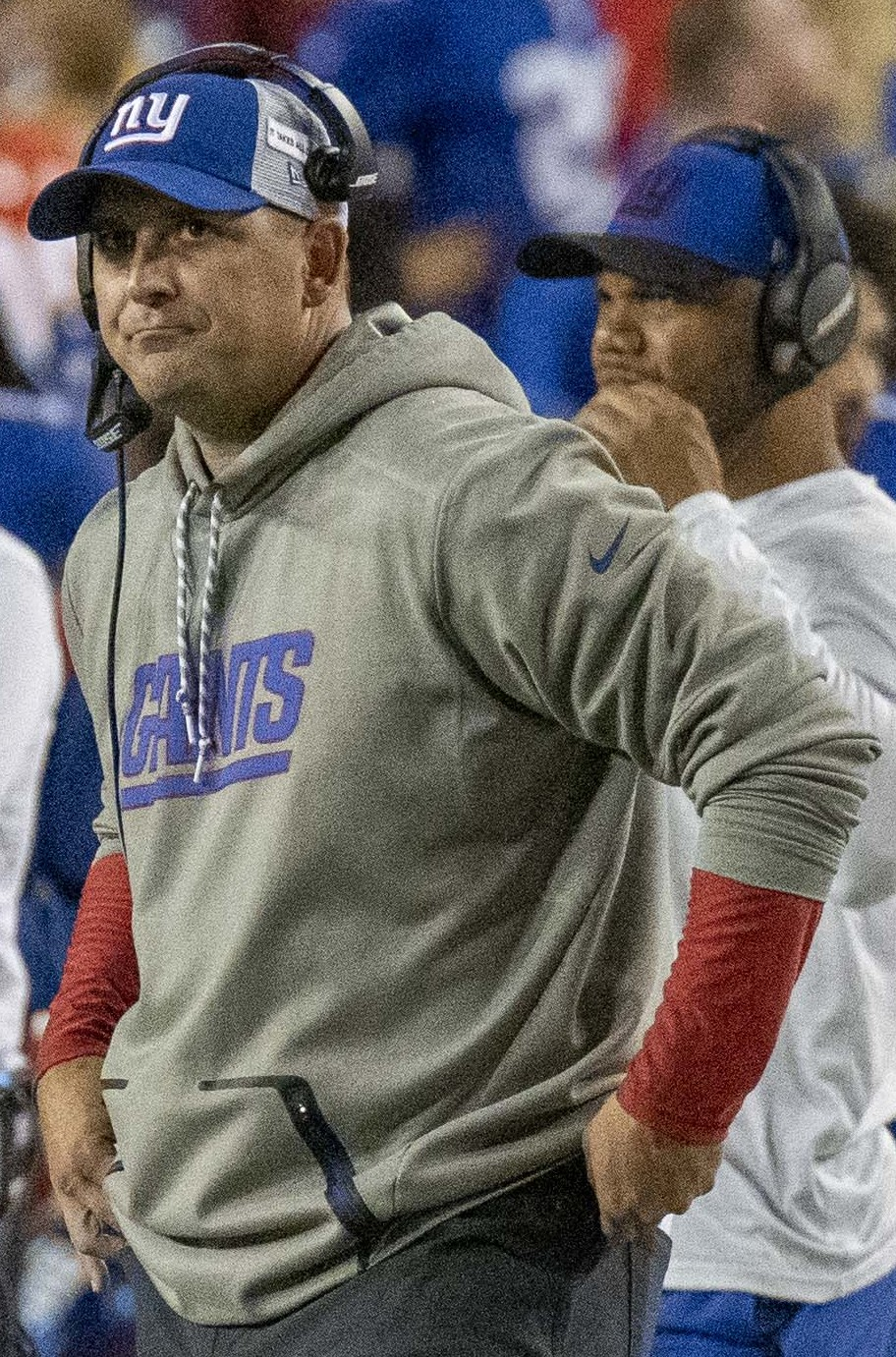
- Judge with the New York Giants in 2021

Ole Miss Rebels
- Title: Quarterbacks coach

Personal information
- Born: December 31, 1981 (age 44); Philadelphia, Pennsylvania, U.S.

Career information
- High school: Lansdale Catholic (Lansdale, Pennsylvania)
- College: Mississippi State (2000–2004)

Career history
- Mississippi State (2005–2007) Graduate assistant; Birmingham–Southern (2008) Linebackers coach & special teams coordinator; Alabama (2009–2011) Special teams assistant; New England Patriots (2012–2019); Special teams assistant (2012–2014); Special teams coordinator (2015–2018); Special teams coordinator & wide receivers coach (2019); New York Giants (2020–2021) Head coach; New England Patriots (2022–2023); Offensive assistant & quarterbacks coach (2022); Assistant head coach (2023); Ole Miss (2024–present); Senior analyst (2024); Quarterbacks coach (2025); Head coach of offense & quarterbacks coach (2026–present)

Awards and highlights
- As an assistant coach: 3× Super Bowl champion (XLIX, LI, LIII); 2× BCS national champion (2009, 2011)

Head coaching record
- Regular season: 10–23 (.303)
- Coaching profile at Pro Football Reference

Joseph Francis Judge (born December 31, 1981) is an American college and professional football coach who is currently the quarterbacks coach for Ole Miss. He was the head coach of the New York Giants from 2020 to 2021. Prior to joining the Giants, Judge served as an assistant coach for the Patriots from 2012 to 2019. The Patriots appeared in four Super Bowls, winning three of them, during Judge's tenure.

== Early life ==
Judge was born in Philadelphia, Pennsylvania. Growing up in Doylestown, Pennsylvania, he graduated from Lansdale Catholic High School in Lansdale, Pennsylvania. Judge played for Mississippi State from 2000 to 2004, earning three letters. He was also named to the SEC Academic Honor Roll and made the Dean's List. While he was a backup quarterback for Mississippi State, he primarily played on special teams as a holder and punt protector.

== Coaching career ==
=== Assistant coach ===
In 2005, he stayed on at his alma mater, Mississippi State University, as a graduate assistant for the Bulldogs. He next served briefly as the linebackers coach for the Birmingham–Southern Panthers in 2008 and then as a special teams assistant for Alabama. In 2012, he joined the New England Patriots as a special teams assistant and served in that role through the 2014 season. Following the Patriots' victory over the Seattle Seahawks in Super Bowl XLIX, Judge was promoted to special teams coordinator following the retirement of Scott O'Brien. On February 5, 2017, Judge was part of the Patriots' coaching staff that won Super Bowl LI. In the game, the Patriots defeated the Atlanta Falcons by a score of 34–28 in overtime.

On February 6, 2018, it was reported that Judge was leaving the Patriots to join the Indianapolis Colts' new head coach Josh McDaniels in Indianapolis; when McDaniels spurned the Colts and chose to stay with the Patriots, Judge made the same decision. After wide receivers coach Chad O'Shea left New England to become offensive coordinator for the Miami Dolphins, Judge was tapped to fill O'Shea's role while continuing to serve as special teams coordinator; according to ESPN, he was the only coach in the NFL with both special teams and wide receiver duties. Judge won his third Super Bowl title when the Patriots defeated the Los Angeles Rams in Super Bowl LIII.

=== New York Giants ===
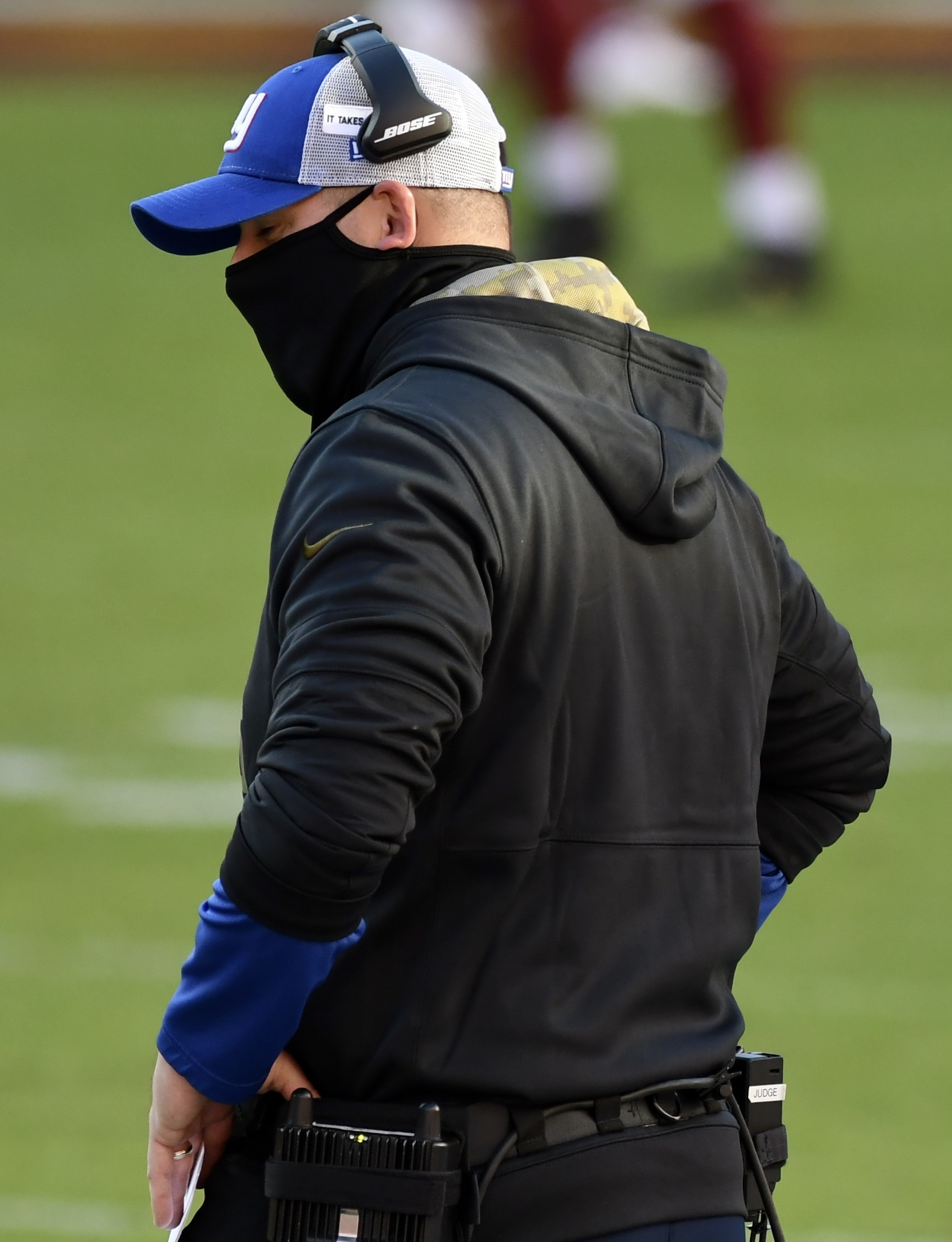
Judge with the New York Giants in 2020

On January 8, 2020, Judge was hired to become the 21st head coach of the New York Giants and paired with incumbent general manager Dave Gettleman, who had posted a 9-23 record (.281) with fired coach Pat Shurmur. According to Sports Illustrated's Rick Gosselin, Judge is only the second NFL head coach to have been hired directly from a special teams coaching job, after Frank Gansz.

==== 2020 season ====
At age 39 as a rookie head coach in 2020, Judge inherited a rebuilding Giants roster and navigated the team through a pandemic, the ripples of social unrest and a Week 2 season ending injury to star running back Saquon Barkley to post a 6-10 record and finish just shy of a playoff berth. After the Giants defeated the rival Cowboys in week 17, they needed an Eagles loss to Washington to give them the NFC East championship. However, Washington beat the Eagles, 20–14, giving them the NFC East championship instead. In a press conference the next day, Judge criticized the Eagles' competitiveness after pulling starter Jalen Hurts for backup Nate Sudfeld in the fourth quarter, despite it being a must-win game for the NFC East. He called the Eagles' effort "disrespecting the game" and stated that "we will never do that as long as I'm the head coach for the New York Giants".

The Giants’ six wins, 3-5 home record, 4-2 NFC East record and second place division finish all were the franchise’s best marks since 2016. The Giants won four straight games for the first time since 2016 in Judge's first season, beating Washington, Philadelphia, Cincinnati and Seattle consecutively from Nov. 8-Dec. 6, including three out of four on the road.

It was the first time since the Giants’ 2011 Super Bowl season that the team had won three straight road games in a single season.

Judge’s 2020 Giants also swept division foes Philadelphia, Dallas and Washington at home for the first time since 2005 and ended long droughts against their two top rivals. They snapped an eight-game franchise losing streak to the Eagles and a seven-game losing streak to the Cowboys that both dated back to 2016.

The Giants’ 2020 defense ranked ninth in scoring (22.3 points per game allowed) and 12th in yards (349.3), which were dramatic improvements over 2019 as the NFL’s 30th ranked scoring defense (28.1 points per game) that had finished 25th in yards allowed (377.3).

The team's five games from Oct. 11-Nov. 8 (2-3) were decided by a total of 10 points, which set a new franchise record.

Judge also landed two cornerstone players and future captains for the franchise in his first NFL Draft: left tackle Andrew Thomas at No. 4 overall in the first round and safety Xavier McKinney at No. 36 at the top of the second round.

Thomas blossomed into a second team All-Pro in 2022. McKinney made five interceptions for the Giants in 2021 and became a first-team All-Pro safety for the Green Bay Packers in 2024.

==== 2021 season ====
Despite the previous season ending with a 6-10 record, in March 2021, Eli Manning gave Judge's Giants a vote of confidence, saying they were "heading in the right direction." The Giants started the 2021 season with a 4-7 record, when quarterback Daniel Jones sustained a neck injury in Week 12. They started Mike Glennon and Jake Fromm for the remainder of the season. In the middle of the season, he fired offensive coordinator Jason Garrett after a loss on Monday Night Football to the Tampa Bay Buccaneers. He promoted Freddie Kitchens as interim offensive coordinator for the remainder of the season.

On January 2, 2022, after a 29–3 week 18 loss to the Chicago Bears in which the Giants finished with –10 passing yards and 155 yards of total offense, Judge famously went on an 11-minute rant during his postgame press conference. This came in response to a question asked about why fans should have faith that he could get the franchise turned around despite the team's recent struggles. In his rant, he called out his predecessor, Pat Shurmur, for his culture by claiming that players had quit on him, and then called out then-Washington head coach Ron Rivera, and the Washington franchise in general, by saying that his team wasn't "a team that was having fistfights on the sidelines" or "some clown-show organization". Finally, he claimed that if his team didn't perform well the next week, every fan in attendance "has a right to boo my ass out of the stadium". This rant was heavily criticized by the press and Giants fans and was ultimately seen as a domino effect for Judge's end in New York. He was fired the next week after the Giants lost to Washington 22–7. In the closing minutes of the first half, Judge called for 2 quarterback sneaks from his own 2 and 4-yard line on 2nd and 11 and 3rd and 9, resulting in Giants fans loudly booing at him. The Giants finished the season with 6 straight losses, all by double digits, and a 4–13 record. General manager Dave Gettleman also retired after the season.

Judge finished his tenure in New York with an overall record of 10–23 (.303). He went 3-5 against the Eagles and Cowboys in two seasons with the Giants. All other Giants coaches from 2017 through November 2025 have a 2-26 combined record against the Eagles and Cowboys in that same span.

Judge, his coaching staff and the Giants’ players chipped in a franchise record $300,000 to spread among 70 members of the organization’s support staff for the holiday season during his second and final year running the team.

=== New England Patriots (second stint) ===
On February 8, 2022, the Patriots announced that Judge was hired as an offensive assistant. On July 21, 2022, the Patriots announced that he would also be the quarterbacks coach. Then he was named assistant head coach in 2023.

Under Judge’s guidance in 2023, Mac Jones finished with a 65.2 completion percentage, his second straight season with a pass completion of at least 65 percent. Jones, Justin Herbert and Joe Burrow are the only players to accomplish that feat in their first two NFL seasons.

=== Ole Miss Rebels ===
In the spring of 2024, Judge joined Lane Kiffin's Ole Miss Rebels coaching staff as a senior analyst. In the fall of 2024, he worked closely with quarterback Jaxson Dart, who was named first-team All-SEC while running one of the top offenses in the country. Dart then was selected No. 25 overall by Judge's former Giants team in the first round of the 2025 NFL Draft.

In the summer of 2025, Ole Miss made a 'strong push' to retain Judge after he interviewed for the head coaching vacancies at UMass, Temple and Southern Miss. Ole Miss created a new position and promoted Judge as assistant to quarterbacks coach to keep him on Kiffin's staff.

In 2025, Judge again oversaw one of the nation's top offenses with Division II transfer Trinidad Chambliss thriving at quarterback. Austin Simmons started the season as Ole Miss' quarterback, but an ankle injury hampered and sidelined Simmons after two starts. Chambliss took over and posted an 8-1 record while starting the next nine games leading into late November 2025.

== Personal life ==
Judge's father, Joseph, played football at Temple and professionally with the Hamilton Tiger-Cats of the Canadian Football League. Judge's wife, Amber, was an All-SEC soccer player at Mississippi State, and they have four children together. Judge's son, Sean, plays college football at Ole Miss.

== Head coaching record ==
Team	Year	Regular season					Postseason			
Team	Year	Won	Lost	Ties	Win %	Finish	Won	Lost	Win %	Result
NYG	2020	6	10	0	.375	2nd in NFC East	—	—	—	—
NYG	2021	4	13	0	.235	4th in NFC East	—	—	—	—
Total		10	23	0	.303		0	0	.000	
