= Darius Slayton =

American football player (born 1997)

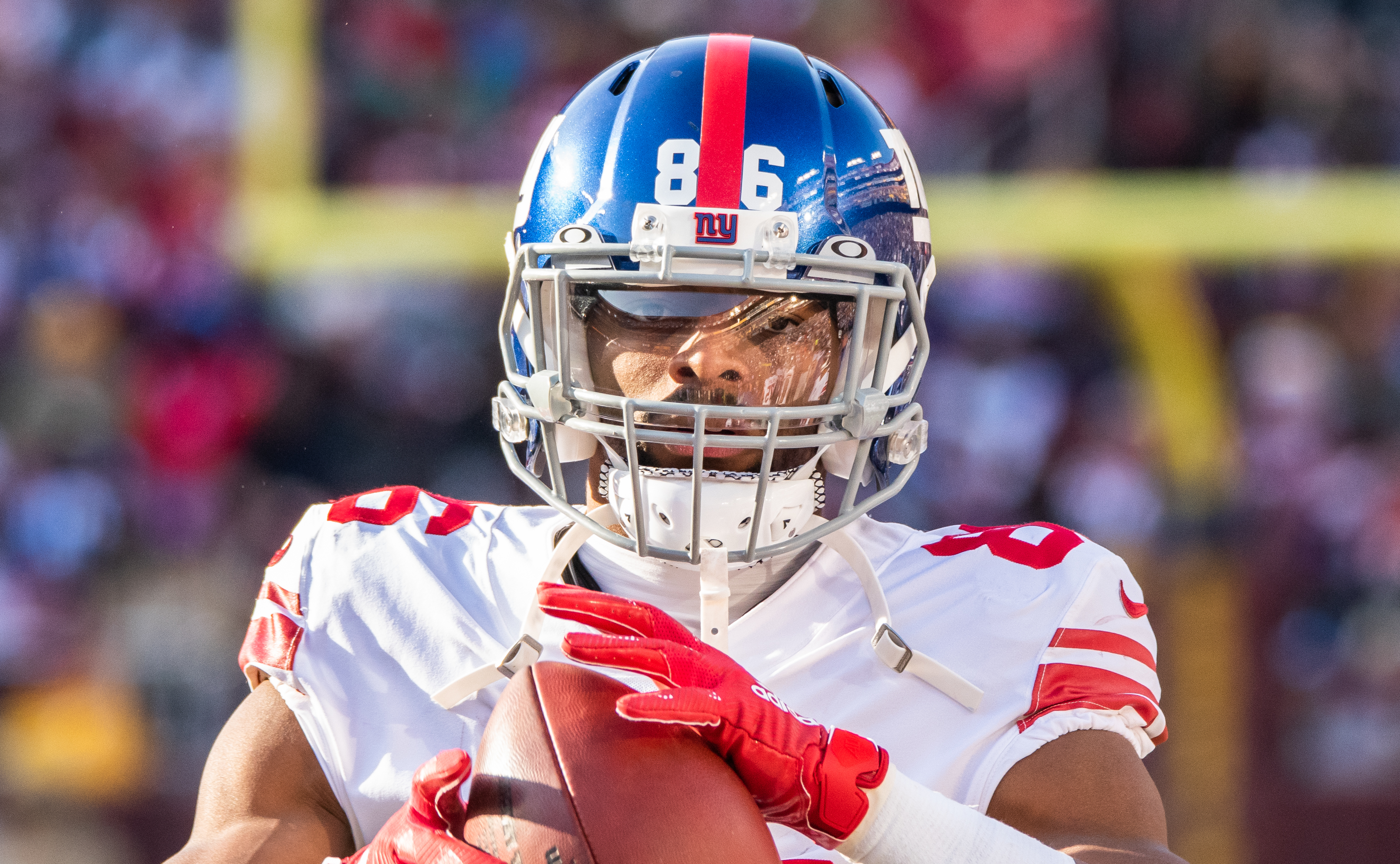
- Slayton with the New York Giants in 2019

Profile
- Position: Wide receiver

Personal information
- Born: January 12, 1997 (age 29); Norcross, Georgia, U.S.
- Listed height: 6 ft 1 in (1.85 m)
- Listed weight: 198 lb (90 kg)

Career information
- High school: Greater Atlanta Christian School (Norcross)
- College: Auburn (2015–2018)
- NFL draft: 2019: 5th round, 171st overall pick

Career history
- New York Giants (2019–2025); Indianapolis Colts (2026)

Career NFL statistics as of 2025
- Receptions: 296
- Receiving yards: 4,435
- Receiving touchdowns: 22
- Stats at Pro Football Reference

Darius Slayton (born January 12, 1997) is an American professional football wide receiver. He played college football for the Auburn Tigers and was selected by the New York Giants in the fifth round of the 2019 NFL draft. He has also played for the Indianapolis Colts.

== Early life ==
Slayton attended and played high school football at Greater Atlanta Christian School. He played primarily as a wide receiver while also seeing time at defensive back. His athleticism and speed became important parts of his development as a football player, while his experience in track and field helped him develop as a sprinter.

His background in track and field was particularly significant to his development. Slayton competed in sprinting events, giving him experience with acceleration, running technique and top-end speed. Those abilities later became some of his most recognizable characteristics as a football player. His speed allowed him to separate from defenders and become an effective deep-ball threat.

As he progressed through high school, Slayton’s football performances began attracting attention from college recruiters. Playing in Georgia, a state known for producing highly regarded football prospects, placed him in a competitive recruiting environment. His combination of size, athleticism and speed made him a promising prospect at the wide receiver position.

Slayton ultimately committed to Auburn University to continue his football career.

== College career ==
Slayton attended and played college football at Auburn University. He redshirted in 2015 and contributed on the field from 2016–18. As a senior, he caught 35 passes for 670 yards and five touchdowns.

== Professional career ==
Pre-draft measurables
Height	Weight	Arm length	Hand span	Wingspan	40-yard dash	10-yard split	20-yard split	20-yard shuttle	Three-cone drill	Vertical jump	Broad jump	Bench press
6 ft 1 in (1.85 m)	190 lb (86 kg)	32 3/4 in (0.83 m)	10 in (0.25 m)	6 ft 7 in (2.01 m)	4.39 s	1.45 s	2.62 s	4.15 s	7.00 s	40.5 in (1.03 m)	11 ft 3 in (3.43 m)	11 reps
All values from NFL Combine

=== New York Giants ===
==== 2019 ====
Slayton was drafted by the New York Giants in the fifth round, 171st overall, of the 2019 NFL draft. He was the 18th wide receiver taken that year.

In Slayton's first NFL game, a Week 3 32–31 victory over the Tampa Bay Buccaneers, he had three receptions for 82 yards from fellow 2019 NFL draft pick Daniel Jones. In his third game, a 28–10 loss to the Minnesota Vikings, he scored a 35-yard touchdown. In Week 8 against the Detroit Lions, Slayton caught two passes for 50 yards, both of which ended up being touchdowns, in the 31–26 loss. During Week 10 against the New York Jets, Slayton finished with 10 catches for 121 receiving yards and two touchdowns as the Giants lost 27–34. During Monday Night Football against the Philadelphia Eagles in Week 14, Slayton finished with five catches, all in the first half, for 154 receiving yards and two touchdowns as the Giants lost 17–23 in overtime. Overall, Slayton finished his rookie season with 48 receptions for 740 receiving yards and eight receiving touchdowns, leading the Giants in receiving yards for the 2019 season.

==== 2020 ====
In the Giants' 2020 regular season opener against the Pittsburgh Steelers on Monday Night Football, Slayton had six receptions for 102 receiving yards and two receiving touchdowns during the 26–16 loss. In Week 5 against the Dallas Cowboys, Slayton recorded eight catches for 129 yards during the 37–34 loss. He finished the 2020 season with 50 receptions for 751 receiving yards and three receiving touchdowns.

==== 2021 ====
In the Giants' Week 2 game against the Washington Football Team, Slayton finished with three receptions for 54 yards and a touchdown, but dropped a pass in the end zone in the fourth quarter. He finished the 2021 season with 26 receptions for 339 receiving yards and two receiving touchdowns in 13 games and five starts.

==== 2022 ====
In Week 10 game against the Houston Texans, Slayton averaged 31.7 yards per catch, a career-high for a single game. He also had a 54 yard touchdown and finished with three receptions for 95 yards and a touchdown in the 24–16 win. He finished the season with 46 catches for 724 yards and two touchdowns through 16 games and 11 starts.

==== 2023 ====
On March 16, 2023, Slayton signed a two-year contract extension with the Giants. Slayton finished the 2023 season with 50 receptions for 770 yards and four touchdowns.

==== 2024 ====
In Week 8 against the Pittsburgh Steelers, Slayton had four receptions for 108 yards in the 26–18 loss. In 16 games (13 starts) for the Giants, he recorded 39 receptions for 573 yards and two touchdowns.

==== 2025 ====
On March 10, 2025, Slayton re-signed with the Giants on a three-year, $36 million contract. In 14 appearances (including 12 starts) for New York, Slayton had 37 receptions for 538 yards and one touchdown.

==== 2026 ====
On April 30, 2026, Slayton underwent core-muscle surgery, with the procedure not being expected to affect his availability for training camp. On September 7, Slayton was released by the Giants.

=== Indianapolis Colts ===
On September 22, 2026, Slayton signed with the Indianapolis Colts. On October 16, he was released.

== Career statistics ==
=== NFL ===
Legend
**Bold**	Career high

==== Regular season ====
Year	Team	Games		Receiving					Rushing					Fumbles	
Year	Team	GP	GS	Rec	Yds	Avg	Lng	TD	Att	Yds	Avg	Lng	TD	Fum	Lost
2019	NYG	14	9	48	740	15.4	55	**8**	0	0	0.0	0	0	0	0
2020	NYG	16	**15**	**50**	751	15.0	41	3	**2**	−1	−0.5	2	0	1	**1**
2021	NYG	13	5	26	339	13.0	42	2	1	−13	−13.0	0	0	1	**1**
2022	NYG	16	11	46	724	**15.7**	55	2	0	0	0.0	0	0	**2**	**1**
2023	NYG	**17**	13	**50**	**770**	15.4	**80**	4	0	0	0.0	0	0	0	0
2024	NYG	16	13	39	573	14.7	43	2	**2**	**17**	**8.5**	**11**	0	0	0
2025	NYG	14	12	37	538	14.5	52	1	0	0	0.0	0	0	1	**1**
Total		106	78	296	4,435	15.0	80	22	5	3	0.6	11	0	5	4

==== Postseason ====
Year	Team	Games		Receiving					Fumbles	
Year	Team	GP	GS	Rec	Yds	Avg	Lng	TD	Fum	Lost
2022	NYG	2	2	5	92	18.4	47	0	0	0
Career		2	2	5	92	18.4	47	0	0	0

=== College ===
Season	Team	Conf	Class	Pos	GP	Receiving			
Season	Team	Conf	Class	Pos	GP	Rec	Yds	Avg	TD
2016	Auburn	SEC	FR	WR	7	15	292	19.5	1
2017	Auburn	SEC	SO	WR	11	29	643	22.2	5
2018	Auburn	SEC	JR	WR	11	35	670	19.1	5
Career					29	79	1,605	20.3	11

== Personal life ==
Slayton has been in a relationship with heptathlete Anna Hall since November 2024, and they were engaged on November 15, 2025. Hall and Slayton got married at the Oheka Castle in Long Island, New York on April 11, 2026.

Slayton’s devotion to community service has earned him the 2025 Alan Page Community Service Award. Through his Left-Hand Right-Hand (LHRH) Foundation, Slayton has personally donated more than $150,000 to support police-community relations, academic mentorship and youth programs in his hometown of Atlanta, and NYPD sponsored programs in Far Rockaway, Harlem and the Bronx.
