= 2021 New York Giants season =

97th season in franchise history

- Owner: John Mara; Steve Tisch
- General manager: Dave Gettleman
- Head coach: Joe Judge
- Home stadium: MetLife Stadium

Results
- Record: 4–13
- Division place: 4th NFC East
- Playoffs: Did not qualify

Uniform
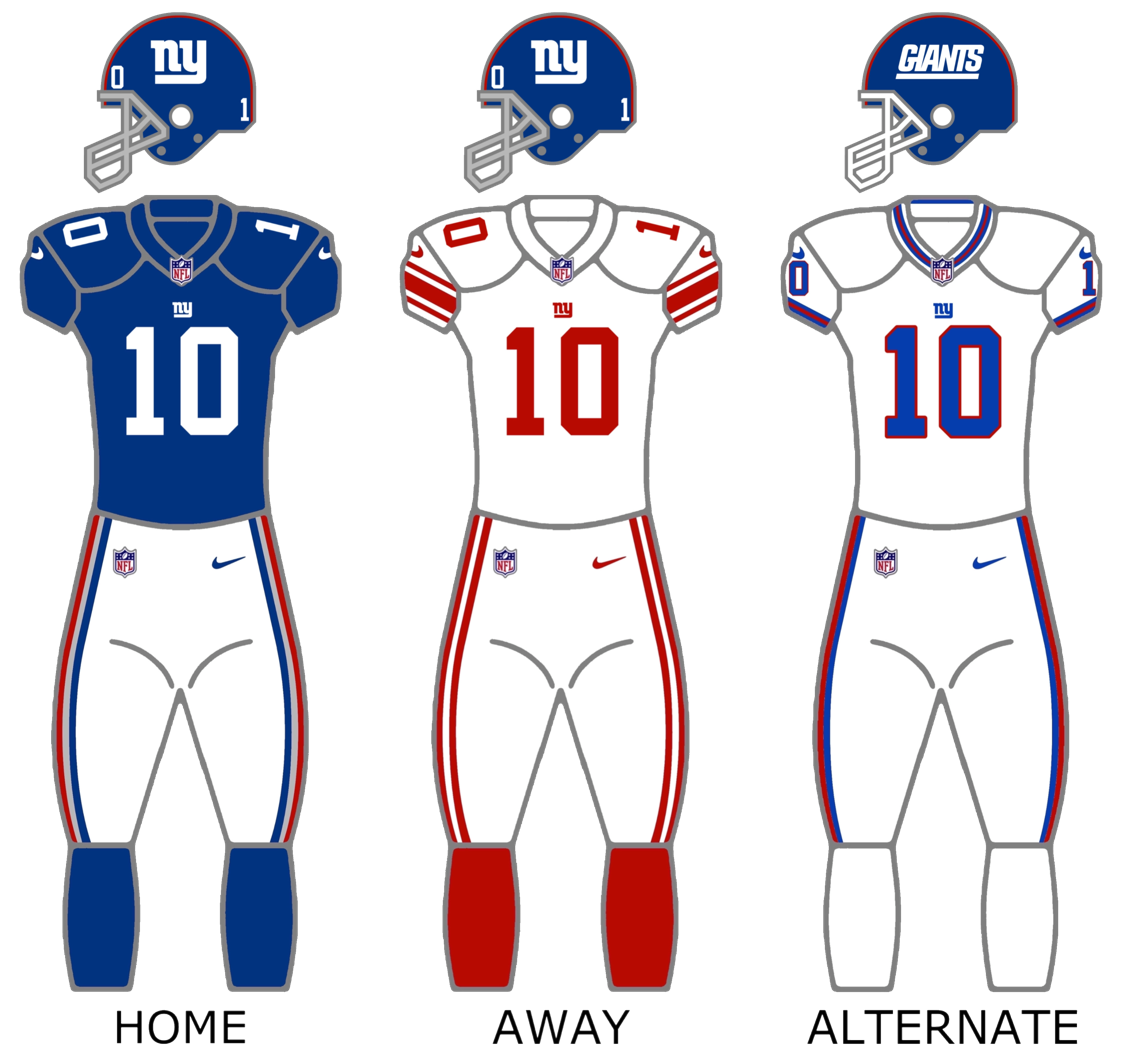

The 2021 season was the New York Giants' 97th season in the National Football League (NFL) and their second and final under head coach Joe Judge. They failed to improve on their 6–10 output from the previous season and missed the postseason for the fifth consecutive year after a Week 16 loss to the Philadelphia Eagles.

Following the season, general manager Dave Gettleman announced his retirement and head coach Joe Judge was fired.

== Offseason ==
=== Free agents ===
Position	Player	2021 Team	Date Signed	Contract
WR	C. J. Board	New York Giants	March 17, 2021	1 year, $850,000
FS	Adrian Colbert	New England Patriots	May 20, 2021	
LB	Devante Downs	New York Giants	March 19, 2021	
S	Nate Ebner			
LB	Kyler Fackrell	Los Angeles Chargers	March 24, 2021	1 year, $1.5 million
OT	Cameron Fleming	Denver Broncos	May 20, 2021	1 year, $1.67 million
RB	Wayne Gallman	San Francisco 49ers	April 21, 2021	1 year, $990,000
NT	Austin Johnson	New York Giants	March 16, 2021	1 year, $3 million
LS	Casey Kreiter	New York Giants	March 17, 2021	1 year, $1.127 million
RB	Dion Lewis	New York Giants	August 31, 2021	
LB	David Mayo	Washington Football Team	March 18, 2021	1 year, $990,000
QB	Colt McCoy	Arizona Cardinals	March 30, 2021	1 year, $1.212 million
RB	Alfred Morris	New York Giants	August 2, 2021	
C	Spencer Pulley			
LB	Jabaal Sheard			
NT	Dalvin Tomlinson	Minnesota Vikings	March 19, 2021	2 years, $22 million
DE	Leonard Williams	New York Giants	March 18, 2021	3 years, $63 million

Player re-signed by the Giants	Player not re-signed by the Giants

=== Signings ===
Position	Player	Age	2020 Team	Contract
RB	Devontae Booker	28	Oakland Raiders	2 years, $5.5 million
QB	Mike Glennon	31	Jacksonville Jaguars	1 year, $1.35 million
OLB	Ifeadi Odenigbo	26	Minnesota Vikings	1 year, $2.5 million
WR	John Ross	26	Cincinnati Bengals	1 year, $2.5 million
FB	Cullen Gillaspia	25	Houston Texans	1 year, $850,000
ILB	Reggie Ragland	27	Detroit Lions	1 year, $1.127 million
WR	Kenny Golladay	28	Detroit Lions	4 years, $72 million
CB	Adoree' Jackson	25	Tennessee Titans	3 years, $39 million
OLB	Ryan Anderson	26	Washington Football Team	1 year, $1.12 million
TE	Kyle Rudolph	31	Minnesota Vikings	2 years $12 million
G	Zach Fulton	29	Houston Texans	1 year, $1.2 million
NT	Danny Shelton	27	Detroit Lions	1 year, $1.12 million
TE	Cole Hikutini	26	Dallas Cowboys	1 year
S	Joshua Kalu	25	Tennessee Titans	1 year
CB	Christopher Milton	28	Tennessee Titans	1 year, $990,000
RB	Corey Clement	26	Philadelphia Eagles	1 year
WR	Kelvin Benjamin	30	Kansas City Chiefs (2018)	1 year
RB	Ryquell Armstead	24	Jacksonville Jaguars	2 years, $1.82 million

=== Draft ===
2021 New York Giants Draft
Round	Selection	Player	Position	College
1	20	Kadarius Toney	WR	Florida
2	50	Azeez Ojulari	LB	Georgia
3	71	Aaron Robinson	CB	UCF
4	116	Elerson Smith	LB	Northern Iowa
6	196	Gary Brightwell	RB	Arizona
6	201	Rodarius Williams	CB	Oklahoma State

=== Undrafted free agents ===
Player	Position	College
Brett Heggie	OL	Florida
Jake Burton	OL	Baylor
Raymond Johnson	DE	Georgia Southern

== Staff ==
2021 New York Giants staff
Front office: President/CEO – John Mara; Chairman/executive vice president – Steve Tisch; Senior vice president & general manager – Dave Gettleman; Vice president of football operations/assistant general manager – Kevin Abrams; Senior vice president of player personnel – Chris Mara; Director of player personnel – Mark Koncz; Director of pro personnel – Ken Sternfeld; Director of college scouting – Chris Pettit; Pro scout – Tim McDonnell; Director of football operations – Ed Triggs; Senior personnel executive – Kyle O'Brien; Head coaches: Head coach – Joe Judge; Assistant head coach/defensive coordinator – Patrick Graham; Offensive coaches: Offensive coordinator – Jason Garrett (fired after week 11); Senior Offensive Assistant/Interim Offensive coordinator – Freddie Kitchens; Quarterbacks – Jerry Schuplinski; Running backs – Burton Burns; Wide receivers – Tyke Tolbert; Tight ends – Derek Dooley; Offensive line – Rob Sale; Assistant offensive line – Ben Wilkerson; Offensive assistant – Jody Wright; Offensive quality control – Nick Williams; Offensive quality control – Russ Callaway	Defensive coaches: Defensive line – Sean Spencer; Linebackers – Kevin Sherrer; Assistant linebackers – Anthony Blevins; Defensive backs – Jerome Henderson; Assistant defensive backs – Michael Treier; Senior defensive assistant – Jeremy Pruitt; Defensive quality control – Ryan Anderson; Defensive quality control – Carter Blount; Special teams coaches: Special teams coordinator – Thomas McGaughey; Assistant special teams – Tom Quinn; Coaching Assistants: Special projects & situations – Amos Jones; Chief of staff – Ryan Hollern; Consultant – Pat Flaherty; Strength and conditioning: Director of strength and performance – Craig Fitzgerald; Assistant strength and performance – Drew Wilson; Performance manager/assistant strength and performance – Sam Coad

== Final roster ==
2021 New York Giants roster
Quarterbacks (QB): 17 Jake Fromm; 2 Mike Glennon; Running backs (RB): 26 Saquon Barkley; 28 Devontae Booker; 36 Cullen Gillaspia FB; 39 Elijhaa Penny FB; Wide receivers (WR): 19 Kenny Golladay; 15 Collin Johnson; 12 John Ross; 84 David Sills; 86 Darius Slayton; 89 Kadarius Toney; Tight ends (TE): 88 Evan Engram; 80 Kyle Rudolph	Offensive linemen (OL): 68 Ben Bredeson G; 79 Korey Cunningham T; 71 Will Hernandez G; 63 Wes Martin G; 69 Billy Price C; 67 Matt Skura C; 76 Nate Solder T; 78 Andrew Thomas T; Defensive linemen (DL): 98 Austin Johnson NT; 91 Raymond Johnson DE; 97 Dexter Lawrence DE; 75 Danny Shelton NT; 99 Leonard Williams DE	Linebackers (LB): 47 Cam Brown OLB; 59 Lorenzo Carter OLB; 48 Tae Crowder ILB; 49 Benardrick McKinney ILB; 51 Azeez Ojulari OLB; 55 Reggie Ragland ILB; 95 Quincy Roche OLB; 45 Jaylon Smith ILB; 53 Oshane Ximines OLB; Defensive backs (DB): 24 James Bradberry CB; 31 Keion Crossen CB; 22 Adoree' Jackson CB; 20 Julian Love SS; 29 Xavier McKinney FS; 38 Steven Parker SS; 27 J. R. Reed FS; 33 Aaron Robinson CB; 23 Logan Ryan FS; 34 Jarren Williams CB; Special teams (ST): 9 Riley Dixon P; 5 Graham Gano K; 58 Casey Kreiter LS	Practice squad: 81 Alex Bachman WR; 44 Omari Cobb OLB; 83 Pharoh Cooper WR; 62 Devery Hamilton T; 90 Woodrow Hamilton NT (COVID-19); 72 Jonotthan Harrison C (PS/I); 49 Jake Hausmann TE; 37 Ka'dar Hollman CB (PS/I); 33 Natrell Jamerson SS; 28 Dwayne Johnson CB; 61 Derrick Kelly T; 57 Niko Lalos OLB; 6 Brian Lewerke QB; 96 David Moa DE; 34 Sandro Platzgummer RB (IPP); 18 Clayton Thorson QB; 13 Travis Toivonen WR; 87 Deon Yelder TE; Reserve: 18 C. J. Board WR (IR); 37 Gary Brightwell RB (IR); 35 T. J. Brunson ILB (IR); 52 Carter Coughlin ILB (IR); 43 Nate Ebner SS (IR); 65 Nick Gates G (IR); 46 Justin Hilliard ILB (IR); 30 Darnay Holmes CB (IR); -- Rysen John TE (IR); 8 Daniel Jones QB (IR); -- Joshua Kalu SS (IR); 66 Shane Lemieux G (IR); 54 Blake Martinez ILB (IR); 60 Kyle Murphy G (IR); 74 Matt Peart T (IR); 21 Jabrill Peppers SS (IR); -- Dante Pettis WR (IR); 3 Sterling Shepard WR (IR); 94 Elerson Smith OLB (IR); 82 Kaden Smith TE (IR); 85 Levine Toilolo TE (IR); 25 Rodarius Williams CB (IR); Rookies in italics 49 active, 22 reserve, 14 practice squad (4 exempt)

== Preseason ==
Week	Date	Opponent	Result	Record	Venue	Recap
1	August 14	New York Jets	L 7–12	0–1	MetLife Stadium	Recap
2	August 22	at Cleveland Browns	L 13–17	0–2	FirstEnergy Stadium	Recap
3	August 29	New England Patriots	L 20–22	0–3	MetLife Stadium	Recap

== Regular season ==
=== Schedule ===
The schedule was announced on May 12.

Week	Date	Opponent	Result	Record	Venue	Recap
1	September 12	Denver Broncos	**L** 13–27	0–1	MetLife Stadium	Recap
2	September 16	at **Washington Football Team**	**L** 29–30	0–2	FedExField	Recap
3	September 26	Atlanta Falcons	**L** 14–17	0–3	MetLife Stadium	Recap
4	October 3	at New Orleans Saints	**W** 27–21 (OT)	1–3	Caesars Superdome	Recap
5	October 10	at **Dallas Cowboys**	**L** 20–44	1–4	AT&T Stadium	Recap
6	October 17	Los Angeles Rams	**L** 11–38	1–5	MetLife Stadium	Recap
7	October 24	Carolina Panthers	**W** 25–3	2–5	MetLife Stadium	Recap
8	November 1	at Kansas City Chiefs	**L** 17–20	2–6	Arrowhead Stadium	Recap
9	November 7	Las Vegas Raiders	**W** 23–16	3–6	MetLife Stadium	Recap
10	Bye					
11	November 22	at Tampa Bay Buccaneers	**L** 10–30	3–7	Raymond James Stadium	Recap
12	November 28	**Philadelphia Eagles**	**W** 13–7	4–7	MetLife Stadium	Recap
13	December 5	at Miami Dolphins	**L** 9–20	4–8	Hard Rock Stadium	Recap
14	December 12	at Los Angeles Chargers	**L** 21–37	4–9	SoFi Stadium	Recap
15	December 19	**Dallas Cowboys**	**L** 6–21	4–10	MetLife Stadium	Recap
16	December 26	at **Philadelphia Eagles**	**L** 10–34	4–11	Lincoln Financial Field	Recap
17	January 2	at Chicago Bears	**L** 3–29	4–12	Soldier Field	Recap
18	January 9	**Washington Football Team**	**L** 7–22	4–13	MetLife Stadium	Recap

Note: Intra-division opponents are in bold text.

=== Game summaries ===
==== Week 1: vs. Denver Broncos ====
Week 1: Denver Broncos at New York Giants – Game summary

Quarter	1	2	3	4	Total
**Broncos**	0	10	7	10	**27**
Giants	0	7	0	6	**13**

at MetLife Stadium, East Rutherford, New Jersey

- Date: September 12
- Game time: 4:25 p.m. EDT
- Game weather: Fair, 84 °F (29 °C)
- Game attendance: 74,119
- Referee: Ronald Torbert
- TV announcers (Fox): Adam Amin, Mark Schlereth and Shannon Spake
- Recap, Game Book

Game information

**First quarter**

- No scoring plays

**Second quarter**

- DEN – Brandon McManus 23-yard field goal, 13:21. Broncos 3–0. **Drive: 15 plays, 62 yards, 8:42.**
- NYG – Sterling Shepard 38-yard pass from Daniel Jones (Graham Gano kick), 9:07. Giants 7–3. **Drive: 7 plays, 75 yards, 4:22.**
- DEN – Tim Patrick 2-yard pass from Teddy Bridgewater (Brandon McManus kick), 0:13. Broncos 10–7. **Drive: 7 plays, 57 yards, 2:17.**

**Third quarter**

- DEN – Albert Okwuegbunam 4-yard pass from Teddy Bridgewater (Brandon McManus kick), 6:58. Broncos 17–7. **Drive: 16 plays, 75 yards, 8:12.**

**Fourth quarter**

- DEN – Brandon McManus 36-yard field goal, 12:49. Broncos 20–7. **Drive: 10 plays, 69 yards, 5:03.**
- DEN – Melvin Gordon 70-yard run (Brandon McManus kick), 4:48. Broncos 27–7. **Drive: 4 plays, 94 yards, 1:48.**
- NYG – Daniel Jones 4-yard run, 0:00. Broncos 27–13. **Drive: 8 plays, 64 yards, 1:49.**

**Top passers**

- DEN – Teddy Bridgewater – 28/36, 264 yards, 2 TD
- NYG – Daniel Jones – 22/37, 267 yards, TD

**Top rushers**

- DEN – Melvin Gordon – 11 rushes, 101 yards, TD
- NYG – Daniel Jones – 6 rushes, 27 yards, TD

**Top receivers**

- DEN – Jerry Jeudy – 6 receptions, 72 yards
- NYG – Sterling Shepard – 7 receptions, 113 yards, TD

Former Giants head coach turned Broncos offensive coordinator Pat Shurmur returned to MetLife Stadium with Teddy Bridgewater in his first start with the team.

With 2:41 left in the second quarter and the Giants leading 7–3, their offense gave the Broncos the ball and didn't get back on the field until they were trailing 17–7. On the ensuing drive Daniel Jones had a key fumble giving the ball back to Denver, who then kicked a field goal to make it 20–7. Broncos running back Melvin Gordon later broke through with a 70-yard touchdown run, sealing the win for Denver. Shurmur won his revenge game, and the Giants were 0–1 for the fifth consecutive year and eighth time in nine years.

==== Week 2: at Washington Football Team ====
Week 2: New York Giants at Washington Football Team – Game summary

Quarter	1	2	3	4	Total
Giants	7	3	10	9	**29**
**Washington**	0	14	3	13	**30**

at FedExField, Landover, Maryland

- Date: September 16
- Game time: 8:20 p.m. EDT
- Game weather: Rain, 72 °F (22 °C)
- Game attendance: 50,118
- Referee: Scott Novak
- TV announcers (NFLN): Joe Buck, Troy Aikman, Erin Andrews and Kristina Pink
- Recap, Game Book

Game information

**First quarter**

- NYG – Daniel Jones 6-yard run (Graham Gano kick), 7:35. Giants 7–0. **Drive: 11 plays, 79 yards, 5:55.**

**Second quarter**

- WAS – Terry McLaurin 11-yard pass from Taylor Heinicke (Dustin Hopkins kick), 11:16. Tied 7–7. **Drive: 13 plays, 90 yards, 7:01.**
- NYG – Graham Gano 23-yard field goal, 4:09. Giants 10–7. **Drive: 10 plays, 73 yards, 4:09.**
- WAS – J. D. McKissic 2-yard run (Dustin Hopkins kick), 0:21. Football Team 14–10. **Drive: 12 plays, 84 yards, 3:48.**

**Third quarter**

- NYG – Graham Gano 47-yard field goal, 9:07. Football Team 14–13. **Drive: 9 plays, 46 yards, 5:53.**
- NYG – Darius Slayton 33-yard pass from Daniel Jones (Graham Gano kick), 4:41. Giants 20–14. **Drive: 7 plays, 65 yards, 2:50.**
- WAS – Dustin Hopkins 49-yard field goal, 1:30. Giants 20–17. **Drive: 7 plays, 44 yards, 3:11.**

**Fourth quarter**

- NYG – Graham Gano 52-yard field goal, 13:35. Giants 23–17. **Drive: 6 plays, 41 yards, 2:55.**
- WAS – Dustin Hopkins 37-yard field goal, 8:46. Giants 23–20. **Drive: 11 plays, 56 yards, 4:49.**
- NYG – Graham Gano 55-yard field goal, 4:50. Giants 26–20. **Drive: 8 plays, 38 yards, 3:56.**
- WAS – Ricky Seals-Jones 19-yard pass from Taylor Heinicke (Dustin Hopkins kick), 4:33. Football Team 27–26. **Drive: 2 plays, 75 yards, 0:17.**
- NYG – Graham Gano 35-yard field goal, 2:00. Giants 29–27. **Drive: 4 plays, 3 yards, 0:16.**
- WAS – Dustin Hopkins 43-yard field goal, 0:00. Football Team 30–29. **Drive: 11 plays, 50 yards, 2:00.**

**Top passers**

- NYG – Daniel Jones – 22/32, 249 yards, TD
- WAS – Taylor Heinicke – 34/46, 336 yards, 2 TD, INT

**Top rushers**

- NYG – Daniel Jones – 9 rushes, 95 yards, TD
- WAS – Antonio Gibson – 13 rushes, 69 yards

**Top receivers**

- NYG – Sterling Shepard – 9 receptions, 94 yards
- WAS – Terry McLaurin – 11 receptions, 107 yards, TD

Despite a strong performance by Daniel Jones and scoring their season high in points, the Giants were plagued by miscues; a Jones touchdown run nullified by a holding penalty, a wide open touchdown drop by Darius Slayton, and finally an offside penalty by Dexter Lawrence during a missed field goal on the final play of the game, which gave Washington another chance. The Giants dropped to 0–2 for the fifth consecutive year and eighth time in nine years, and broke a five-game winning streak against Washington, losing to them for the first time since 2018. The next day, it was revealed that Lawrence was not offside and in fact jumped when the ball was snapped. The Giants also lost starting center and team captain Nick Gates for the season to a gruesome leg injury.

==== Week 3: vs. Atlanta Falcons ====
Week 3: Atlanta Falcons at New York Giants – Game summary

Quarter	1	2	3	4	Total
**Falcons**	0	7	0	10	**17**
Giants	3	3	0	8	**14**

at MetLife Stadium, East Rutherford, New Jersey

- Date: September 26
- Game time: 1:00 p.m. EDT
- Game weather: Sunny, 70 °F (21 °C)
- Game attendance: 75,307
- Referee: Adrian Hill
- TV announcers (Fox): Kenny Albert, Jonathan Vilma and Sara Walsh
- Recap, Game Book

Game information

**First quarter**

- NYG – Graham Gano 25-yard field goal, 6:58. Giants 3–0. **Drive: 11 plays, 73 yards, 5:16.**

**Second quarter**

- NYG – Graham Gano 31-yard field goal, 8:13. Giants 6–0. **Drive: 15 plays, 73 yards, 7:38.**
- ATL – Olamide Zaccheaus 4-yard pass from Matt Ryan (Younghoe Koo kick), 1:33. Falcons 7–6. **Drive: 6 plays, 44 yards, 0:36.**

**Third quarter**

- No scoring plays.

**Fourth quarter**

- NYG – Saquon Barkley 1-yard run (Daniel Jones run), 12:53. Giants 14–7. **Drive: 10 plays, 71 yards, 5:10.**
- ATL – Lee Smith 1-yard pass from Matt Ryan (Younghoe Koo kick), 4:13. Tied 14–14. **Drive: 15 plays, 72 yards, 8:40.**
- ATL – Younghoe Koo 40-yard field goal, 0:00. Falcons 17–14. **Drive: 7 plays, 58 yards, 1:50.**

**Top passers**

- ATL – Matt Ryan – 27/36, 243 yards, 2 TD
- NYG – Daniel Jones – 24/35, 266 yards

**Top rushers**

- ATL – Mike Davis – 12 rushes, 50 yards
- NYG – Saquon Barkley – 16 rushes, 51 yards, TD

**Top receivers**

- ATL – Cordarrelle Patterson – 6 receptions, 82 yards
- NYG – Kenny Golladay – 4 receptions, 64 yards

The Giants retired Eli Manning's number 10 at halftime. His first career start in 2004 and only home playoff win in 2011 were both against the Falcons.

With 5:07 to go and a 14–7 lead, new cornerback Adoree Jackson dropped a possible game sealing interception in the end zone, and the Falcons tied the score 2 plays later on a touchdown pass to Olamide Zaccheaus. The Giants got the ball to midfield only to punt it away, and Falcons Pro Bowl kicker Younghoe Koo capped off a 6-play, 59-yard drive with a game-winning 41-yard field goal. For the second time in as many games, the Giants dropped potential game winning passes and lost on the last play of the game. The Giants were dealt another blow after the game when they learned linebacker and captain Blake Martinez suffered a torn ACL and would miss the remainder of the season.

==== Week 4: at New Orleans Saints ====
Week 4: New York Giants at New Orleans Saints – Game summary

Quarter	1	2	3	4	OT	Total
**Giants**	0	7	3	11	6	**27**
Saints	0	7	7	7	0	**21**

at Caesars Superdome, New Orleans, Louisiana

- Date: October 3
- Game time: 1:00 p.m. EDT/12:00 p.m. CDT
- Game weather: None (indoor stadium)
- Game attendance: 69,170
- Referee: Brad Rogers
- TV announcers (Fox): Kenny Albert, Jonathan Vilma and Sara Walsh
- Recap, Game Book

Game information

**First quarter**

- No scoring plays.

**Second quarter**

- NYG – John Ross 52-yard pass from Daniel Jones (Graham Gano kick), 8:51. Giants 7–0. **Drive: 9 plays, 75 yards, 5:06.**
- NO – Juwan Johnson 15-yard pass from Jameis Winston (Aldrick Rosas kick), 0:23. Tied 7–7. **Drive: 13 plays, 75 yards, 8:28.**

**Third quarter**

- NO – Taysom Hill 8-yard run (Aldrick Rosas kick), 13:24. Saints 14–7. **Drive: 3 plays, 75 yards, 1:36.**
- NYG – Graham Gano 23-yard field goal, 8:36. Saints 14–10. **Drive: 10 plays, 70 yards, 4:48.**

**Fourth quarter**

- NO – Taysom Hill 8-yard run (Aldrick Rosas kick), 12:09. Saints 21–10. **Drive: 11 plays, 63 yards, 6:14.**
- NYG – Saquon Barkley 54-yard pass from Daniel Jones (Daniel Jones run), 6:52. Saints 21–18. **Drive: 1 play, 54 yards, 0:09.**
- NYG – Graham Gano 48-yard field goal, 0:31. Tied 21–21. **Drive: 11 plays, 59 yards, 2:30.**

**Overtime**

- NYG – Saquon Barkley 6-yard run, 4:54. Giants 27–21. **Drive: 9 plays, 75 yards, 5:06.**

**Top passers**

- NYG – Daniel Jones – 28/40, 402 yards, 2 TD, INT
- NO – Jameis Winston – 17/23, 226 yards, TD

**Top rushers**

- NYG – Saquon Barkley – 13 rushes, 52 yards, TD
- NO – Alvin Kamara – 26 rushes, 120 yards

**Top receivers**

- NYG – Kenny Golladay – 6 receptions, 116 yards
- NO – Marquez Callaway – 2 receptions, 74 yards

The Giants appeared all but down and out after two Taysom Hill rushing touchdowns for the Saints. After a 26-yard punt return, Daniel Jones and Saquon Barkley gave the Giants new life on a 56-yard touchdown catch and run, and a 2-point conversion to make it a 21–18 game with 6:52 to play. After a defensive stop, Jones led the Giants on a game-tying drive forcing overtime. The Giants won the toss and immediately scored a touchdown on a 6-yard run by Barkley, winning their first game of the season and stunning the Saints fans in the Superdome.

For his performance, Daniel Jones was selected as the NFC Player of the Week.

==== Week 5: at Dallas Cowboys ====
Week 5: New York Giants at Dallas Cowboys – Game summary

Quarter	1	2	3	4	Total
Giants	0	10	3	7	**20**
**Cowboys**	3	14	10	17	**44**

at AT&T Stadium, Arlington, Texas

- Date: October 10
- Game time: 4:25 p.m. EDT/3:25 p.m. CDT
- Game weather: None (retractable roof closed)
- Game attendance: 93,476
- Referee: John Hussey
- TV announcers (Fox): Joe Buck, Troy Aikman, Erin Andrews, and Tom Rinaldi
- Recap, Game Book

Game information

**First quarter**

- DAL – Greg Zuerlein 31-yard field goal, 6:17. Cowboys 3–0. **Drive: 10 plays, 44 yards, 4:30.**

**Second quarter**

- DAL – CeeDee Lamb 49-yard pass from Dak Prescott (Greg Zuerlein kick), 11:59. Cowboys 10–0. **Drive: 4 plays, 65 yards, 1:59.**
- NYG – Graham Gano 51-yard field goal, 10:10. Cowboys 10–3. **Drive: 7 plays, 42 yards, 1:49.**
- NYG – Devontae Booker 1-yard run (Graham Gano kick), 2:51. Tied 10–10. **Drive: 12 plays, 88 yards, 5:51.**
- DAL – Amari Cooper 24-yard pass from Dak Prescott (Greg Zuerlein kick), 0:36. Cowboys 17–10. **Drive: 8 plays, 75 yards, 2:15.**

**Third quarter**

- NYG – Graham Gano 51-yard field goal, 11:14. Cowboys 17–13. **Drive: 7 plays, 42 yards, 3:46.**
- DAL – Ezekiel Elliott 4-yard pass from Dak Prescott (Greg Zuerlein kick), 7:11. Cowboys 24–13. **Drive: 10 plays, 75 yards, 4:03.**
- DAL – Greg Zuerlein 38-yard field goal, 2:02. Cowboys 27–13. **Drive: 8 plays, 39 yards, 4:55.**

**Fourth quarter**

- DAL – Ezekiel Elliott 13-yard run (Greg Zuerlein kick), 7:34. Cowboys 34–13. **Drive: 9 plays, 98 yards, 4:48.**
- NYG – Devontae Booker 3-yard pass from Mike Glennon (Graham Gano kick), 3:17. Cowboys 34–20. **Drive: 11 plays, 75 yards, 4:17.**
- DAL – Greg Zuerlein 31-yard field goal, 1:53. Cowboys 37–20. **Drive: 8 plays, 33 yards, 1:24.**
- DAL – Anthony Brown 45-yard interception return (Greg Zuerlein kick), 1:28. Cowboys 44–20.

**Top passers**

- NYG – Mike Glennon – 16/25, 196 yards, TD, 2 INT
- DAL – Dak Prescott – 22/32, 302 yards, 3 TD, INT

**Top rushers**

- NYG – Devontae Booker – 16 rushes, 42 yards, TD
- DAL – Ezekiel Elliott – 21 rushes, 110 yards, TD

**Top receivers**

- NYG – Kadarius Toney – 10 receptions, 189 yards
- DAL – CeeDee Lamb – 4 receptions, 84 yards, TD

An already depleted Giants squad lost Saquon Barkley, Daniel Jones, and Kenny Golladay in the first half. A bright spot for the Giants was the breakout game for Kadarius Toney, who finished with 10 receptions for 189 yards. Despite the performance, Toney was ejected for punching a Cowboys defender in a skirmish late in the 4th quarter.

==== Week 6: vs. Los Angeles Rams ====
Week 6: Los Angeles Rams at New York Giants – Game summary

Quarter	1	2	3	4	Total
**Rams**	0	28	3	7	**38**
Giants	3	0	0	8	**11**

at MetLife Stadium, East Rutherford, New Jersey

- Date: October 17
- Game time: 1:00 p.m. EDT
- Game weather: Partly cloudy, 64 °F (18 °C)
- Game attendance: 73,920
- Referee: Alex Kemp
- TV announcers (Fox): Adam Amin, Mark Schlereth and Shannon Spake
- Recap, Game Book

Game information

**First quarter**

- NYG – Graham Gano 27-yard field goal, 9:21. Giants 3–0. **Drive: 14 plays, 73 yards, 5:39.**

**Second quarter**

- LAR – Robert Woods 15-yard pass from Matthew Stafford (Matt Gay kick), 10:28. Rams 7–3. **Drive: 6 plays, 66 yards, 3:05.**
- LAR – Cooper Kupp 3-yard pass from Matthew Stafford (Matt Gay kick), 8:06. Rams 14–3. **Drive: 4 plays, 12 yards, 1:17.**
- LAR – Darrell Henderson 2-yard run (Matt Gay kick), 3:36. Rams 21–3. **Drive: 4 plays, 14 yards, 1:17.**
- LAR – Darrell Henderson 25-yard pass from Matthew Stafford (Matt Gay kick), 0:33. Rams 28–3. **Drive: 6 plays, 73 yards, 1:41.**

**Third quarter**

- LAR – Matt Gay 32-yard field goal, 5:45. Rams 31–3. **Drive: 13 plays, 68 yards, 9:15.**

**Fourth quarter**

- LAR – Cooper Kupp 13-yard pass from Matthew Stafford (Matt Gay kick), 11:55. Rams 38–3. **Drive: 9 plays, 49 yards, 5:03.**
- NYG – Elijhaa Penny 4-yard run (Daniel Jones-Kyle Rudolph pass), 6:21. Rams 38–11. **Drive: 12 plays, 53 yards, 3:27.**

**Top passers**

- LAR – Matthew Stafford – 22/28, 251 yards, 4 TD, INT
- NYG – Daniel Jones – 29/51, 242 yards, 3 INT

**Top rushers**

- LAR – Darrell Henderson – 21 rushes, 78 yards, TD
- NYG – Devontae Booker – 12 rushes, 41 yards

**Top receivers**

- LAR – Cooper Kupp – 9 receptions, 130 yards, 2 TD
- NYG – Sterling Shepard – 10 receptions, 76 yards

In a Scorigami game where the Giants honored the 2011 championship team at halftime, they were down 28–3 after surrendering four 2nd quarter touchdowns. Daniel Jones, who cleared concussion protocol to start the game, threw for 3 interceptions.

Rookie Kadarius Toney suffered an ankle injury on the Giants opening drive and did not return to the game.

==== Week 7: vs. Carolina Panthers ====
Week 7: Carolina Panthers at New York Giants – Game summary

Quarter	1	2	3	4	Total
Panthers	3	0	0	0	**3**
**Giants**	0	5	7	13	**25**

at MetLife Stadium, East Rutherford, New Jersey

- Date: October 24
- Game time: 1:00 p.m. EDT
- Game weather: Mostly cloudy, 57 °F (14 °C)
- Game attendance: 71,899
- Referee: Carl Cheffers
- TV announcers (Fox): Adam Amin, Mark Schlereth and Shannon Spake
- Recap, Game Book

Game information

**First quarter**

- CAR – Zane Gonzalez 45-yard field goal, 8:37. Panthers 3–0. **Drive: 13 plays, 46 yards, 6:23.**

**Second quarter**

- NYG – Penalty on Sam Darnold enforced in end zone for a safety, 14:53. Panthers 3–2.
- NYG – Graham Gano 49-yard field goal, 12:53. Giants 5–3. **Drive: 6 plays, 32 yards, 2:00.**

**Third quarter**

- NYG – Dante Pettis 5-yard pass from Daniel Jones (Graham Gano kick), 0:59. Giants 12–3. **Drive: 11 plays, 75 yards, 6:33.**

**Fourth quarter**

- NYG – Graham Gano 53-yard field goal, 12:41. Giants 15–3. **Drive: 6 plays, 19 yards, 2:10.**
- NYG – Graham Gano 44-yard field goal, 5:54. Giants 18–3. **Drive: 10 plays, 32 yards, 5:32.**
- NYG – Devontae Booker 19-yard run (Graham Gano kick), 4:46. Giants 25–3. **Drive: 1 play, 19 yards, 0:06.**

**Top passers**

- CAR – Sam Darnold – 16/25, 111 yards, INT
- NYG – Daniel Jones – 23/33, 203 yards, TD

**Top rushers**

- CAR – Chuba Hubbard – 12 rushes, 28 yards
- NYG – Devontae Booker – 14 rushes, 51 yards, TD

**Top receivers**

- CAR – D. J. Moore – 6 receptions, 73 yards
- NYG – Darius Slayton – 5 receptions, 63 yards

The Giants won their second game of the season with dominant defensive play, holding the Panthers to 173 total yards, and benching quarterback Sam Darnold. After surrendering an opening drive field goal, they only allowed 7 first downs over the next 11 drives, 8 of which ended three-and-out. They also totaled a safety, interception, and 6 sacks.

Daniel Jones finished with 247 all purpose yards, including a 16-yard one-handed catch from wide receiver Dante Pettis in the 3rd quarter.

It was later announced that captain and starting safety Jabrill Peppers tore his ACL in the contest and would miss the remainder of the season. He signed with the New England Patriots in the offseason.

==== Week 8: at Kansas City Chiefs ====
Week 8: New York Giants at Kansas City Chiefs – Game summary

Quarter	1	2	3	4	Total
Giants	0	10	0	7	**17**
**Chiefs**	7	7	0	6	**20**

at Arrowhead Stadium, Kansas City, Missouri

- Date: November 1
- Game time: 8:15 p.m. EDT/7:15 p.m. CDT
- Game weather: 39 °F (4 °C)
- Game attendance: 72,898
- Referee: Jerome Boger
- TV announcers (ESPN): Steve Levy, Brian Griese, Louis Riddick, Lisa Salters and John Parry
- Recap, Game Book

Game information

**First quarter**

- KC – Tyreek Hill 6-yard pass from Patrick Mahomes (Harrison Butker kick), 6:12. Chiefs 7–0. **Drive: 4 plays, 13 yards, 1:25.**

**Second quarter**

- NYG – Kyle Rudolph 1-yard pass from Daniel Jones (Graham Gano kick), 14:14. Tied 7–7. **Drive: 9 plays, 85 yards, 4:02.**
- KC – Derrick Gore 3-yard run (Harrison Butker kick), 6:37. Chiefs 14–7. **Drive: 11 plays, 68 yards, 5:46.**
- NYG – Graham Gano 23-yard field goal, 2:45. Chiefs 14–10. **Drive: 8 plays, 86 yards, 3:52.**

**Third quarter**

- No scoring plays.

**Fourth quarter**

- NYG – Evan Engram 5-yard pass from Daniel Jones (Graham Gano kick), 14:53. Giants 17–14. **Drive: 8 plays, 57 yards, 3:34.**
- KC – Harrison Butker 36-yard field goal, 8:53. Tied 17–17. **Drive: 14 plays, 57 yards, 6:00.**
- KC – Harrison Butker 34-yard field goal, 1:07. Chiefs 20–17. **Drive: 9 plays, 55 yards, 3:34.**

**Top passers**

- NYG – Daniel Jones – 22/32, 222 yards, 2 TD, INT
- KC – Patrick Mahomes – 29/48, 275 yards, TD, INT

**Top rushers**

- NYG – Devontae Booker – 15 rushes, 60 yards
- KC – Darrel Williams – 13 rushes, 49 yards

**Top receivers**

- NYG – John Ross – 2 receptions, 72 yards
- KC – Tyreek Hill – 12 receptions, 94 yards, TD

Both teams played a sloppy and undisciplined game on a cold night in Kansas City. The Chiefs opened up with a 13 play drive only to be intercepted at the goal line. However, Daniel Jones threw a pick two plays later and Tyreek Hill opened the scoring for the Chiefs. The Giants managed to make some stops on defense and made the game competitive with a couple of scoring drives, including Kyle Rudolph's first touchdown with the Giants. Evan Engram scored his first touchdown of the season in the fourth quarter to give the Giants the lead, and the Chiefs tied it with a field goal of their own.

Throughout the game, penalties and clock mismanagement became an issue, especially for the Giants in the 4th quarter. In a 17–17 tie game, fullback Elijhaa Penny had a controversial taunting penalty nullify yardage gained from a first down, and a Patrick Mahomes interception on the next drive was nullified by an offsides penalty from Oshane Ximines. The Chiefs took advantage winding down the clock and kicking a game-winning field goal with 1:07 to play. The Giants didn't have any timeouts and couldn't muster much of an opportunity to extend the game. With the loss, the Giants fell to 2–6 or worse for the 5th consecutive year.

==== Week 9: vs. Las Vegas Raiders ====
Week 9: Las Vegas Raiders at New York Giants – Game summary

Quarter	1	2	3	4	Total
Raiders	7	6	3	0	**16**
**Giants**	7	3	7	6	**23**

at MetLife Stadium, East Rutherford, New Jersey

- Date: November 7
- Game time: 1:00 p.m. EST
- Game weather: Fair, 54 °F (12 °C)
- Game attendance: 74,512
- Referee: Clay Martin
- TV announcers (CBS): Kevin Harlan, Trent Green and Melanie Collins
- Recap, Game Book

Game information

**First quarter**

- NYG – Evan Engram 30-yard pass from Daniel Jones (Graham Gano kick), 10:46. **Giants 7–0.** Drive: 7 plays, 75 yards, 4:14.
- LV – Hunter Renfrow 2-yard pass from Derek Carr (Daniel Carlson kick), 5:44. **Tied 7–7.** Drive: 10 plays, 73 yards, 5:02.

**Second quarter**

- LV – Daniel Carlson 25-yard field goal, 14:48. **Raiders 10–7.** Drive: 6 plays, 24 yards, 1:21.
- NYG – Graham Gano 35-yard field goal, 3:24. **Tied 10–10.** Drive: 9 plays, 43 yards, 5:14.
- LV – Daniel Carlson 32-yard field goal, 0:06. **Raiders 13–10.** Drive: 10 plays, 56 yards, 3:18.

**Third quarter**

- NYG – Xavier McKinney 41-yard interception return (Graham Gano kick), 13:28. **Giants 17–13.**
- LV – Daniel Carlson 25-yard field goal, 5:20. **Giants 17–16.** Drive: 15 plays, 85 yards, 8:08.

**Fourth quarter**

- NYG – Graham Gano 32-yard field goal, 14:07. **Giants 20–16.** Drive: 13 plays, 62 yards, 6:13.
- NYG – Graham Gano 38-yard field goal, 3:21. **Giants 23–16.** Drive: 6 plays, 30 yards, 1:47.

**Top passers**

- LV – Derek Carr – 30/46, 296 yards, TD, 2 INT
- NYG – Daniel Jones – 15/20, 110 yards, TD

**Top rushers**

- LV – Josh Jacobs – 13 rushes, 76 yards
- NYG – Devontae Booker – 21 rushes, 99 yards

**Top receivers**

- LV – Darren Waller – 7 receptions, 92 yards
- NYG – Evan Engram – 3 receptions, 38 yards, TD

Evan Engram scored a 30-yard touchdown on the Giants opening drive, and Hunter Renfrow responded in kind for the Raiders. After a Daniel Jones fumble in his own end, the Raiders kicked a field goal to lead 10–7. Both teams traded another set of field goals and the Raiders had a 13–10 halftime lead.

On the opening drive of the second half, Raiders quarterback Derek Carr was intercepted by Xavier McKinney who scored a touchdown to make it 17–13 Giants. After trading another set of field goals, the Raiders subsequent red zone drive in the 4th quarter was cut short by a 25-yard missed field goal by Raiders kicker Daniel Carlson. McKinney recorded a second interception, and the Giants kicked a field goal after forcing the Raiders to burn their timeouts and led 23–16 for the final drive. Carr marched the Raiders down the field and into the red zone, but was strip-sacked by rookie Quincy Roche, his first in the NFL, which was recovered by Leonard Williams to seal the victory for the Giants. The Raiders outgained the Giants 403–245 in yards and 24–16 in first downs, but the Raiders were 1–6 in the red zone.

The Giants improved to 3–6 with this win heading into their bye week. For his performance, Xavier McKinney was honored as the NFC Defensive Player of the Week.

==== Week 11: at Tampa Bay Buccaneers ====
Week 11: New York Giants at Tampa Bay Buccaneers – Game summary

Quarter	1	2	3	4	Total
Giants	3	7	0	0	**10**
**Buccaneers**	7	10	10	3	**30**

at Raymond James Stadium, Tampa, Florida

- Date: November 22
- Game time: 8:15 p.m. EST
- Game weather: Cloudy, 69 °F (21 °C)
- Game attendance: 65,643
- Referee: Craig Wrolstad
- TV announcers (ESPN): Steve Levy, Brian Griese, Louis Riddick, Lisa Salters and John Parry
- Recap, Game Book

Game information

**First quarter**

- TB – Chris Godwin 13-yard pass from Tom Brady (Ryan Succop kick), 11:03. Buccaneers 7–0. **Drive: 8 plays, 73 yards, 3:57.**
- NYG – Graham Gano 37-yard field goal, 4:04. Buccaneers 7–3. **Drive: 13 plays, 56 yards, 6:59.**

**Second quarter**

- TB – Ryan Succop 25-yard field goal, 11:16. Buccaneers 10–3. **Drive: 18 plays, 79 yards, 7:48.**
- NYG – Andrew Thomas 2-yard pass from Daniel Jones (Graham Gano kick), 9:14. Tied 10–10. **Drive: 2 plays, 5 yards, 0:39.**
- TB – Ronald Jones II 6-yard run (Ryan Succop kick), 5:06. Buccaneers 17–10. **Drive: 8 plays, 71 yards, 4:08.**

**Third quarter**

- TB – Mike Evans 5-yard pass from Tom Brady (Ryan Succop kick), 7:31. Buccaneers 24–10. **Drive: 10 plays, 74 yards, 4:51.**
- TB – Ryan Succop 40-yard field goal, 3:53. Buccaneers 27–10. **Drive: 6 plays, 15 yards, 2:21.**

**Fourth quarter**

- TB – Ryan Succop 30-yard field goal, 7:44. Buccaneers 30–10. **Drive: 5 plays, 27 yards, 2:18.**

**Top passers**

- NYG – Daniel Jones – 23/38, 167 yards, TD, 2 INT
- TB – Tom Brady – 30/46, 307 yards, 2 TD, INT

**Top rushers**

- NYG – Saquon Barkley – 6 rushes, 25 yards
- TB – Leonard Fournette – 10 rushes, 35 yards

**Top receivers**

- NYG – Kadarius Toney – 7 receptions, 40 yards
- TB – Mike Evans – 6 receptions, 73 yards, TD

The Giants were overmatched coming out of the bye in front of a national audience and fell to 3-7 and last place in the NFC East. Their only touchdown was set up by an Adoree Jackson interception putting the ball on the 5 yard line, and offensive tackle Andrew Thomas scored his first career touchdown. The Buccaneers offense did not have a single play with negative yardage until Tom Brady was pulled from the game for backup quarterback Blaine Gabbert well into the 4th quarter.

The next day, the Giants announced they fired offensive coordinator Jason Garrett.

==== Week 12: vs. Philadelphia Eagles ====
Week 12: Philadelphia Eagles at New York Giants – Game summary

Quarter	1	2	3	4	Total
Eagles	0	0	0	7	**7**
**Giants**	3	0	7	3	**13**

at MetLife Stadium, East Rutherford, New Jersey

- Date: November 28
- Game time: 1:00 p.m. EST
- Game weather: Overcast, 36 °F (2 °C)
- Game attendance: 73,969
- Referee: Ronald Torbert
- TV announcers (Fox): Adam Amin, Mark Schlereth and Shannon Spake
- Recap, Game Book

Game information

**First quarter**

- NYG – Graham Gano 35-yard field goal, 6:44. Giants 3–0. **Drive: 11 plays, 47 yards, 5:23.**

**Second quarter**

- No scoring plays.

**Third quarter**

- NYG – Chris Myarick 1-yard pass from Daniel Jones (Graham Gano kick), 6:50. Giants 10–0. **Drive: 10 plays, 59 yards, 5:58.**

**Fourth quarter**

- PHI – Boston Scott 1-yard run (Jake Elliott kick), 14:55. Giants 10–7. **Drive: 10 plays, 66 yards, 4:38.**
- NYG – Graham Gano 39-yard field goal, 2:54. Giants 13–7. **Drive: 12 plays, 70 yards, 7:22.**

**Top passers**

- PHI – Jalen Hurts – 14/31, 129 yards, 3 INT
- NYG – Daniel Jones – 19/30, 202 yards, TD

**Top rushers**

- PHI – Jalen Hurts – 8 rushes, 77 yards
- NYG – Saquon Barkley – 13 rushes, 40 yards

**Top receivers**

- PHI – Kenneth Gainwell – 3 receptions, 32 yards
- NYG – Kenny Golladay – 3 receptions, 50 yards

On the day the Giants retired Michael Strahan's 92, the defense rebounded from their lackluster performance in Tampa and played a masterful game. After a first quarter field goal, Eagles quarterback Jalen Hurts was intercepted by Darnay Holmes. The defense preserved the 3-0 first half lead on the last play by stopping an Eagles 15-play, 92-yard drive with a Tae Crowder interception on the goal line, a play that would prove disastrous for the Eagles.

In the third quarter after a fourth down stop, the Giants opened up the scoring when Philadelphia native and Temple University walk-on Chris Myarick made an acrobatic touchdown catch, his first in the NFL, to give the Giants a 10–0 lead. Hurts threw an interception to Xavier McKinney, his third of the day. After that, the Eagles decided to aggressively run the football, rushing for 100 yards in the third quarter alone. Boston Scott got the Eagles on the board in the first play of the fourth quarter with a 1-yard touchdown run. After exchanging punts, Kenny Golladay had two critical first-down receptions putting the Giants in field goal range, extending the lead to 13–7 in the closing minutes.

On the next possession with the Eagles driving, Dexter Lawrence forced a Scott fumble, which Julian Love recovered for the Giants with 1:39 to play. The Giants coaches opted to be extra conservative, making the Eagles burn all three timeouts in 23 seconds, giving them the ball back with 1:11 to play.

After three completions from Hurts to rookie running back Kenneth Gainwell for 32 yards, the Eagles drove to the Giants 27-yard line with 37 seconds to play. On first down, Hurts threw a one-on-one ball to the end zone to Jalen Reagor which bounced out of his hands and into the waiting arms of Love, who himself couldn't hold on to the ball, giving the Eagles another chance. On fourth down after two stops, Hurts threw another pass to Reagor on the goal line, which he dropped again, turning the ball over on downs. It was their sixth of the game, and enough for the Giants to escape with the win.

With the win, the Giants improved to 4–7. This was the first time the Giants had a winning streak against the Eagles since they won 3 in a row from 2007 to 2008. Joe Judge also improved to 4–0 at home against division rivals in his last win as Giants head coach. It was also their third home win in a row, the first time they had done so in five years.

==== Week 13: at Miami Dolphins ====
Week 13: New York Giants at Miami Dolphins – Game summary

Quarter	1	2	3	4	Total
Giants	0	3	3	3	**9**
**Dolphins**	0	10	0	10	**20**

at Hard Rock Stadium, Miami Gardens, Florida

- Date: December 5
- Game time: 1:00 p.m. EST
- Game weather: Partly sunny, 82 °F (28 °C)
- Game attendance: 65,898
- Referee: Brad Allen
- TV announcers (Fox): Chris Myers, Daryl Johnston and Jen Hale
- Recap, Game Book

Game information

**First quarter**

- No scoring plays.

**Second quarter**

- NYG – Graham Gano 39-yard field goal, 13:12. Giants 3–0. **Drive: 7 plays, 16 yards, 2:37.**
- MIA – Jason Sanders 48-yard field goal, 7:07. Tied 3–3. **Drive: 11 plays, 47 yards, 6:05.**
- MIA – Mack Hollins 5-yard pass from Tua Tagovailoa (Jason Sanders kick), 0:26. Dolphins 10–3. **Drive: 14 plays, 89 yards, 3:52.**

**Third quarter**

- NYG – Graham Gano 34-yard field goal, 10:29. Dolphins 10–6. **Drive: 10 plays, 69 yards, 3:31.**

**Fourth quarter**

- MIA – Isaiah Ford 2-yard pass from Tua Tagovailoa (Jason Sanders kick), 11:06. Dolphins 17–6. **Drive: 7 plays, 61 yards, 3:45.**
- NYG – Graham Gano 51-yard field goal, 4:59. Dolphins 17–9. **Drive: 10 plays, 25 yards, 3:43.**
- MIA – Jason Sanders 48-yard field goal, 1:11. Dolphins 20–9. **Drive: 10 plays, 45 yards, 3:48.**

**Top passers**

- NYG – Mike Glennon – 23/44, 187 yards, INT
- MIA – Tua Tagovailoa – 30/41, 244 yards, 2 TD

**Top rushers**

- NYG – Saquon Barkley – 11 rushes, 55 yards
- MIA – Myles Gaskin – 15 rushes, 44 yards

**Top receivers**

- NYG – Evan Engram – 4 receptions, 61 yards
- MIA – Jaylen Waddle – 9 receptions, 90 yards

After the Eagles game, it was revealed Daniel Jones sprained his neck in the contest and was officially ruled out on December 3. Backup QB Mike Glennon would get his first start with the Giants.

The story in the first half was about field position. After the Giants were pinned deep and moved the ball to midfield, Glennon was intercepted by Xavien Howard who was touched down at the 3-yard line. A Dolphins three-and-out put the Giants in good field position for their next drive, and kicked a field goal to open the scoring. The Dolphins responded with a field goal of their own, and later capped off a 12-play, 89-yard drive to take a 10–3 halftime lead.

The Giants kicked a field goal on their opening drive of the second half to make it 10–6, and there were 2 combined first down over the next 6 drives for both teams. Near the end of the third quarter after taking a sack, Joe Judge called timeout on 2nd and 23. Glennon was sacked on the following play and followed by a delay of game. This sequence deflated the Giants, who gave the ball back to the Dolphins in advantageous field position and scored to make it 17–6. The Dolphins missed a field goal to ice the game and gave the ball back to the Giants, who made it a one-score game again. The defense couldn't get any stops nor could the coaches keep stopping the clock, so the Dolphins kicked one last field goal and defeated the Giants 20–9, winning their fifth game in a row and reviving their playoff hopes.

The Dolphins became the second team to ever win 5 games in a row after a 7-game losing streak (the first being the 1994 Giants). They snapped a 4-game losing streak against the Giants, defeating them for the first time since 2003, also their first time beating them in Miami. Dolphins wide receiver Jaylen Waddle broke Jarvis Landry's franchise record with most catches in a season by a rookie (finished with 84 in 2014) with his 9-catch, 90-yard performance. The Giants fell to 4–8 on the season and backup quarterback Mike Glennon suffered a concussion in the loss.

==== Week 14: at Los Angeles Chargers ====
Week 14: New York Giants at Los Angeles Chargers – Game summary

Quarter	1	2	3	4	Total
Giants	7	0	0	14	**21**
**Chargers**	7	17	6	7	**37**

at SoFi Stadium, Inglewood, California

- Date: December 12
- Game time: 4:05 p.m. EST/1:05 p.m. PST
- Game weather: None (retractable roof closed)
- Game attendance: 70,240
- Referee: Tony Corrente
- TV announcers (Fox): Adam Amin, Mark Schlereth and Shannon Spake
- Recap, Game Book

Game information

**First quarter**

- LAC – Austin Ekeler 4-yard run (Dustin Hopkins kick), 4:44. Chargers 7–0. **Drive: 9 plays, 60 yards, 4:33.**
- NYG – Elijhaa Penny 3-yard pass from Mike Glennon (Graham Gano kick), 1:29. Tied 7–7. **Drive: 7 plays, 75 yards, 3:15.**

**Second quarter**

- LAC – Josh Palmer 12-yard pass from Justin Herbert (Dustin Hopkins kick), 12:07. Chargers 14–7. **Drive: 9 plays, 60 yards, 4:22.**
- LAC – Dustin Hopkins 27-yard field goal, 4:15. Chargers 17–7. **Drive: 12 plays, 69 yards, 6:25.**
- LAC – Jalen Guyton 45-yard pass from Justin Herbert (Dustin Hopkins kick), 0:17. Chargers 24–7. **Drive: 4 plays, 75 yards, 0:23.**

**Third quarter**

- LAC – Dustin Hopkins 28-yard field goal, 9:36. Chargers 27–7. **Drive: 10 plays, 67 yards, 5:24.**
- LAC – Dustin Hopkins 39-yard field goal, 5:05. Chargers 30–7. **Drive: 6 plays, 17 yards, 2:56.**

**Fourth quarter**

- LAC – Jared Cook 1-yard pass from Justin Herbert (Dustin Hopkins kick), 9:28. Chargers 37–7. **Drive: 11 plays, 41 yards, 5:55.**
- NYG – Saquon Barkley 18-yard pass from Mike Glennon (pass failed), 4:33. Chargers 37–13. **Drive: 10 plays, 75 yards, 4:55.**
- NYG – Mike Glennon 7-yard run (Elijhaa Penny run), 1:18. Chargers 37–21. **Drive: 7 plays, 63 yards, 2:11.**

**Top passers**

- NYG – Mike Glennon – 17/36, 191 yards, 2 TD, INT
- LAC – Justin Herbert – 23/31, 275 yards, 3 TD

**Top rushers**

- NYG – Saquon Barkley – 16 rushes, 64 yards
- LAC – Austin Ekeler – 12 rushes, 67 yards, TD

**Top receivers**

- NYG – Kyle Rudolph – 2 receptions, 66 yards
- LAC – Jalen Guyton – 3 receptions, 87 yards, TD

The injury-ridden 4–9 Giants played against a 7–5 Chargers team in a must-win situation and were blown out. Kyle Rudolph had a career-long 66-yard reception which Elijhaa Penny capped off with his first career touchdown reception, tying the game at 7–7 late in the first quarter. The Chargers scored 17 points on 4 possessions in the second quarter, including a 59-yard touchdown pass from Justin Herbert to Jalen Guyton. The Giants only gained 29 total yards in the 3rd quarter and were down 37–7 before scoring two touchdowns late in the game. Saquon Barkley scored his first touchdown since Week 4, and Mike Glennon had his first career rushing touchdown.

==== Week 15: vs. Dallas Cowboys ====
Week 15: Dallas Cowboys at New York Giants – Game summary

Quarter	1	2	3	4	Total
**Cowboys**	6	9	6	0	**21**
Giants	3	0	3	0	**6**

at MetLife Stadium, East Rutherford, New Jersey

- Date: December 19
- Game time: 1:00 p.m. EST
- Game weather: Cloudy, 40 °F (4 °C)
- Game attendance: 77,413
- Referee: Jerome Boger
- TV announcers (Fox): Adam Amin, Mark Schlereth and Shannon Spake
- Recap, Game Book

Game information

**First quarter**

- DAL – Ezekiel Elliott 13-yard run (kick failed), 6:31. Cowboys 6–0. **Drive: 2 plays, 13 yards, 0:09.**
- NYG – Graham Gano 35-yard field goal, 0:37. Cowboys 6–3. **Drive: 11 plays, 58 yards, 5:54.**

**Second quarter**

- DAL – Greg Zuerlein 26-yard field goal, 10:30. Cowboys 9–3. **Drive: 10 plays, 58 yards, 5:07.**
- DAL – Greg Zuerlein 42-yard field goal, 1:39. Cowboys 12–3. **Drive: 16 plays, 68 yards, 6:37.**
- DAL – Greg Zuerlein 27-yard field goal, 0:00. Cowboys 15–3. **Drive: 6 plays, 37 yards, 0:41.**

**Third quarter**

- NYG – Graham Gano 42-yard field goal, 12:05. Cowboys 15–6. **Drive: 8 plays, 51 yards, 2:55.**
- DAL – Dalton Schultz 1-yard pass from Dak Prescott (kick failed), 1:57. Cowboys 21–6. **Drive: 5 plays, 29 yards, 2:28.**

**Fourth quarter**

- No scoring plays.

**Top passers**

- DAL – Dak Prescott – 28/37, 217 yards, TD
- NYG – Mike Glennon – 13/24, 99 yards, 3 INT

**Top rushers**

- DAL – Tony Pollard – 12 rushes, 74 yards
- NYG – Devontae Booker – 8 rushes, 74 yards

**Top receivers**

- DAL – Dalton Schultz – 8 receptions, 67 yards, TD
- NYG – Kenny Golladay – 3 receptions, 53 yards

The Giants offense was listless for the fifth game in a row. After forcing a Cowboys punt to start the game, Mike Glennon was intercepted on the Giants first drive, which Ezekiel Elliott capped off with a 13-yard touchdown run. Greg Zuerlein made up for the missed extra point by scoring field goals on the next 3 Cowboys possessions to close out the first half and give the Cowboys a 15–3 halftime lead. The last of which was caused by the defense forcing a Saquon Barkley fumble, his first in the NFL.

The Giants converted a 4th and 1 play with a 31-yard run by Devontae Booker, which set up another field goal to make it 15–6. On the next drive with 4th and inches on their own 29, Glennon was stuffed on a quarterback sneak. Cowboys quarterback Dak Prescott threw a touchdown pass to Dalton Schultz 5 plays later, but Zuerlein missed his second extra point of the game. Glennon was intercepted on the next drive, and after a series of punts, Lorenzo Carter strip-sacked Prescott to give the Giants the ball on the Cowboys 27 with 8:32 to play. Two plays later, Glennon threw a deep ball to the end zone which was intercepted by Trevon Diggs for his 10th of the season. The Cowboys burned the clock and punted to the Giants, who benched Glennon for Jake Fromm, a rookie quarterback from Georgia making his NFL debut after being on the Buffalo Bills practice squad just two weeks prior. Despite driving the Giants down the field, Fromm turned the ball over on downs, sealing the Cowboys' 21–6 victory.

The Giants fell to 4–10 and had their 5th season in a row of 10+ losses, and were swept by the Cowboys for the 4th time in 5 years, and the 6th time in 9 years. The Cowboys improved to 10–4 but failed to clinch a playoff spot when the 49ers and Saints both won later that day.

The next day, the Giants announced they were shutting down starting quarterback Daniel Jones for the last three games of the season.

==== Week 16: at Philadelphia Eagles ====
Week 16: New York Giants at Philadelphia Eagles – Game summary

Quarter	1	2	3	4	Total
Giants	0	3	0	7	**10**
**Eagles**	0	3	17	14	**34**

at Lincoln Financial Field, Philadelphia, Pennsylvania

- Date: December 26
- Game time: 1:00 p.m. EST
- Game weather: Clear, 50 °F (10 °C)
- Game attendance: 69,796
- Referee: Land Clark
- TV announcers (Fox): Kenny Albert, Jonathan Vilma and Sara Walsh
- Recap, Game Book

Game information

**First quarter**

- No scoring plays.

**Second quarter**

- NYG – Graham Gano 54-yard field goal, 11:41. Giants 3–0. **Drive: 11 plays, 39 yards, 4:43.**
- PHI - Jake Elliott 22-yard field goal, 1:57. Tied 3–3. **Drive: 7 plays, 56 yards, 2:53.**

**Third quarter**

- PHI - Boston Scott 3-yard run (Elliott kick), 12:02. Eagles 10–3. **Drive: 5 plays, 21 yards, 2:08.**
- PHI - Jake Elliott 37-yard field goal, 7:48. Eagles 13–3. **Drive: 4 plays, 2 yards, 1:59.**
- PHI - DeVonta Smith 4-yard pass from Jalen Hurts (Elliott kick), 4:07. Eagles 20–3. **Drive: 5 plays, 57 yards, 2:46.**

**Fourth quarter**

- PHI - Lane Johnson 5-yard pass from Jalen Hurts (Elliott kick), 11:40. Eagles 27–3. **Drive: 10 plays, 75 yards, 5:26.**
- PHI - Alex Singleton 29-yard interception return (Elliott kick), 10:19. Eagles 34–3. **Drive: 3 plays, 6 yards, 1:21.**
- NYG - Evan Engram 9-yard pass from Mike Glennon (Gano kick), 3:50. Eagles 34–10. **Drive: 17 plays, 75 yards, 6:29.**

**Top passers**

- NYG - Mike Glennon - 17/27, 93 yards, 1 TD, 1 INT
- PHI - Jalen Hurts - 17/29, 199 yards, 2 TD

**Top rushers**

- NYG - Saquon Barkley - 15 carries, 32 yards
- PHI - Miles Sanders - 7 carries, 45 yards

**Top receivers**

- NYG - Kadarius Toney - 4 receptions, 28 yards
- PHI - DeVonta Smith - 5 receptions, 80 yards, 1 TD

Jake Fromm made his first career NFL start as the Giants visited the Eagles seeking to even their all-time series and complete their first season sweep of Philadelphia since the 2007 season.

While New York got off to a sluggish start on offense in the first half, only scoring a Graham Gano field goal, the defense would pick up the slack, limiting Philadelphia to a field goal of their own. However, miscues on both sides of the ball for the Giants in the second half would lead to the Eagles blowing the game wide open. Fromm completed 6 of 17 passes for 25 yards and an interception before being benched in the third quarter for Mike Glennon. Glennon would finish 17 of 27 for 93 yards, a garbage-time touchdown to Evan Engram, and a pick-six by Alex Singleton. Lane Johnson had his first career touchdown for the Eagles late in the game.

With the loss, New York failed to improve on their 6–10 record from the year before, and was eliminated from playoff contention for the 5th straight year. This was New York's eighth straight road loss to Philadelphia dating back to the 2014 season, as well as their 90th overall loss to their rivals.

==== Week 17: at Chicago Bears ====
Week 17: New York Giants at Chicago Bears – Game summary

Quarter	1	2	3	4	Total
Giants	0	3	0	0	**3**
**Bears**	14	8	7	0	**29**

at Soldier Field, Chicago, Illinois

- Date: January 2
- Game time: 1:00 p.m. EST/12:00 p.m. CST
- Game weather: Partly cloudy, 24 °F (−4 °C)
- Game attendance: 59,594
- Referee: Shawn Hochuli
- TV announcers (CBS): Spero Dedes and Jay Feely
- Recap, Game Book

Game information

**First quarter**

- CHI – David Montgomery 2-yard run (Cairo Santos kick), 11:42. Bears 7–0. **Drive: 1 play, 2 yards, 0:03.**
- CHI – Darnell Mooney 4-yard pass from Andy Dalton (Cairo Santos kick), 8:08. Bears 14–0. **Drive: 7 plays, 24 yards, 3:39.**

**Second quarter**

- NYG – Graham Gano 38-yard field goal, 7:45. Bears 14–3. **Drive: 10 plays, 35 yards, 6:02.**
- CHI – Cairo Santos 21-yard field goal, 1:01. Bears 17–3. **Drive: 14 plays, 69 yards, 6:44.**
- CHI – Devontae Booker tackled in end zone by Angelo Blackson for a safety, 0:52. Bears 19–3.
- CHI – Cairo Santos 44-yard field goal, 0:00. Bears 22–3. **Drive: 7 plays, 39 yards, 0:52.**

**Third quarter**

- CHI – David Montgomery 2-yard run (Cairo Santos kick), 9:30. Bears 29–3. **Drive: 11 plays, 75 yards, 5:30.**

**Fourth quarter**

- No scoring plays.

**Top passers**

- NYG – Mike Glennon – 4/11, 24 yards, 2 INT
- CHI – Andy Dalton – 18/35, 173 yards, TD, INT

**Top rushers**

- NYG – Saquon Barkley – 21 rushes, 102 yards
- CHI – David Montgomery – 22 rushes, 64 yards, 2 TD

**Top receivers**

- NYG – Evan Engram – 1 reception, 12 yards
- CHI – Darnell Mooney – 7 receptions, 61 yards, TD

Saquon Barkley had his first 100 rushing yard game since his ACL injury (also in Chicago), but the Giants fell to 4-12 and finished the game with -10 net passing yards, the worst by an NFL team since 1998. They also became the first team since 2009 to end a game with negative passing yards.

Robert Quinn set the Bears franchise record with his 18th sack of the season, passing Hall of Famer Richard Dent, and David Montgomery tacked on two rushing touchdowns for the Bears.

==== Week 18: vs. Washington Football Team ====
Week 18: Washington Football Team at New York Giants – Game summary

Quarter	1	2	3	4	Total
**Washington**	3	3	6	10	**22**
Giants	0	0	0	7	**7**

at MetLife Stadium, East Rutherford, New Jersey

- Date: January 9
- Game time: 1:00 p.m. EST
- Game weather: Light rain, 36 °F (2 °C)
- Game attendance: 69,923
- Referee: Adrian Hill
- TV announcers (Fox): Chris Myers, Daryl Johnston and Jen Hale
- Recap, Game Book

Game information

**First quarter**

- WAS – Joey Slye 23-yard field goal, 9:03. Football Team 3–0. **Drive: 11 plays, 76 yards, 5:57.**

**Second quarter**

- WAS – Joey Slye 43-yard field goal, 0:00. Football Team 6–0. **Drive: 5 plays, 44 yards, 1:34.**

**Third quarter**

- WAS – Bobby McCain 30-yard interception return (pass failed), 3:41. Football Team 12–0.

**Fourth quarter**

- NYG – Darius Slayton 22-yard pass from Jake Fromm (Graham Gano kick), 11:24. Football Team 12–7. **Drive: 14 plays, 69 yards, 7:17.**
- WAS – Antonio Gibson 18-yard run (Joey Slye kick), 6:28. Football Team 19–7. **Drive: 8 plays, 72 yards, 4:56.**
- WAS – Joey Slye 23-yard field goal, 4:40. Football Team 22–7. **Drive: 4 plays, 7 yards, 1:40.**

**Top passers**

- WAS – Taylor Heinicke – 9/18, 120 yards
- NYG – Jake Fromm – 15/31, 103 yards, TD, 2 INT

**Top rushers**

- WAS – Antonio Gibson – 21 rushes, 146 yards, TD
- NYG – Jake Fromm – 5 rushes, 53 yards

**Top receivers**

- WAS – Terry McLaurin – 4 receptions, 93 yards
- NYG – Darius Slayton – 2 receptions, 29 yards, TD

In a near empty MetLife Stadium, the Giants offense only had 78 total yards through the first three quarters, including quarterback sneaks on back-to-back plays—2nd and 11 on the Giants' 2, 3rd and 9 on the Giants' 4—in the second quarter, to the chagrin of the fans in attendance. Washington had a 12–0 lead going into the fourth quarter after two first half field goals and a Bobby McCain pick six. Jake Fromm threw his first career touchdown pass to Darius Slayton for the Giants, then Antonio Gibson scored a touchdown for Washington. After a Fromm fumble, Joey Slye kicked his third field goal of the game to close out the 2021 season for both teams.

With the loss, the Giants finished the season 4–13 on a 6-game losing streak, all by double digits, the first such occurrence in franchise history. This was the second time in franchise history the Giants lost 13 games, and the first time the Giants had been swept by Washington since 2011. Joe Judge became the first Giants head coach to lose 13 games in a season. (Ben McAdoo only lost 10 games in 2017, as he was fired before the end of the season.)

The Giants recorded just 5 receiving touchdowns by wide receivers all season. Free agent signee Kenny Golladay and first round pick Kadarius Toney both failed to record a touchdown. Slayton's touchdown was the first by a Giants wide receiver since Dante Pettis in Week 7.

The Giants secured the 5th and 7th picks in the 2022 NFL draft, the latter by virtue of the Chicago Bears in the Justin Fields trade.

The following day, the Giants announced Dave Gettleman's retirement as General Manager after a 19–46 record over four seasons, and that Judge would remain as head coach in 2022. However, the team went back on that promise and fired Judge the following day, finishing with a 10–23 record.

Notably, this was the last game the Washington Football Team played with their temporary moniker, rebranding as the Commanders ahead the 2022 season after changing their name in 2020.

=== Standings ===
==== Division ====
NFC East
	W	L	T	PCT	DIV	CONF	PF	PA	STK
^{(3)} Dallas Cowboys	12	5	0	.706	6–0	10–2	530	358	W1
^{(7)} Philadelphia Eagles	9	8	0	.529	3–3	7–5	444	385	L1
Washington Football Team	7	10	0	.412	2–4	6–6	335	434	W1
New York Giants	4	13	0	.235	1–5	3–9	258	416	L6

==== Conference ====
NFC
#	Team	Division	W	L	T	PCT	DIV	CONF	SOS	SOV	STK
**Division winners**
1 (Note: Green Bay finished ahead of Tampa Bay based on conference record (9–3 vs. 8–4), claiming the No. 1 seed.)	Green Bay Packers	North	13	4	0	.765	4–2	9–3	.479	.480	L1
2	Tampa Bay Buccaneers	South	13	4	0	.765	4–2	8–4	.467	.443	W3
3 (Note: Dallas claimed the No. 3 seed over LA Rams based on conference record (10–2 vs. 8–4).)	Dallas Cowboys	East	12	5	0	.706	6–0	10–2	.488	.431	W1
4	Los Angeles Rams	West	12	5	0	.706	3–3	8–4	.483	.409	L1
**Wild cards**
5	Arizona Cardinals	West	11	6	0	.647	4–2	7–5	.490	.492	L1
6	San Francisco 49ers	West	10	7	0	.588	2–4	7–5	.500	.438	W2
7 (Note: Philadelphia finished ahead of New Orleans based on head-to-head victory, claiming the 7th and final playoff spot.)	Philadelphia Eagles	East	9	8	0	.529	3–3	7–5	.469	.350	L1
**Did not qualify for the postseason**
8	New Orleans Saints	South	9	8	0	.529	4–2	7–5	.512	.516	W2
9	Minnesota Vikings	North	8	9	0	.471	4–2	6–6	.507	.434	W1
10 (Note: Washington finished ahead of Atlanta and Seattle based on head-to-head victories.)	Washington Football Team	East	7	10	0	.412	2–4	6–6	.529	.420	W1
11 (Note: Seattle finished ahead of Atlanta based on win percentage in common games (4–2 vs. 3–3 against: San Francisco, New Orleans, Jacksonville, Washington, and Detroit).)	Seattle Seahawks	West	7	10	0	.412	3–3	4–8	.519	.424	W2
12	Atlanta Falcons	South	7	10	0	.412	2–4	4–8	.472	.315	L2
13	Chicago Bears	North	6	11	0	.353	2–4	4–8	.524	.373	L1
14	Carolina Panthers	South	5	12	0	.294	2–4	3–9	.509	.412	L7
15	New York Giants	East	4	13	0	.235	1–5	3–9	.536	.485	L6
16	Detroit Lions	North	3	13	1	.206	2–4	3–9	.528	.627	W1
**Tiebreakers** (Note: When breaking ties for three or more teams under the NFL's rules, they are first broken within divisions, then comparing only the highest-ranked remaining team from each division.)

== Regular season statistical leaders ==
	Player(s)	Value	NFL Rank	NFC Rank
Passing yards	Daniel Jones	2,428 Yards	29th	14th
Passing touchdowns	Daniel Jones	10 TDs	30th	14th
Rushing yards	Saquon Barkley & Devontae Booker	593 Yards	T-35th	T-19th
Rushing touchdowns	Saquon Barkley, Devontae Booker & Daniel Jones	2 TDs	T-60th	T-30th
Receptions	Evan Engram	46 Receptions	T-80th	T-39th
Receiving yards	Kenny Golladay	521 Yards	76th	36th
Receiving touchdowns	Evan Engram	3 TDs	T-75th	T-40th
Points	Graham Gano	104 Points	23th	11th
Kickoff Return Yards	C. J. Board	273 Yards	31st	15th
Punt return Yards	Pharoh Cooper	90 Yards	35th	17th
Tackles	Tae Crowder	130 Tackles	T-15th	T-11th
Sacks	Azeez Ojulari	8.0 Sacks	T-32th	T-17th
Interceptions	Xavier McKinney	5 INTs	T-4th	T-3rd
