= Tae Crowder =

American football player (born 1997)

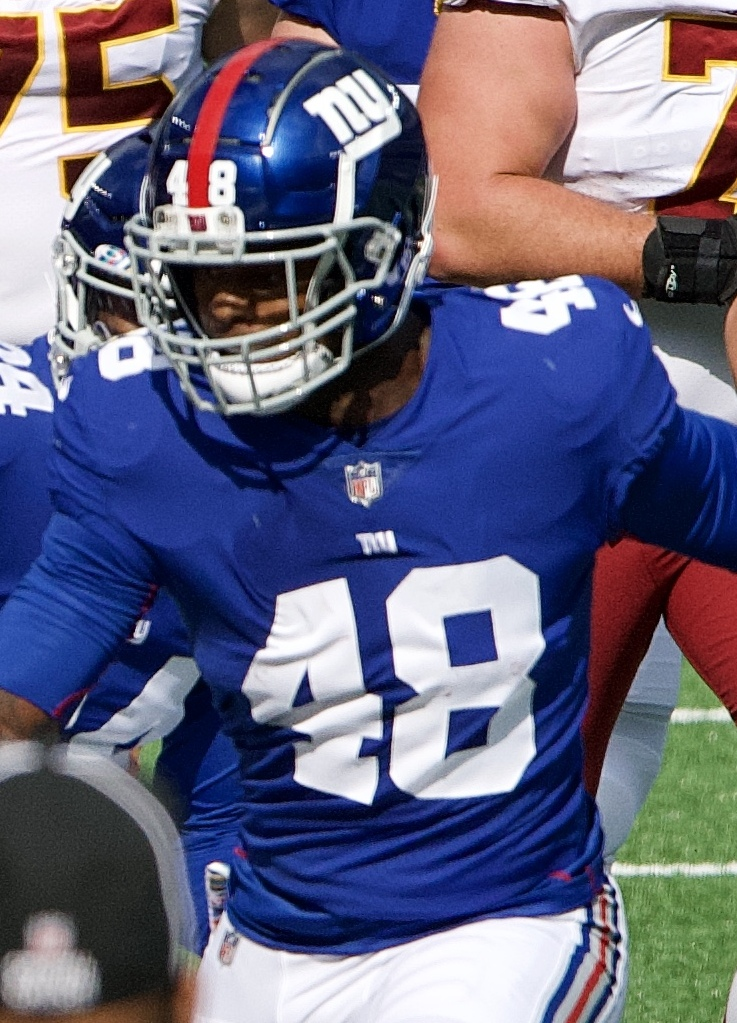
- Crowder with the New York Giants in 2020

No. 20 – Rhode Island Breakers
- Position: Linebacker
- Roster status: Active

Personal information
- Born: March 12, 1997 (age 29); Pine Mountain, Georgia, U.S.
- Listed height: 6 ft 1 in (1.85 m)
- Listed weight: 236 lb (107 kg)

Career information
- High school: Harris County (Hamilton, Georgia)
- College: Georgia (2015–2019)
- NFL draft: 2020: 7th round, 255th overall pick

Career history
- New York Giants (2020–2022); Pittsburgh Steelers (2022); Los Angeles Chargers (2023)*; Tennessee Titans (2023); Birmingham Stallions (2025–2026); Rhode Island Breakers (2027–present)
- * Offseason or practice squad member only

Awards and highlights
- All-UFL Team (2026); UFL tackles leader (2026)

Career NFL statistics
- Total tackles: 232
- Sacks: 2.0
- Pass deflections: 8
- Interceptions: 2
- Forced fumbles: 2
- Fumble recoveries: 1
- Defensive touchdowns: 1
- Stats at Pro Football Reference

Dequartavous "Tae" Crowder (born March 12, 1997) is an American professional football linebacker for the Rhode Island Breakers of the United Football League (UFL). He played college football at Georgia. He was selected by the New York Giants with the final pick in the 2020 NFL draft, making him that draft's Mr. Irrelevant.

== College career ==
Crowder redshirted his freshman season at Georgia in 2015. He switched to inside linebacker from running back in 2016. Crowder performed an important special teams role in 2017, helping the Bulldogs reach the national championship game before falling to Alabama. Between 2018 and 2019 Crowder recorded 48 tackles including 4.5 for a loss. He was one of the 12 finalists for the Butkus Award. Crowder made a career-high 12 tackles in a loss to South Carolina. In his career, Crowder produced 115 tackles, 10 tackles for loss, five passes defensed, and 1.5 sacks.

== Professional career ==
Pre-draft measurables
Height	Weight
6 ft 1 7/8 in (1.88 m)	241 lb (109 kg)
Values from Pro Day

=== New York Giants ===
==== 2020 ====
Crowder was selected by the New York Giants with the 255th and final pick of the 2020 NFL draft, thus becoming Mr. Irrelevant of the 2020 season. He was reunited with his former inside linebackers coach at Georgia Kevin Sherrer when he was drafted by the Giants. Crowder was placed on the active/non-football injury list by the Giants at the start of training camp on July 28, 2020. He was activated on August 9. Crowder was inactive for week 1 due to a hamstring injury. In Week 6 against the Washington Football Team, Crowder recovered a fumble forced by teammate Kyler Fackrell on Kyle Allen and returned it for a 43 yard touchdown during the 20–19 win. Crowder was placed on injured reserve with a hamstring injury on October 20, 2020. He was activated on November 28, 2020. In Week 13 against the Seattle Seahawks, Crowder recorded his first career sack on Russell Wilson during the 17–12 win, this helped his career in the NFL.

==== 2021 ====
In Week 12, against the Philadelphia Eagles, Crowder recorded his first interception on Jalen Hurts during the 13–7 victory. While starting all 17 games, Crowder ended the season with a career-high 130 tackles and led the team in tackles; he also recorded 2 interceptions and 1 forced fumble.

==== 2022 ====
After the release of Blake Martinez one week before the season started; Crowder was left as the best option at linebacker in the depth chart. In the season opener against the Tennessee Titans, Crowder recorded 7 tackles; one of them being a big hit on running back Derrick Henry. In Week 10 against the Houston Texans the Giants decided to bench Crowder and move Jaylon Smith to inside linebacker and moved Micah McFadden to outside linebacker. On December 20, 2022, he was waived. He started the first eight games of the 2022 season and departed the main roster with 43 tackles, 1 sack, and one forced fumble. He was re-signed to the practice squad two days later.

=== Pittsburgh Steelers ===
On December 27, 2022, Crowder was signed by the Pittsburgh Steelers to their active roster. He was released on May 22, 2023.

=== Los Angeles Chargers ===
On August 22, 2023, Crowder signed with the Los Angeles Chargers. He was waived as part of final roster cuts seven days later.

=== Tennessee Titans ===
On December 26, 2023, Crowder was signed to the Titans practice squad. He was not signed to a reserve/future contract and thus became a free agent when his contract expired at the end of the season.

=== Birmingham Stallions ===
On January 17, 2025, Crowder signed with the Birmingham Stallions of the United Football League (UFL).

== Career statistics ==
Regular season statistics
Year	Team	Games		Tackles				Fumbles				Interceptions					
Year	Team	GP	GS	Comb	Solo	Ast	Sack	FF	FR	Yds	TD	PD	INT	Yds	Avg	Lng	TD
2020	NYG	11	6	57	34	23	1.0	0	1	43	1	1	0	0	0.0	0	0
2021	NYG	17	17	130	64	66	0	1	0	0	0	6	2	26	13.0	1	0
2022	NYG	13	8	45	26	19	1.0	1	0	0	0	1	0	0	0.0	0	0
2022	PIT	0	0	0	0	0	0	0	0	0	0	0	0	0	0.0	0	0
2023	TEN	2	0	0	0	0	0	0	0	0	0	0	0	0	0.0	0	0
Career		43	31	232	124	108	2.0	2	1	43	1	8	2	26	13.0	1	0
