= Elijhaa Penny =

American football player (born 1993)

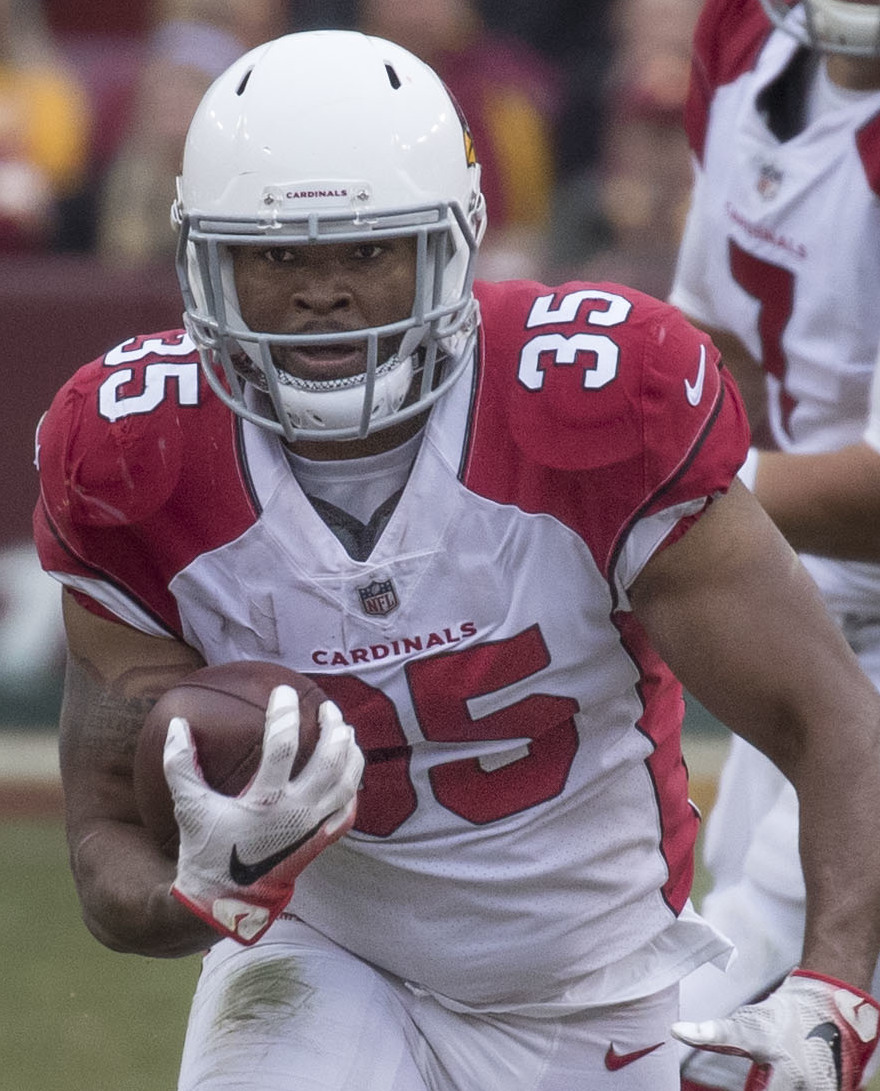
- Penny with the Arizona Cardinals in 2017

No. 35, 39
- Position: Fullback

Personal information
- Born: August 17, 1993 (age 33); Los Angeles, California, U.S.
- Listed height: 6 ft 1 in (1.85 m)
- Listed weight: 250 lb (113 kg)

Career information
- High school: Norwalk (Norwalk, California)
- College: Idaho (2014–2015)
- NFL draft: 2016: undrafted

Career history
- Arizona Cardinals (2016–2018); New York Giants (2018–2021)

Career NFL statistics
- Rushing attempts: 83
- Rushing yards: 302
- Rushing touchdowns: 3
- Receptions: 25
- Receiving yards: 147
- Receiving touchdowns: 1
- Stats at Pro Football Reference

Elijhaa Penny (born August 17, 1993) is an American former professional football player who was a fullback in the National Football League (NFL). He was signed by the Arizona Cardinals after going undrafted in the 2016 NFL draft. He played college football for the Idaho Vandals after attending Cerritos College. He has also played for the New York Giants.

== Early life ==
Penny attended and played high school football at Norwalk High School in Norwalk, California. He ran for 1,338 yards on 199 carries and scored a school single-season record 20 touchdowns as a sophomore.

== College career ==
Penny initially began his college career at College of the Sequoias in Visalia, California, appearing in eight games and totaling 102 yards and two touchdowns on 22 carries.

Penny played in 23 games (14 starts) in two seasons at Idaho after transferring from Cerritos College. He totaled 1,748 rushing yards and 22 touchdowns on 385 carries with the Vandals while adding 39 receptions for 346 yards and three touchdowns and returning 15 kickoffs for 278 yards. He started all 12 games as a senior, leading the team with 1,159 rushing yards and 10 touchdowns on 246 attempts and catching 27 passes for 239 yards and two touchdowns. In Penny's first season at Idaho in 2014, played 11 games (two starts) and led the team with 589 rushing yards and 12 touchdowns on 139 carries. The 12 rushing touchdowns were the most by a Vandals player since DeMaundray Woolridge had 18 in 2009. In addition, he had 12 catches for 107 yards and a touchdown. He majored in general studies at Idaho.

== Professional career ==
Pre-draft measurables
Height	Weight	Arm length	Hand span	40-yard dash	10-yard split	20-yard split	20-yard shuttle	Three-cone drill	Vertical jump	Broad jump	Bench press
6 ft 0 7/8 in (1.85 m)	244 lb (111 kg)	30 1/4 in (0.77 m)	9 1/8 in (0.23 m)	4.81 s	1.72 s	2.75 s	4.55 s	7.20 s	28.5 in (0.72 m)	9 ft 0 in (2.74 m)	21 reps
All values from Pro Day

=== Arizona Cardinals ===
Penny was signed by the Arizona Cardinals as an undrafted free agent on May 9, 2016. He was waived on September 3, 2016, and was signed to the practice squad the next day. He signed a reserve/future contract on January 3, 2017, after spending his entire rookie season on the practice squad. In Week 4, against the San Francisco 49ers, Penny had his first career carry, a one-yard rush, in the 18–15 victory. On December 3, against the Los Angeles Rams, he had his first professional touchdown in the 32–16 loss. Overall, he finished the 2017 season with 31 carries for 124 yards and two rushing touchdowns to go along with four receptions for 38 yards.

On September 1, 2018, Penny was waived by the Cardinals and was signed to the practice squad the next day.

=== New York Giants ===
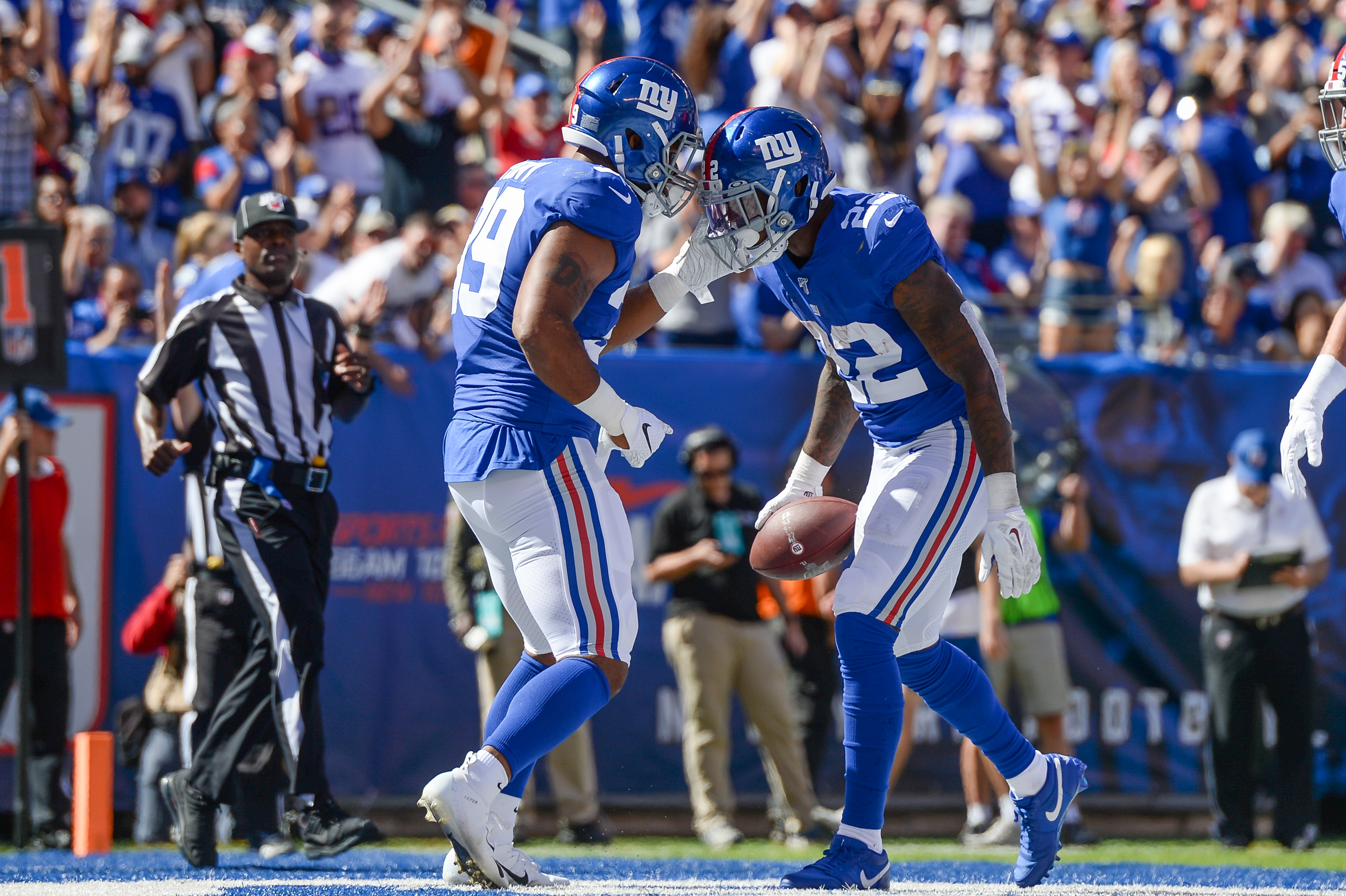
Penny in a game against the Washington Redskins

=== 2018 ===
On September 19, 2018, Penny was signed by the New York Giants off the Cardinals' practice squad. In the 2018 season, Penny finished with eight receptions for 50 receiving yards to go along with seven carries for 25 rushing yards in 14 games and three starts. Penny became the Giants' main fullback and also contributed to their special teams units.

=== 2019 ===
On March 12, 2019, Penny re-signed with the Giants. In the 2019 season, Penny finished with 15 carries for 39 rushing yards in 16 games and one start.

=== 2020 ===
On March 12, 2020, Penny signed a two-year contract extension with the Giants. On January 2, 2021, Penny was placed on injured reserve. Penny appeared in 14 games and had six carries for 15 yards along with 2 receptions for 20 yards.

=== 2021 ===
Due to multiple injuries at running back, Penny would be used as a hybrid fullback and running back in the 2021 season. On October 17, 2021, Penny recorded his first rushing touchdown for the New York Giants against the Los Angeles Rams in a 38–11 loss. In Week 14, against the Los Angeles Chargers, he had a receiving touchdown. In the 2021 season, he appeared in all 17 games and started three.

On November 28, 2022, Penny announced his retirement from the NFL.

== Coaching career ==
On March 26, 2023, Penny got the head coaching position at John Glenn High School in Norwalk, California.

== NFL career statistics ==
Year	Team	Games		Rushing				Receiving				
Year	Team	GP	GS	Att	Yds	Avg	TD	Rec	Yds	Avg	Lng	TD
2017	AZ	16	0	31	124	4	2	4	38	9.5	18	0
2018	NYG	14	3	7	25	3.6	0	8	50	6.3	16	0
2019	NYG	16	1	15	39	2.6	0	2	9	4.5	9	0
2020	NYG	14	0	6	15	2.5	0	2	20	10	11	0
2021	NYG	17	3	24	99	4.1	1	9	30	3.3	16	1
Total		69	6	81	292	3.6	3	20	126	6.5	18	1

== Personal life ==
Elijhaa Penny is the older brother of retired NFL running back Rashaad Penny.
