= C. J. Board =

American football player (born 1993)

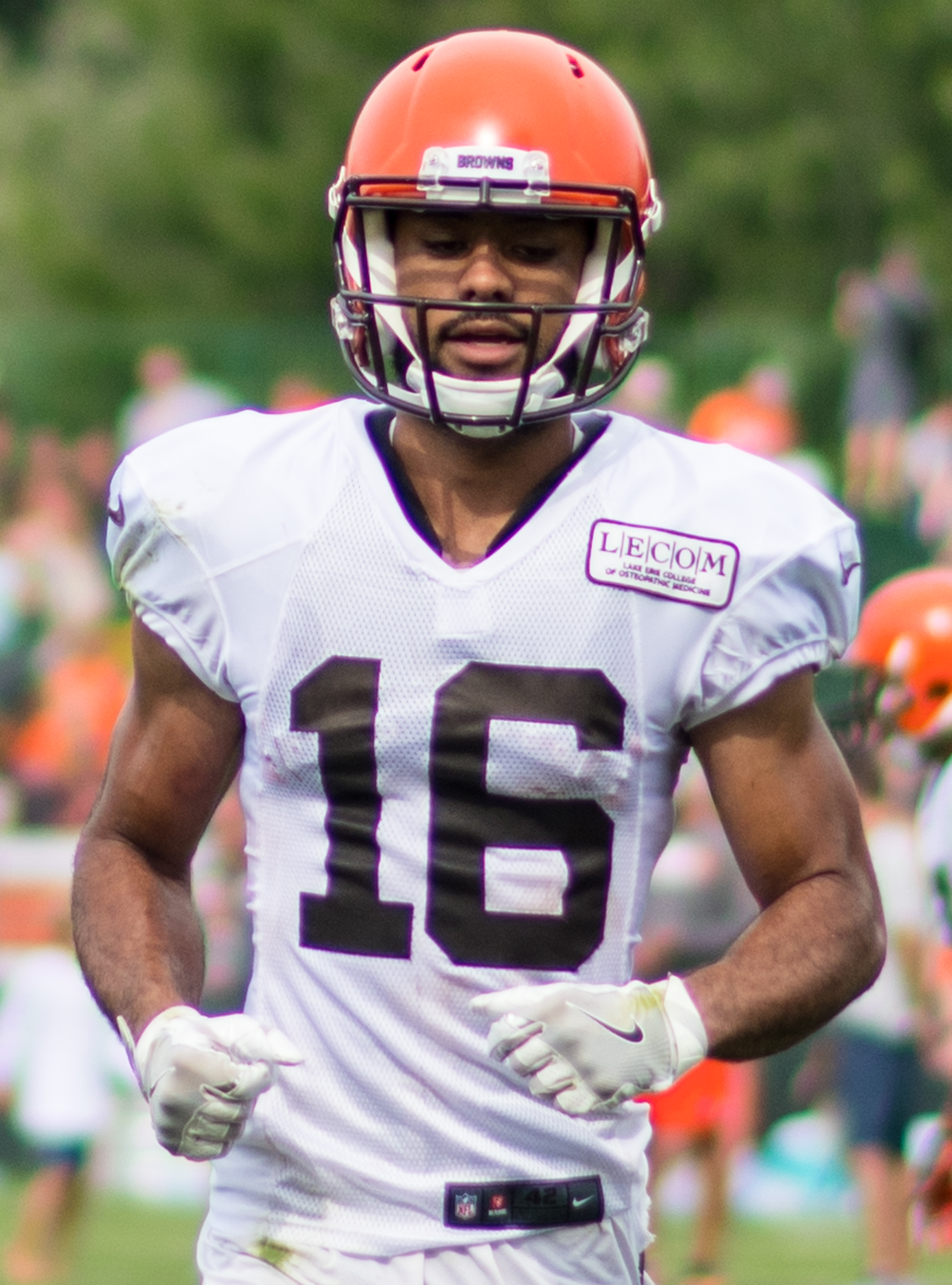
- Board with the Cleveland Browns in 2018

No. 16, 18, 80
- Position: Wide receiver

Personal information
- Born: December 12, 1993 (age 32); Clarksville, Tennessee, U.S.
- Listed height: 6 ft 1 in (1.85 m)
- Listed weight: 181 lb (82 kg)

Career information
- High school: West Creek (Clarksville)
- College: Chattanooga
- NFL draft: 2017: undrafted

Career history
- Baltimore Ravens (2017)*; Tennessee Titans (2017)*; Cleveland Browns (2017–2018); Jacksonville Jaguars (2018–2019); New York Giants (2020–2022); Arizona Cardinals (2022)*; Tennessee Titans (2022)
- * Offseason or practice squad member only

Career NFL statistics
- Receptions: 18
- Receiving yards: 189
- Return yards: 595
- Stats at Pro Football Reference

Clarence "C. J." Board (born December 12, 1993) is an American former professional football player who was a wide receiver in the National Football League (NFL). He played college football for the Chattanooga Mocs.

== Professional career ==
Pre-draft measurables
Height	Weight	Arm length	Hand span	40-yard dash	10-yard split	20-yard split	20-yard shuttle	Three-cone drill	Vertical jump	Broad jump	Bench press
6 ft 0 5/8 in (1.84 m)	181 lb (82 kg)	31 1/2 in (0.80 m)	9 1/4 in (0.23 m)	4.42 s	1.51 s	2.53 s	4.06 s	6.67 s	38.5 in (0.98 m)	11 ft 0 in (3.35 m)	9 reps
All values from Pro Day

=== Baltimore Ravens ===
Board signed with the Baltimore Ravens as an undrafted free agent on May 4, 2017. He was waived by the Ravens on September 1, 2017.

=== Tennessee Titans (first stint) ===
On October 4, 2017, Board was signed to the Tennessee Titans' practice squad. He was released on November 28, 2017.

=== Cleveland Browns ===
On December 26, 2017, Board was signed to the Cleveland Browns' practice squad. He signed a future/reserve contract with the Browns on January 1, 2018.

On August 31, 2018, Board was waived/injured by the Browns and was placed on injured reserve. He was released on September 11, 2018.

=== Jacksonville Jaguars ===
On December 10, 2018, Board was signed to the Jacksonville Jaguars practice squad. He signed a reserve/future contract with the Jaguars on December 31, 2018.

On November 25, 2019, Board was waived by the Jaguars and re-signed to the practice squad. He was promoted to the active roster on December 12, 2019. He was waived on August 12, 2020.

=== New York Giants ===
Board was claimed off waivers by the New York Giants on August 13, 2020. He re-signed with the team on March 17, 2021. He was released on September 7, 2021, and re-signed to the practice squad. He was signed to the active roster on September 25. On week 6 against the Los Angeles Rams Board fractured his forearm and was placed on injured reserve.

Board re-signed with the Giants on March 14, 2022. He was waived on August 30, 2022, and signed to the practice squad the next day. He was released on September 6.

=== Arizona Cardinals ===
On September 21, 2022, Board was signed to the Arizona Cardinals practice squad. He was released on October 10.

=== Tennessee Titans (second stint) ===
On October 17, 2022, Board was signed to the Titans practice squad. He was promoted to the active roster on November 17. He was placed on injured reserve with a rib injury on December 17.
