= Kyler Fackrell =

American football player (born 1991)

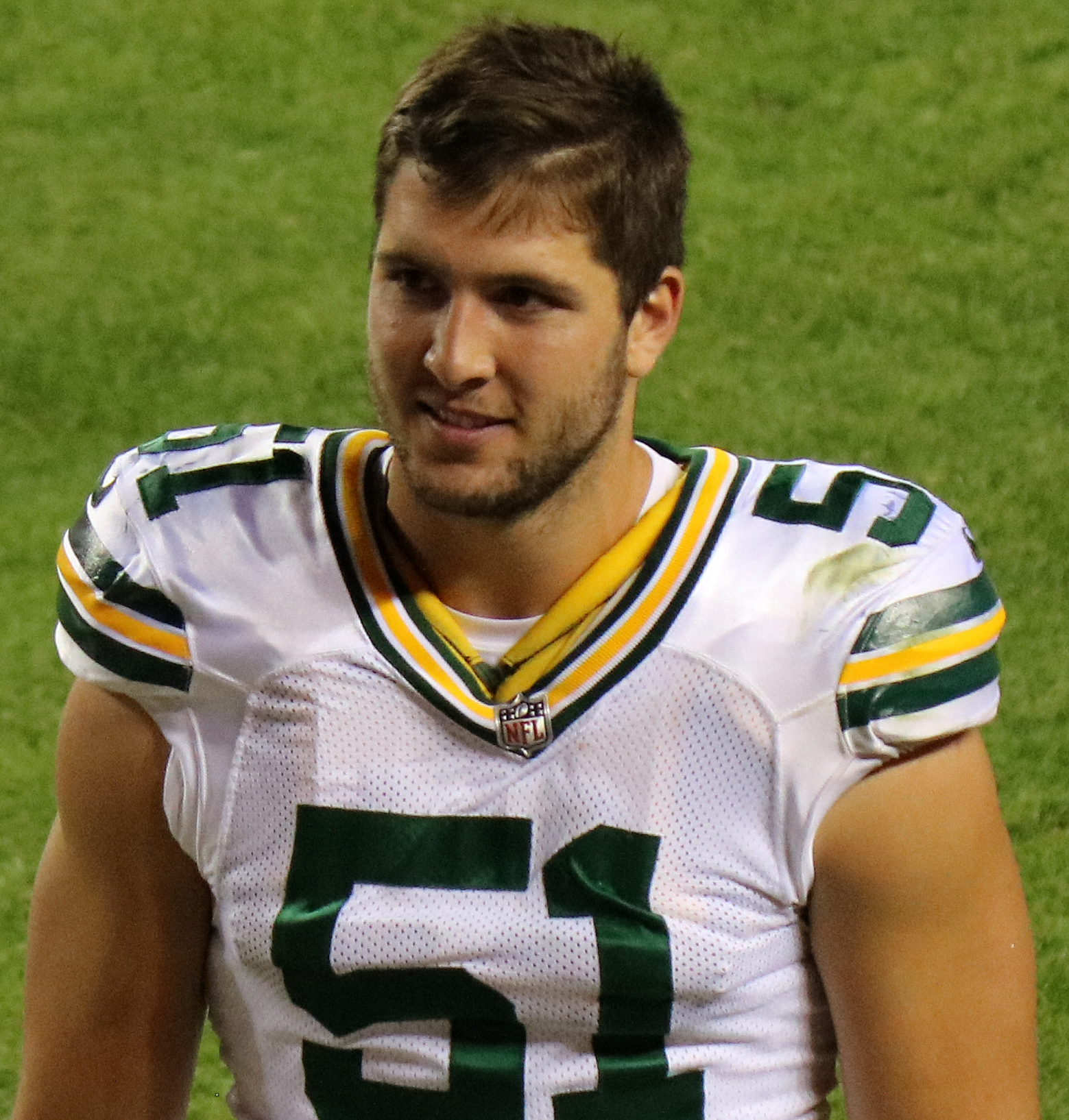
- Fackrell with the Green Bay Packers in 2017

No. 51, 52
- Position: Linebacker

Personal information
- Born: November 25, 1991 (age 34); Mesa, Arizona, U.S.
- Listed height: 6 ft 5 in (1.96 m)
- Listed weight: 245 lb (111 kg)

Career information
- High school: Mesa
- College: Utah State (2011–2015)
- NFL draft: 2016: 3rd round, 88th overall pick

Career history
- Green Bay Packers (2016–2019); New York Giants (2020); Los Angeles Chargers (2021); Las Vegas Raiders (2022)*; Baltimore Ravens (2022)*
- * Offseason or practice squad member only

Awards and highlights
- First-team All-MWC (2015); First-team All-WAC (2012)

Career NFL statistics
- Total tackles: 162
- Sacks: 23.5
- Pass deflections: 4
- Interceptions: 1
- Forced fumbles: 3
- Fumble recoveries: 2
- Touchdowns: 1
- Stats at Pro Football Reference

Kyler Bruce Fackrell (born November 25, 1991) is an American former professional football player who was a linebacker in the National Football League (NFL). He played high school football at Mesa High School in Mesa, Arizona, before playing college football for the Utah State Aggies. At Utah State, he was a four-year starter at linebacker where he was named to multiple All-Conference teams. He was selected by the Green Bay Packers in the third round of the 2016 NFL draft.

== Early life ==
Fackrell attended Mesa High School in Mesa, Arizona. He played linebacker, quarterback, and wide receiver for the Jackrabbits football team. In his senior year, he played three games at quarterback, 11 as a receiver, and played in all 14 games at linebacker. His team finished second in the state playoffs. He had 68 tackles (25 solo), eight passes defensed, two interceptions and forced a fumble on the defensive side of the ball. On offense, he had 36 receptions totaling 662 yards and five touchdowns; he also had 22 rushes for 159 yards and three touchdowns. As a quarterback, he completed 22 of 38 passes for 334 yards, four touchdowns, and one interception. In addition to football, he also lettered in basketball and volleyball.

Fackrell was not highly recruited coming out of high school and was only offered one division-one scholarship from Utah State University. Utah State decided to offer him a scholarship because one of his high school coaches knew an assistant coach there, which caused the university to take a look at him. Additionally, his father played for Utah State as a defensive end and his mother was a cheerleader.

== College career ==
Fackrell took a year off after high school and made a living painting houses while deciding whether or not to go on a Mormon mission. He ultimately decided to accept the scholarship to play football for the Utah State Aggies and received redshirt status his first year. In his first year of eligibility, he started all 13 games for the Aggies and had a career-high in sacks against San Jose State University; the team set a school single-game record with 13 total sacks in the game. He went on to block a field goal against New Mexico State. He finished the year as the first player in the school's history to be named a Freshman All-American and the fourth to win All-Conference First-team honors.

As a sophomore, Fackrell continued to impress as he again started all 14 games and led the team with 13 tackles for loss and also had two forced fumbles and five sacks. He had a career-high in tackles against BYU and was the Mountain West Conference's Defensive Player of the week. During the game against Hawaii, he intercepted a pass and returned it 99 yards for his first career touchdown; the return ranks as the third longest in school history. During a game later that year against Weber State, he caught a 4-yard pass and became the first person since 1964 in Utah State's history to have an offensive and defensive touchdown in the same season. His efforts earned him a spot on the All-Conference Second-team.

Fackrell's junior season was cut short by injury in the second quarter in the season opener against the Tennessee Volunteers as he suffered an ACL injury. He missed the rest of the year.

Coming back from the injury the next season, Fackrell started all 13 games and ranked first in the country with five fumble recoveries. On top of that, he also ranked first on the team with 15 tackles for loss and broke the school-record for 12 quarterback hurries; he also finished second in the season with 4 sacks. Two of those forced fumbles happened in a game against Boise State and he added a defensive touchdown when he recovered one of them in the endzone. He was named the Mountain West Conference Player of the Week two times that season. He finished his last year with the Aggies by being named a fourth-team All-American by Phil Steele and a First-team Conference selection.

== Professional career ==
=== Pre-draft ===
Fackrell was projected by Lance Zierlein of NFL.com to be a third round pick. He stated that he possessed "premium" athleticism and cited his multiple-sport career and high school. He also complimented his tackling ability and believed he was capable of becoming a pass rusher and mentioned his good cover ability. However, concerns were also brought up about his age, as he was one of the oldest players in the draft, and was coming back from an injury. One American Football Conference (AFC) scout mentioned that he was really talented but he can no longer play in space since his injury. Another AFC scout also mentioned that he had not been the same since the injury. During the NFL Combine, Fackrell commented that doctors were very interested in his knee. He also commented that scouts did not seem concerned about his age at first, but as the draft neared it became a larger concern.

Pre-draft measurables
Height	Weight	Arm length	Hand span	40-yard dash	10-yard split	Vertical jump	Broad jump	Bench press	Wonderlic
6 ft 5 in (1.96 m)	245 lb (111 kg)	33 1/4 in (0.84 m)	10 1/8 in (0.26 m)	4.72 s	1.61 s	34.5 in (0.88 m)	10 ft 1 in (3.07 m)	15 reps	32
All values from NFL Combine

=== Green Bay Packers ===
Fackrell was selected by the Green Bay Packers in the third round with the 88th overall pick in the 2016 NFL draft. The pick was criticized by ESPN Staff writer Rob Demovsky for failing to address what was believed to be the biggest need at inside linebacker. When Fackrell found out he was selected by the Packers, he and his wife fell to their knees in celebration. Fackrell was believed to be drafted by the Packers in part because of Julius Peppers' age and the fact he was entering the final year of his contract.

On September 25, 2016, Fackrell registered his first career sack on Detroit Lions quarterback Matthew Stafford in a 34–27 victory.

On September 10, 2017, in the season opener against the Seattle Seahawks, Fackrell recovered a Russell Wilson fumble, which was forced by teammate Mike Daniels, in a 17–9 win.

On September 30, 2018, Fackrell registered a career-high three sacks in the fourth quarter on Buffalo Bills quarterback Josh Allen in a 22–0 win. He had another three-sack performance on November 15 in a 27–24 loss to the Seahawks, and registered an additional four tackles for loss and four hits on Seahawks quarterback Russell Wilson. He finished the 2018 season with a career-high 42 tackles, and a team-leading 10.5 sacks.

=== New York Giants ===
On March 26, 2020, Fackrell signed a one-year contract with the New York Giants.

In Week 2 against the Chicago Bears, Fackrell recorded his first sack as a Giant on Mitchell Trubisky during the 17–13 loss. In Week 5 against the Dallas Cowboys, Fackrell intercepted a pass thrown by Dak Prescott and returned it for a 46-yard touchdown during the 37–34 loss. In Week 6 against the Washington Football Team, Fackrell recorded a strip sack on Kyle Allen which was recovered and returned by teammate Tae Crowder for a 43 yard touchdown during the 20–19 win.

On December 1, 2020, Fackrell was placed on injured reserve with a calf injury. On January 2, 2021, Fackrell was activated off of injured reserve.

=== Los Angeles Chargers ===
On March 24, 2021, Fackrell signed with the Los Angeles Chargers. He was placed on injured reserve on December 11. He was activated on January 8, 2022.

=== Las Vegas Raiders ===
On March 21, 2022, Fackrell signed a one-year contract with the Las Vegas Raiders. He was placed on season-ending injured reserve on July 29, 2022. He was released on August 31, 2022.

=== Baltimore Ravens ===
On September 7, 2022, Fackwell was signed to the practice squad of the Baltimore Ravens practice squad but was then released on September 19, 2022.

== NFL career statistics ==
Regular season statistics
Year	Team	GP	GS	Tackles					Interceptions						Fumbles	
Year	Team	GP	GS	Total	Solo	Ast	Sck	SFTY	PDef	Int	Yds	Avg	Lng	TDs	FF	FR
2016	GB	13	0	18	16	2	2.0	0	1	0	0	0	0	0	1	0
2017	GB	16	2	28	22	6	3.0	0	0	0	0	0	0	0	0	1
2018	GB	16	7	42	29	13	10.5	0	0	0	0	0	0	0	0	0
2019	GB	16	0	23	13	10	1.0	0	0	0	0	0	0	0	0	0
Total		61	9	111	80	31	16.5	0	1	0	0	0	0	0	1	1
Source: NFL.com

Postseason statistics
Year	Team	GP	GS	Tackles					Interceptions						Fumbles	
Year	Team	GP	GS	Total	Solo	Ast	Sck	SFTY	PDef	Int	Yds	Avg	Lng	TDs	FF	FR
2016	GB	3	0	2	1	1	0.0	0	0	0	0	0	0	0	0	0
2019	GB	2	0	3	2	0	1.0	0	0	0	0	0	0	0	0	0
Total		5	0	4	3	1	1.0	0	0	0	0	0	0	0	0	0
Source: pro-football-reference.com
