= Blake Martinez =

American football player (born 1994)

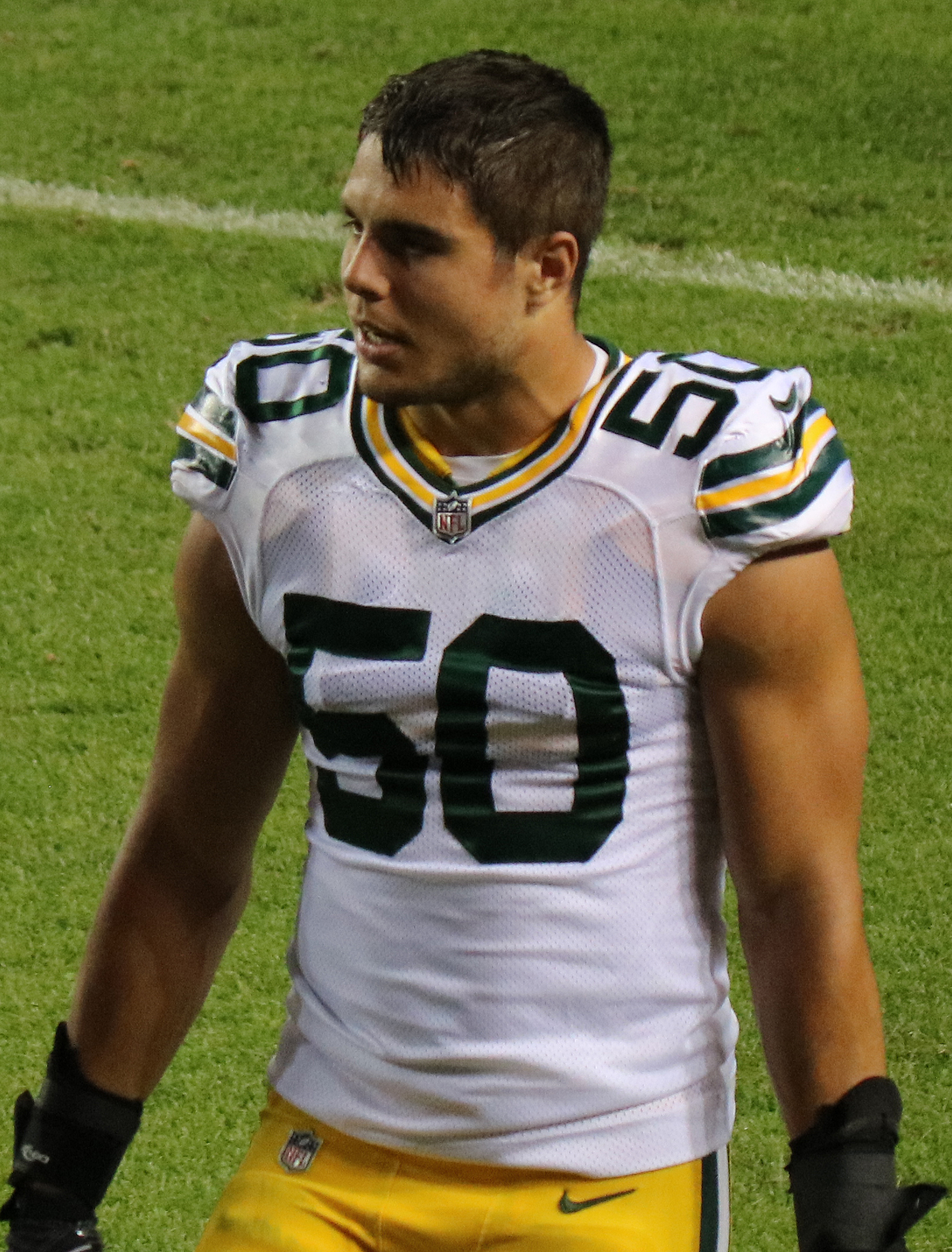
- Martinez with the Green Bay Packers in 2017

Profile
- Position: Linebacker

Personal information
- Born: January 9, 1994 (age 32); Tucson, Arizona, U.S.
- Listed height: 6 ft 2 in (1.88 m)
- Listed weight: 237 lb (108 kg)

Career information
- High school: Canyon del Oro (Oro Valley, Arizona)
- College: Stanford (2012–2015)
- NFL draft: 2016: 4th round, 131st overall pick

Career history
- Green Bay Packers (2016–2019); New York Giants (2020–2021); Las Vegas Raiders (2022); Carolina Panthers (2023)*; Pittsburgh Steelers (2023)
- * Offseason or practice squad member only

Awards and highlights
- NFL combined tackles co-leader (2017); Second-team All-American (2015); First-team All-Pac-12 (2015)

Career NFL statistics
- Total tackles: 710
- Sacks: 13.0
- Forced fumbles: 4
- Fumble recoveries: 3
- Pass deflections: 22
- Interceptions: 4
- Stats at Pro Football Reference

Blake Edmon Martinez (born January 9, 1994) is an American former professional football player who was a linebacker in the National Football League (NFL). Playing college football for the Stanford Cardinal, he was a two-year starter and named to the first-team All-Pac-12 team in 2015. Martinez was selected by the Green Bay Packers in the fourth round of the 2016 NFL draft, and played in the NFL for the Packers, New York Giants, and Las Vegas Raiders.

== Early life ==
Martinez who is of Mexican–American descent, was born in Tucson, Arizona, to Marc and Carrisa Martinez. He attended Canyon del Oro High School in Oro Valley, where he played tight end, running back, and linebacker under head coach Dustin Peace. In addition to lettering in football, he also lettered in basketball and volleyball. During his time at Canyon del Oro, he was named to the PrepStar All-West Region Team, and was also a Two-Time Defensive Player of the year. Additionally, he holds the school record with 247 tackles, while also amassing 1,100 total offensive yards his senior year.

Martinez was ranked as a three-star inside linebacker by Rivals.com. He received several scholarship offers from schools such as Stanford, Boise State, Oregon State, and San Jose State. He also received interest from Arizona, Arizona State, Northern Arizona, Oregon, and San Diego State. He ultimately signed his letter of intent to play with Stanford on August 1, 2011.

== College career ==
As a true freshman at Stanford University in 2012, Martinez played in fourteen games and had the first tackle of his college career against Duke University. At the end of the year, he received Stanford's Greg Piers Service Team Award on for his efforts on defense.

Continuing into his second year in 2013, Martinez played in 10 games and had 11 tackles (seven solo). His best game of the year coming against the rival California Golden Bears where he had six tackles, forced a fumble, and had his first career interception. At the end of the year, he was named an Academic All-Pac-12 Conference honorable mention.

Martinez had a breakout season in 2014 and started 13 games; in three of those games, he had over ten tackles. In arguably his best game of the season, he intercepted back-to-back passes that had been thrown by quarterback Jared Goff, the first overall draft pick in the 2016 NFL draft. This ended Goff's school record for most consecutive attempts without an interception. He also forced a fumble in a third and goal situation from Daniel Lasco. Martinez later commented that finishing off the game the way he did was "huge". He finished the year with a team-leading 102 tackles and was named an All-Pac-12 honorable mention and to Phil Steele's All-Pac-12 third team.

As a senior in 2015, Martinez was named to Phil Steele's All-America preseason fourth team and his All-Pac-12 First team. He played in 14 games and finished with a team-high 141 tackles (75 solo), 1.5 sacks, and six pass breakups. His efforts earned him being named to the All-Pac-12 first team by the Conference, Associated Press, and Phil Steele.

== Professional career ==
=== Pre-draft ===
On December 22, 2015, it was announced that Martinez was one of four Stanford players who had accepted their invitation to play in the Senior Bowl, along with Kevin Hogan, Joshua Garnett, and Kyle Murphy. On January 30, 2016, Martinez played in the Senior Bowl as part of Dallas Cowboys head coach Jason Garrett's South team that lost 27–16 to the North. He was one of 39 collegiate linebackers that attended the NFL Scouting Combine in Indianapolis, Indiana. Martinez completed all the drills, finishing second in the three-cone drill, third in the short shuttle, fifth in the bench press, and 11th among all linebackers in the 40-yard dash.

External videos
- Blake Martinez’s NFL Combine Workout

On March 17, 2016, Martinez attended Stanford's pro day and opted to stand on the majority of his combine numbers and only performed the 60-yard shuttle, vertical jump (34"), and positional drills. Team representatives and scouts from all 32 teams attended, including Philadelphia Eagles head coach Chip Kelly and Buffalo Bills general manager Doug Whaley. He attended a few private workouts and visits with multiple teams, including the Atlanta Falcons and Eagles. At the conclusion of the pre-draft process, he was projected to be a fourth to sixth round pick by NFL draft experts and scouts. He was ranked the sixth best inside linebacker prospect in the draft by NFLDraftScout.com and the tenth best linebacker by Sports Illustrated.

Pre-draft measurables
Height	Weight	Arm length	Hand span	40-yard dash	10-yard split	20-yard split	20-yard shuttle	Three-cone drill	Vertical jump	Broad jump	Bench press	Wonderlic
6 ft 1 5/8 in (1.87 m)	237 lb (108 kg)	31 5/8 in (0.80 m)	10 7/8 in (0.28 m)	4.71 s	1.61 s	2.73 s	4.20 s	6.98 s	28.5 in (0.72 m)	9 ft 5 in (2.87 m)	22 reps	27
All values from NFL Combine

=== Green Bay Packers ===
==== 2016 ====
The Green Bay Packers selected Martinez in the fourth round (131st overall) of the 2016 NFL draft. The Packers also selected his Stanford teammate Kyle Murphy in the sixth round (200th overall). On May 6, 2016, the Packers signed Martinez to a four-year, $2.72 million contract that included a signing bonus of $383,393.

External videos
- Packers draft Martinez 131st overall

During organized team activities, he worked with the first team defense and built a rapport with fellow inside linebacker Jake Ryan. He received first team reps due to Sam Barrington's absence after suffering a foot injury a year prior. Throughout training camp, he competed for a job at inside linebacker against Sam Barrington, Carl Bradford, and Joe Thomas. Martinez and Jake Ryan were dubbed "Jake and Blake' due to their chemistry and rapport the two had developed throughout off-season activities and open practices. The nickname is a play on "Shake and Bake", a catchphrase of popularized by the film Talladega Nights: The Ballad of Ricky Bobby.

External videos
- Blake Martinez bursts stitches vs. Lions

Head coach Mike McCarthy named Martinez and Ryan the starting inside linebackers, with Nick Perry and Clay Matthews III as the starting outside linebackers, to begin the regular season. He made his first career start and professional regular season debut in the Packers' season-opener at the Jacksonville Jaguars and recorded six combined tackles in their 27–23 victory. On October 20, 2016, he recorded five combined tackles, two pass break ups, and made his first career interception off Matt Barkley during a 26–10 win against the Chicago Bears. In Week 10, Martinez recorded a season-high ten combined tackles during a 47–25 loss at the Tennessee Titans. He missed three games (Week 12–14) after suffering an MCL sprain during the Packers' Week 11 loss at the Washington Redskins. On January 1, 2017, Martinez made three solo tackles and made his first career sack on Matthew Stafford in the Packers' 31–24 victory at the Detroit Lions. He finished his rookie season in 2016 with a total of 69 combined tackles (47 solo), four pass deflections, a sack, and an interception in 13 games and nine starts. He received an overall grade of 49.1 from Pro Football Focus, which ranked 68th among 88 qualifying linebackers.

The Packers finished atop the NFC North with a 10–6 record. On January 8, 2017, Martinez started his first career playoff game and recorded three combined tackles as the Packers defeated the New York Giants 38–13 in the NFC Wildcard game. The Packers then defeated the Cowboys, but were defeated 44–21 by the Falcons in the NFC Championship.

==== 2017 ====
Martinez and Ryan entered training camp slated as the starting inside linebackers. Martinez, Ryan, Matthews, and Perry returned as the starting linebacker corps under defensive coordinator Dom Capers to begin the 2017 regular season.

External videos
- Blake Martinez tips pass to Damarious Randall for INT
- Martinez slides to intercept tipped pass

On September 17, 2017, he collected five solo tackles and sacked Matt Ryan during their 34–23 loss at the Falcons. In Week 7, Martinez recorded a season-high 16 combined tackles in Green Bay's 26–17 loss to the New Orleans Saints. On November 26, 2017, he made 15 combined tackles, broke up a pass, and intercepted Ben Roethlisberger during a 31–28 loss at the Pittsburgh Steelers. Martinez finished the 2017 season with 144 combined tackles (96 solo), eight pass deflections, one sack, and one interception in 16 games and 16 starts. His 144 combined tackles tied for first in the league with Bills linebacker Preston Brown and Cleveland Browns linebacker Joe Schobert. He also led the team in tackles and was second on the team with 979 defensive snaps. Pro Football Focus gave Martinez an overall grade of 80.2 for 2017 and his grade ranked 23rd among all qualifying linebackers.

The Packers finished third in the NFC North with a 7–9 record and did not qualify for the playoffs. Defensive coordinator Dom Capers and offensive coordinator Edgar Bennett were both relieved of their duties after the season.

==== 2018 ====
Martinez retained his starting role as a starting inside linebacker in 2018. In Week 5, he recorded five combined tackles and made a season-high two sacks during a 31–23 loss at the Lions. On October 15, 2018, Martinez recorded a season-high 12 combined tackles (nine solo) as the Packers defeated the San Francisco 49ers 33–30 in Week 6. On December 3, 2018, the Packers announced their decision to fire head coach Mike McCarthy after a 20–17 loss against the Arizona Cardinals brought them to a 4–7 record. Offensive coordinator Joe Philbin became the interim head coach for the remaining five games. In a Week 14, Martinez tied his season-high of 12 combined tackles (11 solo) in a 34–20 victory against the Falcons. Martinez started in all 16 games in 2018 and recorded 144 combined tackles (91 solo), five sacks, and three pass deflections. He finished with the second most tackles among all players in 2018, behind Indianapolis Colts linebacker Shaquille Leonard. He received an overall grade of 74.8 from Pro Football Focus, which ranked 17th among all qualifying linebackers in 2018.

==== 2019 ====
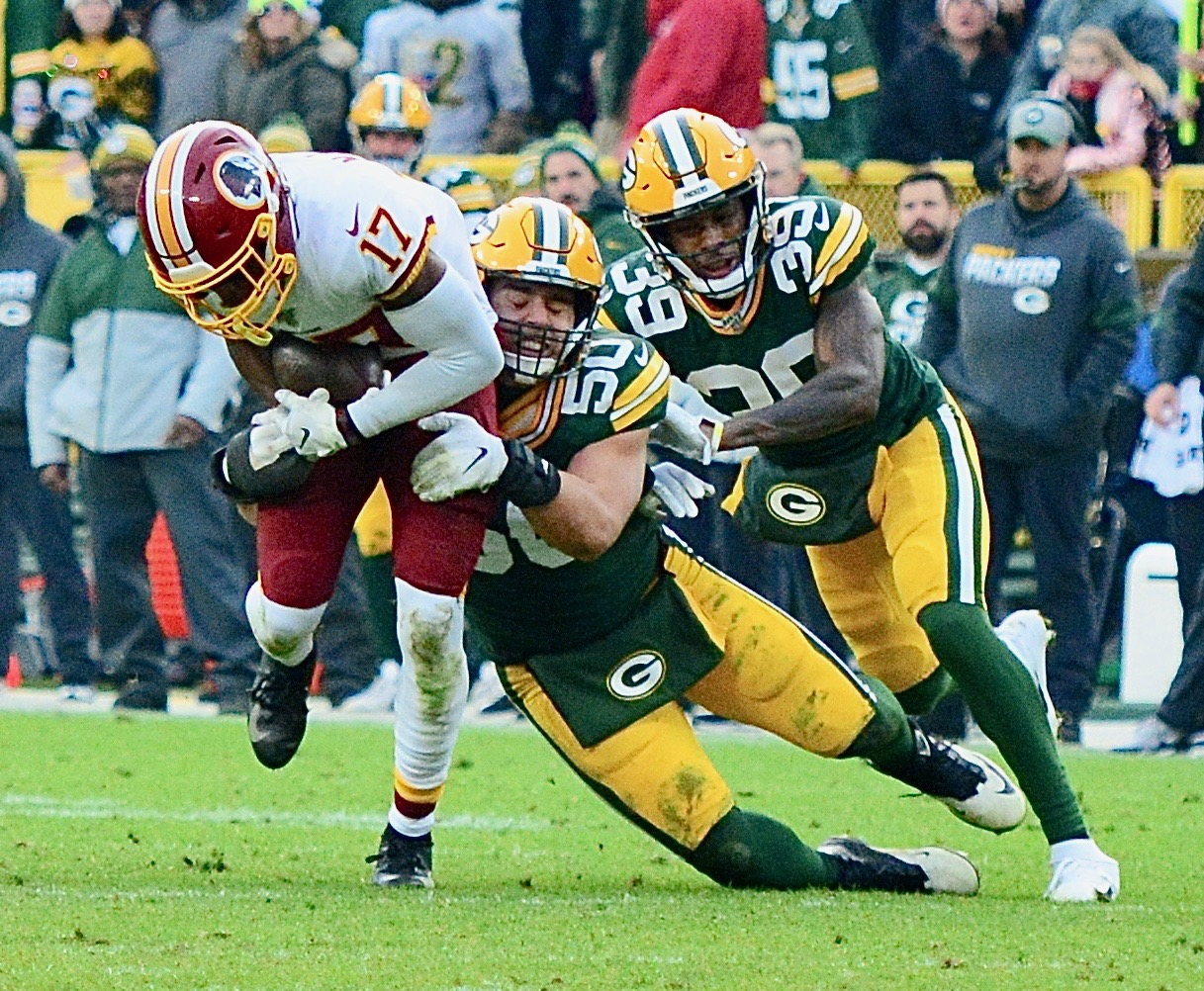
Martinez in a game against the Washington Redskins

In Week 1 against the Bears, Martinez recorded seven tackles and sacked Mitchell Trubisky in the 10–3 win. In week 7 against the Oakland Raiders, Martinez made a team high 16 tackles and forced Derek Carr to fumble the football into the end zone, causing a touchback, in a 42–24 win. In week 17 against the Lions, Martinez recorded a team high 7 tackles, sacked rookie quarterback David Blough once, and intercepted a pass thrown by Blough during the 23–20 win.

=== New York Giants ===
==== 2020 ====
On March 26, 2020, Martinez signed a three-year, $30 million contract with the New York Giants.

Martinez made his debut with the Giants in Week 1 against the Steelers on Monday Night Football. During the game, Martinez led the Giants with 13 tackles in the 26–16 loss. In Week 2 against the Bears, Martinez again led the team with 8 tackles and recorded his first sack of the season on Mitchell Trubisky during the 17–13 loss. In Week 9 against the Washington Football Team, Martinez led the team with 10 tackles and intercepted a pass thrown by Alex Smith during the 23–20 win. Martinez finished the 2020 season with 151 total tackles.

==== 2021 ====
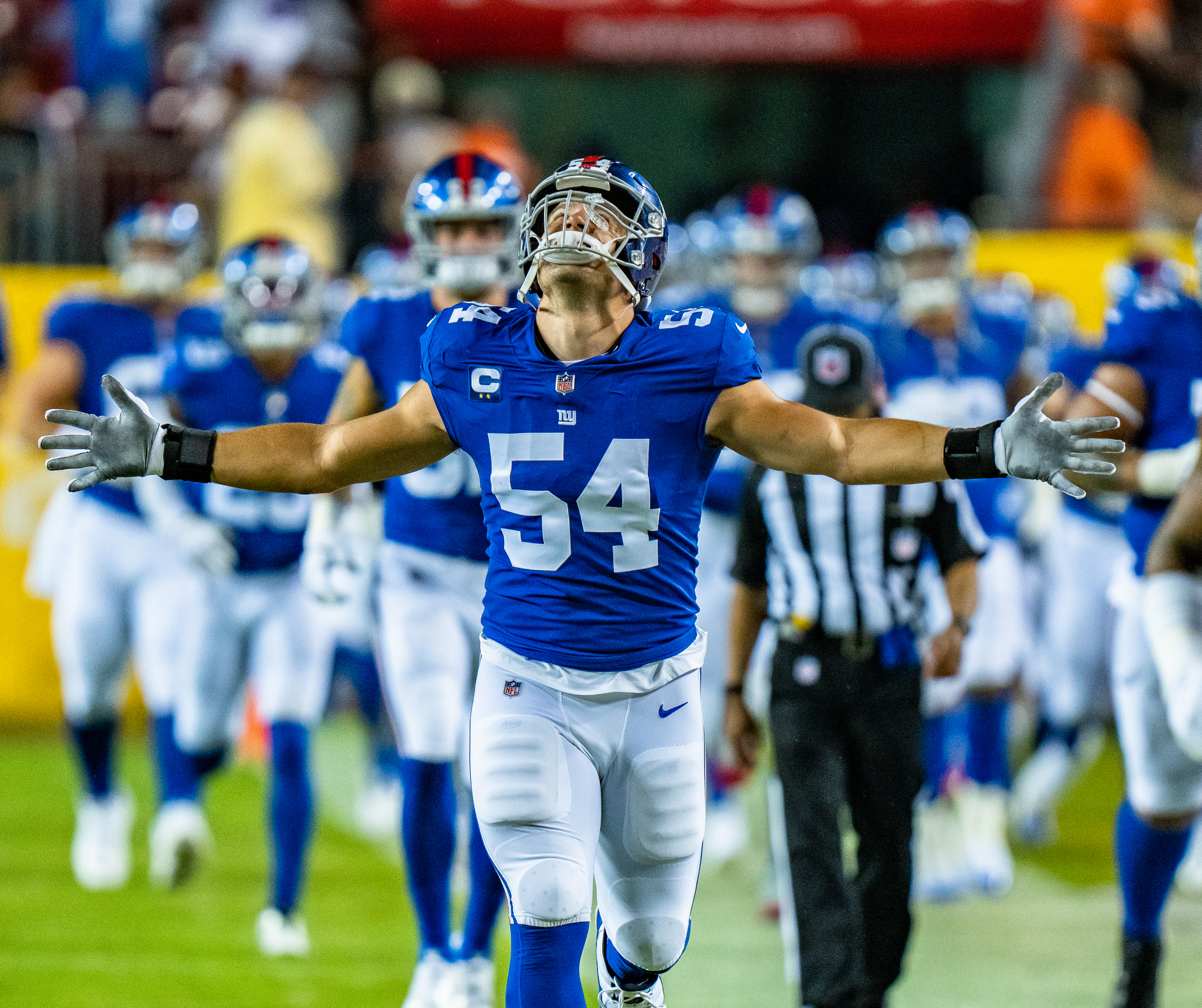
Martinez (center) with the Giants in 2021

In Week 3, Martinez suffered a torn ACL and was placed on season-ending injured reserve on September 29, 2021.

On September 1, 2022, Martinez was released.

=== Las Vegas Raiders ===
On October 4, 2022, Martinez signed for the practice squad of the Las Vegas Raiders and then signed to the active roster three days after.

=== Retirement ===
On November 10, 2022, Martinez announced his retirement from professional football after seven seasons, reportedly after he sold a rare Pokémon card for $672,000, making it one of the most expensive CCG cards ever sold. In February 2023, Martinez stated that he is still continuing to sell Pokémon cards and has made more than $5 million after seven months. His channel Blake's Breaks was one of the largest-volume Pokémon channels on Whatnot.

In August 2023, Martinez's Pokémon stream on the Whatnot platform was accused of scamming buyers by rigging casino-like games. Multiple videos of examples of the alleged scams surfaced and the Pokémon community launched their own investigations into the alleged scams, including a series of videos published to YouTube by the streamer RattlePokemon. The outcome of the allegations resulted in Whatnot permanently banning Blake's Breaks and multiple associates from the platform, as well as implementing updated ToS to prevent future scams from being run on their platform.

Martinez was released from the Raiders' retired list on October 17, 2023, in order for him to pursue a comeback with another team. He had a work-out with the Carolina Panthers on October 25, 2023.

=== Carolina Panthers ===
On November 6, 2023, Martinez officially signed a deal to join the Carolina Panthers practice squad.

=== Pittsburgh Steelers ===
On November 21, 2023, the Steelers signed Martinez to their 53-man roster from the Panthers' practice squad.

== NFL career statistics ==
=== Regular season ===
Year	Team	Games		Tackles				Interceptions						Fumbles	
Year	Team	GP	GS	Cmb	Solo	Ast	Sck	PD	Int	Yds	Avg	Lng	TD	FF	FR
2016	GB	13	9	69	47	22	1.0	4	1	4	4.0	4	0	0	0
2017	GB	16	16	144	96	48	1.0	8	1	3	3.0	3	0	1	2
2018	GB	16	16	144	91	52	5.0	3	0	0	0.0	0	0	0	0
2019	GB	16	16	155	97	58	3.0	2	1	22	22.0	22	0	1	0
2020	NYG	16	16	151	86	65	3.0	5	1	2	2.0	2	0	2	1
2021	NYG	3	3	23	11	12	0.0	0	0	0	0.0	0	0	0	0
2022	LV	4	2	20	14	6	0.0	0	0	0	0.0	0	0	0	0
2023	PIT	1	1	4	2	2	0.0	0	0	0	0.0	0	0	0	0
Total		85	79	710	444	266	13.0	22	4	31	7.8	22	0	4	3
Source: NFL.com

=== Postseason ===
Year	Team	Games		Tackles				Interceptions						Fumbles	
Year	Team	GP	GS	Cmb	Solo	Ast	Sck	PD	Int	Yds	Avg	Lng	TD	FF	FR
2016	GB	3	1	5	4	1	0.0	0	0	0	0.0	0	0	0	0
2019	GB	2	2	19	13	6	0.0	0	0	0	0.0	0	0	0	0
Total		5	3	24	17	7	0.0	0	0	0	0.0	0	0	0	0
Source: pro-football-reference.com
