= 2014 Capital One Bowl =

American college football game

Wisconsin Badgers	South Carolina Gamecocks
(9–3)	(10–2)
Big Ten	SEC
24	34
Head coach: Gary Andersen	Head coach: Steve Spurrier
AP / Coaches / BCS; 19 / 19 / 19	AP / Coaches / BCS; 8 / 8 / 9
	1	2	3	4	Total
Wisconsin	0	14	3	7	24
South Carolina	7	6	7	14	34
- Date: January 1, 2014
- Season: 2013
- Stadium: Florida Citrus Bowl
- Location: Orlando, Florida
- Favorite: Wisconsin by 1
- Referee: Jay Stricherz (Pac-12)
- Attendance: 56,629

United States TV coverage
- Network: ABC/ESPN Radio
- Announcers: Dave Pasch (play-by-play); Brian Griese (analyst); Tom Luginbill (sideline reporter)

The 2014 Capital One Bowl is an American college football bowl game that was played on January 1, 2014, at the Florida Citrus Bowl in Orlando, Florida. The 68th edition of the Capital One Bowl (previously called the Florida Citrus Bowl) featured the South Carolina Gamecocks from the Southeastern Conference versus the Wisconsin Badgers from the Big Ten Conference. It was one of the 2013–14 bowl games that concluded the 2013 FBS football season. The game started at 1:00 p.m. EST and was telecast on ABC. It was sponsored by the Capital One financial services corporation.

The Gamecocks defeated the Badgers by a score of 34–24. South Carolina quarterback Connor Shaw helped score all five of his team's touchdowns, throwing for three, rushing for one, and receiving for one.

South Carolina had a regular season record of 10–2 (6–2 SEC). Ranked #9 in the BCS, they finished in second place in the Southeastern Conference Eastern Division. Wisconsin had a record of 9–3 (6–2 Big Ten). They were ranked #19 in the BCS and finished in second place in the Big Ten Leaders Division. This was the first-ever meeting between the two schools.

== Teams ==
=== South Carolina ===
Ninth year head coach Steve Spurrier led the Gamecocks into the 2014 Capital One Bowl with a 10 win, 2 loss record. Snubbed from a BCS Bowl despite a higher ranking than teams who received bids, the Gamecocks finished the regular season ranked number nine in the country. South Carolina began their season by winning against North Carolina, but losing to Georgia. From there, they won four consecutive games, including a win against Central Florida, the Knights' only loss of the regular season. After a narrow loss to Tennessee, South Carolina closed their season winning five consecutive games before entering the bowl.

=== Wisconsin ===
Led by first-year head coach Gary Andersen, the Badgers entered the bowl with a nine win, three loss record. Headed into their final game, Wisconsin appeared on track to appear in a BCS Bowl, perhaps even the Rose Bowl, but after giving up numerous big plays, they were upset by the Penn State Nittany Lions. This ended their hopes of a BCS berth, though it turned out to be moot as Michigan State beat Ohio State in the Big Ten championship game, assuring Michigan State a trip to the Rose Bowl and virtually ensuring that the Big Ten's other potential BCS berth would go to the previously ranked #2 Ohio State. Prior to their loss to Penn State, the Badgers had won six consecutive games after starting the season 3–2 with losses to Arizona State and Ohio State. The 2014 edition of the Capital One bowl marked the fourth time in the previous ten seasons that Wisconsin would play in Florida Citrus Bowl Stadium (the game had various names during the span).

== Pregame buildup ==
Dubbed one of the top non-BCS bowls to watch, the Capital One featured two top teams who narrowly missed the BCS. College football prognosticators and analysts were divided in forecasting the game, relatively evenly split between picking South Carolina and Wisconsin.

=== Wisconsin offense vs. South Carolina defense ===
Establishing the line of scrimmage would be pivotal for both lines, as South Carolina ranked second in the SEC stopping the run, whereas Wisconsin was the number eight run offense in the FBS. Similarly, Wisconsin needed to prevent the game from resting "on Stave's shoulders":

"Stave's numbers aren't terrible, but when Wisconsin fails to run the football 40 times in a game, it is 0–3 this season. The Gamecocks only give up just over 200 passing yards per game, so should push come to shove, the Badgers may be out of luck trusting their fate to Stave." – Bleacher Report game preview column written by featured columnist Dave Radcliffe

==== Wisconsin offense ====
Coordinated by Andy Ludwig, Wisconsin was a rushing-focused offense that ranked eighth in the country in rushing yards per game (averaging 283), but were 88th with 203.8; they averaged 35.8 points per game, which was 26th overall. However, to be successful in a "dogfight" against South Carolina, they would need to establish the play action pass. 6 feet 5 inches (1.96 m) sophomore Joel Stave played quarterback, and completed 199 of his 323 passes (62%) for 2414 yards, 20 touchdowns, and 12 interceptions. At running back, the Badgers featured a "dynamic running back duo" comprising Melvin Gordon and James White, each of whom earned second team all-conference recognition. Gordon, a sophomore, was the speedster of the pair, rushed for 1466 total yards, averaging 8.1 yards per carry, which ranked fourth in the country, and totaled 12 touchdowns. White, a senior whom ESPN ranked as its 12th best running back draft prospect, totaled 1337 rushing yards on 209 carries for a total of 13 touchdowns. Freshman Corey Clement supplemented the tandem by adding 515 rushing yards and 7 touchdowns on 66 carries.

In the receiving game, the ultra-competitive Jared Abbrederis, a senior draft prospect, had more than twice as many receptions as the second-leading receiver on the team; Abbrederis earned first team all-conference accolades, and totaled 73 receptions for 1051 yards and 7 touchdowns. Senior tight end Jacob Pedersen was the team's second-leading receiver with 36 receptions, 501 yards, and 3 touchdowns. White caught 37 passes for 292 yards. A trio of other wide receivers – senior Jeff Duckworth, sophomore Jordan Frederick, and freshman Alex Erickson – also contributed, with each catching between 8 and 10 passes and between 100 and 200 yards. Wisconsin's offensive line was plagued by injuries all season long. Entering the bowl game, center Dallas Lewallen engaged in limited practice participation, and his status was "a major question mark"; if he could not play, Dan Voltz would start at center. Starting guard Kyle Costigan was also banged up entering the game. Other starters on the offensive line included sophomore Tyler Marz, who achieved honorable mention all-conference honors, 6 feet 8 inches (2.03 m) 327 pounds (148 kg) junior right tackle Rob Havenstein, who achieved second team all-conference honors, and first-team all-conference left guard Ryan Groy, a senior. Two kickers contributed during the season – sophomore Jack Russell, who made 8 of 11 field goal attempts with a long of 48 yards, and junior Kyle French, who made 5 of his 8 field goal attempts with a long of 42 yards ... French kicked at the beginning of the season, but midway through, Russell replaced him.

==== South Carolina defense ====
Coordinated by Lorenzo Ward, the Gamecocks' defense featured four defensive linemen, three linebackers, and four defensive backs. The Gamecocks' defensive line was a strong unit, placing two members on the first team all-conference team, Jadeveon Clowney and Kelcy Quarles. At defensive end, Clowney, a junior, did not live up to preseason expectations, recording only 35 tackles, although he did post 10.5 tackles for loss (TFL) and 3 sacks. At tackle, Quarles, a junior, recorded 36 tackles and a team-leading 13.5 TFL and 9.5 sacks. Also starting on the defensive line were fifth-year senior Chaz Sutton at end, and junior J.T. Surratt at tackle. At linebacker, undersized (6 feet 2 inches (1.88 m) 205 pounds (93 kg)) freshman Skai Moore started on the weak side, leading the defense with 51 total tackles. In the middle, sophomore Kaiwan Lewis started, and totaled 45 tackles and 4 TFL. On the strong side, also known as the "spur" position, as it is a hybrid between a safety and a linebacker, junior Sharrod Golightly started and recorded 44 tackles and 6 TFL, as well as 1.5 sacks. Sophomore Marquis Roberts was also a key contributor, playing in all games, and finishing third on the defense with 46 tackles, as was freshman T. J. Holloman, who recorded three interceptions, tied for the team lead. Though secondary did not place any members on the all-conference team, they limited opponents to just 202.8 passing yards per game, which was 19th in the country. Anchoring the secondary was fifth-year senior cornerback Jimmy Legree, who finished second on the defense with 47 tackles, including 5.5 TFL, as well as 3 interceptions, which was tied for the team lead. Junior Victor Hampton started opposite Legree at the other corner, and recorded 45 tackles, and also had 3 interceptions. At safety, junior Brison Williams and freshman Chaz Elder started, and recorded 43 and 27 tackles respectively.

=== South Carolina offense vs. Wisconsin defense ===
For South Carolina to succeed offensively, they needed to establish a dual-threat attack with Connor Shaw, needing him to rush in addition to pass, coupling his rushing ability with Mike Davis; it would be difficult, however, for them to do so, as Wisconsin featured a veteran front seven on defense:

Badgers have gone up against several dual-threat quarterbacks this season and had success, for the most part, at limiting their running ability. Shaw can do it all for South Carolina, so the Badgers have to respect his arm while also accounting for his rushing. – Bleacher Report game preview column written by featured columnist Dave Radcliffe

==== South Carolina offense ====
Co-coordinated by Steve Spurrier Jr. and Shawn Elliott, both of whom were in their second year in the position, South Carolina's offense finished 49th nationally in passing yards per game (248.3), 30th nationally in rushing yards per game (205.3), 33rd nationally in total yards per game (453.5), and 34th nationally in points per game (34.1). The predominant quarterback for the Gamecocks was Connor Shaw, who completed 61-percent of his passes for 2135 yards and 21 touchdowns with only 1 interception, however junior Dylan Thompson also saw playing time and completed 52 of 89 passes for 783 yards, 4 touchdowns, and 3 interceptions. The Gamecocks' rushing attack centered around "shifty but stocky" (5 feet 9 inches (1.75 m) 215 pounds (98 kg)) Mike Davis, a sophomore second team all-conference performer, who recorded 1134 rushing yards and 11 touchdowns on 194 carries. The secondary contributor was Shaw, who rushed for 511 yards and 5 touchdowns. Other contributors included sophomore running backs Shon Carson and Brandon Wilds, as well as sophomore wide receiver Pharoh Cooper.

South Carolina featured a plethora of contributors in the receiving game, with seven making more than 10 catches. Juniors Bruce Ellington and Damiere Byrd, both of whom were 5 feet 9 inches (1.75 m) tall, anchored the group, totaling 43 receptions, 635 yards, and 6 touchdowns, and 33 receptions, 575 yards, and 4 touchdowns respectively. Third and fourth respectively in receiving yards were Davis, who posted 343 yards, and sophomore Shaq Roland, who posted 342. Other contributors included junior Nick Jones, and two tight ends – junior Rory Anderson and sophomore Jerell Adams, the latter duo of whom combined for 27 passes for 405 yards and 1 total touchdown. The Gamecocks' offensive line did not place any members on the all-conference team. Though did "control the line of scrimmage" in the rushing attack, it struggled in pass protection. Characterized by ESPN as "huge", he left side of the line featured 341 pounds (155 kg) junior tackle Corey Robinson and 314 pounds (142 kg) junior guard A. J. Cann, while the right side featured 323 pounds (147 kg) sophomore tackle Brandon Shell and 315 pounds (143 kg) senior guard Ronald Patrick. At center, both 319 pounds (145 kg) Cody Waldrop and 281 pounds (127 kg) Clayton Stadnik both redshirt freshmen. Freshman Elliott Fry handled the kicking duties, making 15 of 18 field goal attempts with a long of 45 yards, and made 50 of 51 extra point attempts.

==== Wisconsin defense ====
Led by first-year defensive coordinator Dave Aranda, Wisconsin entered the bowl coming off a performance against Penn State that, according to Aranda, lacked "intensity and focus", leading to confusion, particularly when making substitutions, against Penn State. One article opined,

The previous game could not have been more out of character for the nation's No. 6 defense, which is allowing 294 yards per game and was so reliable for most of the season. And it's a loss that will stick with Aranda for a long time. – Wisconsin State Journal writer Tom Mulhern

The defense was the nation's fifth-best scoring defense, holding opponents to 14.8 points per game, and sixth-best defense in terms of yards per game, averaging 294 yards per game.

A 3-4 defense, Wisconsin's defensive line consisted solely of seniors – defensive end Pat Muldoon, who totaled 28 tackles, 4.5 TFL, and 2 sacks, nose tackle Beau Allen, an honorable mention all-conference performer who totaled 19 tackles, 2 TFL, and 1.5 sacks, and defensive end Ethan Hemer, who totaled 11 tackles. All-American Chris Borland anchored the Badgers' linebackers, totaling 102 tackles, including 8.5 for a loss and 4 sacks. Fellow senior Conor O'Neill also started on the inside, and recorded 39 tackles, including 4.5 TFL and 2 sacks. The outside linebackers were seniors Ethan Armstrong, who was third on the team with 48 tackles, 5 TFL, and 2 sacks, and Brendan Kelly, who recorded 32 tackles, 7 TFL, and 4.5 sacks. The secondary included a variety of contributors. At safety, sophomore Michael Caputo was second on the defense with 62 tackles, fifth-year senior Dezmen Southward, an honorable mention all-conference performer, totaled 37 tackles and 1 interception, and redshirt freshman Nate Hammon, who recorded 24 tackles. At cornerback, freshman Sojourn Shelton led the defense with 4 interceptions, and sophomore Darius Hillary recorded 1 interception and 28 tackles.

== Game summary ==
=== Scoring summary ===
Scoring summary

Quarter	Time	Drive			Team	Scoring information	Score	
Quarter	Time	Plays	Yards	TOP	Team	Scoring information	Wisconsin	South Carolina
1	0:41	1	39	0:11	SC	Bruce Ellington 39-yard touchdown reception from Connor Shaw, Elliott Fry kick good	0	7
2	12:45	6	71	2:49	Wis	Sam Arneson 1-yard touchdown reception from Joel Stave, Jack Russell kick good	7	7
2	6:48	12	86	5:57	SC	Connor Shaw 9-yard touchdown reception from Bruce Ellington, 2-point run failed	7	13
2	0:13	16	75	6:35	Wis	Jeff Duckworth 3-yard touchdown reception from Joel Stave, Jack Russell kick good	14	13
3	11:19	7	47	3:41	Wis	35-yard field goal by Jack Russell	17	13
3	3:29	9	75	4:55	SC	Bruce Ellington 22-yard touchdown reception from Connor Shaw, Elliott Fry kick good	17	20
4	11:05	6	74	3:09	SC	Jerell Adams 3-yard touchdown reception from Connor Shaw, Elliott Fry kick good	17	27
4	10:54	–	–	–	Wis	Kenzel Doe returns kickoff 91 yards, Jack Russell kick good	24	27
4	5:48	9	88	5:06	SC	Connor Shaw 1-yard touchdown run, Elliott Fry kick good	24	34
"TOP" = time of possession. For other American football terms, see Glossary of American football.							24	34

=== Statistics ===
Statistics	Wisconsin	S. Carolina
First downs	21	20
Total offense, plays – yards	69–410	60–438
Rushes-yards (net)	43–293	34–117
Passing yards (net)	117	321
Passes, Comp-Att-Int	16–26–3	23–26–0
Time of Possession	29:26	30:34
