= 2013 Wisconsin Badgers football team =

American college football season

2013 Wisconsin Badgers football

Capital One Bowl vs. South Carolina, L 24–34
- Conference: Big Ten Conference
- Leaders Division

Ranking
- Coaches: No. 21
- AP: No. 22
- Record: 9–4 (6–2 Big Ten)
- Head coach: Gary Andersen (1st season)
- Offensive coordinator: Andy Ludwig (1st season)
- Offensive scheme: Pro-style
- Defensive coordinator: Dave Aranda (1st season)
- Base defense: 3–4
- MVP: Chris Borland
- Captain: (selected by game)
- Home stadium: Camp Randall Stadium

2013 Big Ten Conference football standings
	Conf.			Overall
Team	W		L	W		L
Legends Division
No. 3 Michigan State x$	8	–	0	13	–	1
Iowa	5	–	3	8	–	5
Nebraska	5	–	3	9	–	4
Minnesota	4	–	4	8	–	5
Michigan	3	–	5	7	–	6
Northwestern	1	–	7	5	–	7
Leaders Division
No. 12 Ohio State x%	8	–	0	12	–	2
No. 22 Wisconsin	6	–	2	9	–	4
Penn State*	4	–	4	7	–	5
Indiana	3	–	5	5	–	7
Illinois	1	–	7	4	–	8
Purdue	0	–	8	1	–	11
Championship: Michigan State 34, Ohio State 24
$ – BCS representative as conference champion; % – BCS at-large representative; x – Division champion/co-champions; Penn State ineligible for conference championship game and post-season bowl games due to NCAA sanctions; Rankings from AP Poll

The 2013 Wisconsin Badgers football team represented the University of Wisconsin–Madison in the 2013 NCAA Division I FBS football season. The Badgers, led by first year head coach Gary Andersen, were members of the Leaders Division of the Big Ten Conference and played their home games at Camp Randall Stadium.

== Recruiting ==
College recruiting information (2013)
Name	Hometown	School	Height	Weight	40^{‡}	Commit date
Hayden Biegel; OL	Wisconsin Rapids, WI	Lincoln HS	6 ft 6 in (1.98 m)	240 lb (110 kg)	N/A	Jun 17, 2012
Hayden Biegel; OL	Recruit ratings: Scout: Rivals: (74)					
Keelon Brookins; DB	Oakdale, MN	Tartan HS	5 ft 11 in (1.80 m)	185 lb (84 kg)	4.4	Jul 25, 2012
Keelon Brookins; DB	Recruit ratings: Scout: Rivals: (75)					
Corey Clement; RB	Glassboro, NJ	Glassboro HS	5 ft 11 in (1.80 m)	205 lb (93 kg)	N/A	Nov 2, 2012
Corey Clement; RB	Recruit ratings: Scout: Rivals: (83)					
Garret Dooley; LB	Rochester, IL	Rochester HS	6 ft 2 in (1.88 m)	215 lb (98 kg)	N/A	Feb 27, 2012
Garret Dooley; LB	Recruit ratings: Scout: Rivals: (81)					
Matt Hubley; DB	Waukesha, WI	Catholic Memorial HS	6 ft 1 in (1.85 m)	205 lb (93 kg)	N/A	Oct 23, 2012
Matt Hubley; DB	Recruit ratings: Scout: Rivals: (69)					
Leon Jacobs; LB	Santa Clarita, CA	Golden Valley HS	6 ft 4 in (1.93 m)	220 lb (100 kg)	N/A	Jan 26, 2013
Leon Jacobs; LB	Recruit ratings: Scout: Rivals: (77)					
Alec James; DE	Brookfield, WI	Brookfield East HS	6 ft 4 in (1.93 m)	220 lb (100 kg)	N/A	Aug 16, 2012
Alec James; DE	Recruit ratings: Scout: Rivals: (82)					
Jack Keeler; OL	Barrington, IL	Barrington HS	6 ft 7 in (2.01 m)	285 lb (129 kg)	5.1	May 3, 2012
Jack Keeler; OL	Recruit ratings: Scout: Rivals: (81)					
Tanner McEvoy; QB	Yuma, AZ	Arizona Western CC	6 ft 5 in (1.96 m)	215 lb (98 kg)	N/A	Feb 4, 2013
Tanner McEvoy; QB	Recruit ratings: Scout: Rivals: (79)					
Matt Miller; OL	Perrysburg, OH	St. Johns HS	6 ft 5 in (1.96 m)	260 lb (120 kg)	4.9	Jun 27, 2012
Matt Miller; OL	Recruit ratings: Scout: Rivals: (76)					
Chikwe Obasih; DE	Brookfield, WI	Central HS	6 ft 3 in (1.91 m)	231 lb (105 kg)	5.0	Apr 29, 2012
Chikwe Obasih; DE	Recruit ratings: Scout: Rivals: (79)					
Jazz Peavy; WR	Kenosha, WI	Kenosha Tremper HS	6 ft 1 in (1.85 m)	175 lb (79 kg)	4.4	Jun 17, 2012
Jazz Peavy; WR	Recruit ratings: Scout: Rivals: (73)					
Austin Ramesh; LB/FB	Eagle River, WI	Northland Pines HS	6 ft 2 in (1.88 m)	215 lb (98 kg)	N/A	Jun 28, 2013
Austin Ramesh; LB/FB	Recruit ratings: Scout: Rivals: (75)					
T.J. Reynard; DB	Independence, KS	Independence CC	5 ft 11 in (1.80 m)	180 lb (82 kg)	N/A	May 5, 2013
T.J. Reynard; DB	Recruit ratings: Scout: Rivals: (N/A)					
Sojourn Shelton; DB	Plantation, FL	Plantation HS	5 ft 10 in (1.78 m)	150 lb (68 kg)	4.5	Oct 9, 2012
Sojourn Shelton; DB	Recruit ratings: Scout: Rivals: (80)					
Donnell Vercher; DB	Fresno, CA	Fresno City CC	6 ft 2 in (1.88 m)	200 lb (91 kg)	4.4	Feb 5, 2013
Donnell Vercher; DB	Recruit ratings: Scout: Rivals: (76)					
Jakarrie Washington; DB	Everett, MA	Everett HS	5 ft 11 in (1.80 m)	170 lb (77 kg)	4.4	Jan 24, 2013
Jakarrie Washington; DB	Recruit ratings: Scout: Rivals: (69)					
T. J. Watt; TE	Pewaukee, WI	Pewaukee HS	6 ft 4 in (1.93 m)	215 lb (98 kg)	4.8	Apr 1, 2012
T. J. Watt; TE	Recruit ratings: Scout: Rivals: (71)					
Rob Wheelwright; WR	Columbus, OH	Walnut Ridge HS	6 ft 3 in (1.91 m)	185 lb (84 kg)	N/A	Apr 28, 2012
Rob Wheelwright; WR	Recruit ratings: Scout: Rivals: (79)					
Overall recruit ranking:
‡ Refers to 40-yard dash; Note: In many cases, Scout, Rivals, 247Sports, On3, and ESPN may conflict in their listings of height, weight and 40 time.; In these cases, the average was taken. ESPN grades are on a 100-point scale.; Sources: "Wisconsin Badgers Commits 2013". ESPN.; "2013 Team Ranking". Rivals.com.

== Watchlists and preseason awards ==
- Jared Abbrederis
  Fred Biletnikoff Award
  Paul Hornung Award
- Chris Borland
  Bednarik Award
  Bronko Nagurski Trophy
  Butkus Award
  Lombardi Award
  Lott IMPACT Trophy
- Melvin Gordon
  Doak Walker Award
- Ryan Groy
  Outland Trophy
  Lombardi Award
- Jacob Pedersen
  John Mackey Award
- James White
  Doak Walker Award
  Maxwell Award

== Schedule ==
Date	Time	Opponent	Rank	Site	TV	Result	Attendance
August 31	11:00 a.m.	Massachusetts*	No. 23	Camp Randall Stadium; Madison, WI	BTN	W 45–0	76,306
September 7	11:00 a.m.	Tennessee Tech*	No. 21	Camp Randall Stadium; Madison, WI	BTN	W 48–0	77,785
September 14	9:30 p.m.	at Arizona State*	No. 20	Sun Devil Stadium; Tempe, AZ	ESPN	L 30–32	66,155
September 21	2:30 p.m.	Purdue	No. 24	Camp Randall Stadium; Madison, WI	ABC	W 41–10	80,772
September 28	7:00 p.m.	at No. 4 Ohio State	No. 23	Ohio Stadium; Columbus, OH	ABC	L 24–31	105,826
October 12	2:30 p.m.	No. 19 Northwestern^{†}		Camp Randall Stadium; Madison, WI	ABC	W 35–6	81,411
October 19	7:00 p.m.	at Illinois	No. 25	Memorial Stadium; Champaign, IL	BTN	W 56–32	47,362
November 2	11:00 a.m.	at Iowa	No. 22	Kinnick Stadium; Iowa City, IA (Battle for the Heartland Trophy)	ABC	W 28–9	69,812
November 9	2:30 p.m.	BYU*	No. 21	Camp Randall Stadium; Madison, WI	ESPN	W 27–17	80,191
November 16	11:00 a.m.	Indiana	No. 17	Camp Randall Stadium; Madison, WI	ESPN2	W 51–3	77,849
November 23	2:30 p.m.	at Minnesota	No. 16	TCF Bank Stadium; Minneapolis, MN (Battle for Paul Bunyan's Axe)	ESPN	W 20–7	53,090
November 30	2:30 p.m.	Penn State	No. 14	Camp Randall Stadium; Madison, WI	ESPN	L 24–31	78,064
January 1, 2014	12:00 p.m.	vs. No. 8 South Carolina*	No. 19	Florida Citrus Bowl Stadium; Orlando, FL (Capital One Bowl)	ABC	L 24–34	56,629
*Non-conference game; ^{†}Homecoming; Rankings from AP Poll released prior to the game; All times are in Central time

== Rankings ==
Ranking movements Legend: ██ Increase in ranking ██ Decrease in ranking — = Not ranked RV = Received votes
	Week																
Poll	Pre	1	2	3	4	5	6	7	8	9	10	11	12	13	14	15	Final
AP	23	21	20	24	23	RV	RV	25	22	22	21	17	16	14	21	19	22
Coaches	23	21	18	RV	24	RV	RV	RV	24	23	22	20	17	14	21	19	21
Harris	Not released							RV	24	24	22	21	19	15	21	19	Not released
BCS	Not released								—	24	24	22	19	15	21	19	Not released

== Regular season ==
=== Massachusetts ===
UMass at #23 Wisconsin

Team	1	2	3	4	Total
Minutemen	0	0	0	0	0
• #23 Badgers	10	7	21	7	45

- Date: August 31
- Location: Camp Randall Stadium
  Madison, WI
- Game start: 11:00 a.m. CST
- Elapsed time: 3:00
- Game attendance: 76,306
- Game weather: Partly cloudy, 72 °F (22 °C), wind: E 4 MPH
- Referee: Todd Geerlings
- TV announcers (BTN): Wayne Larrivee and Jon Jansen

Scoring summary
1	12:29	Wisconsin	Joel Stave 4-yard run (Kyle French kick)	Wisconsin 7–0
1	00:17	Wisconsin	Kyle French 21-yard field goal	Wisconsin 10–0
2	3:33	Wisconsin	Melvin Gordon 70-yard run (Kyle French kick)	Wisconsin 17–0
3	13:38	Wisconsin	Jared Abbrederis 65-yard pass from Joel Stave (Kyle French kick)	Wisconsin 24–0
3	10:32	Wisconsin	James White 51-yard run (Kyle French kick)	Wisconsin 31–0
3	04:46	Wisconsin	Jared Abbrederis 57-yard pass from Joel Stave (Kyle French kick)	Wisconsin 38–0
4	13:30	Wisconsin	Corey Clement 23-yard run (Kyle French kick)	Wisconsin 45–0

The Badgers' first game of the 2013 season was a first for many. It was new Wisconsin head coach Gary Andersen's first game and it was the first time the Badgers had ever squared off against the UMass Minutemen.

Wisconsin received the opening kickoff and marched right down the field and scored on a 4-yard touchdown run by quarterback Joel Stave. On the Minutemen's first offensive play, Wisconsin's linebacker Brendan Kelly forced a fumble that was recovered by fellow linebacker Ethan Armstrong. On the very next play, Joel Stave threw an interception. The Badgers managed a 21-yard field goal by Kyle French before the end of the first quarter for a 10–0 lead. After a UMass punt, Wisconsin missed a 40-yard field goal and then UMass missed a 47-yard field goal. On the second play of the next Badgers drive, running back Melvin Gordon sprinted down the sideline for a 70-yard touchdown run. The Badgers led 17–0 at the half.

UMass started with the ball in the second half but after a three-and-out, the Badgers scored on their first offensive play of the second half with Joel Stave connecting with wide receiver Jared Abbrederis on a 65-yard touchdown pass. Another UMass punt and then three plays later running back James White scores on a 51-yard touchdown run. UMass then put together a nice drive that got down to the Badgers 38-yard line but Wisconsin CB Sojour Shelton intercepted the UMass pass. The Badgers took over at their own 22-yard line and five plays later they were in the end zone again with a 57-yard touchdown pass to Jared Abbrederis from Joel Stave. At the end of the third quarter, Wisconsin led 38–0. The Badgers would close out the scoring less than two minutes into the fourth quarter with a 23-yard touchdown run by true freshman running back, Corey Clement, his first career touchdown. UMass then used a 12-play drive to get down to the Badgers 33-yard line but failed on a fourth down conversion. A heavy dose of running the ball with Corey Clement help the Badgers run off the final seven and a half minutes of the game and giving Wisconsin a 45–0 victory.

Game notes

- It was Wisconsin's 17th straight home opener, dating to 1996.
- It was the first shutout for Wisconsin since blanking Oregon State, 35–0, on September 10, 2011. It was also their most lop-sided shutout since a 65–0 win over Temple on September 10, 2005.
- Wisconsin converted 8 of 11 third downs (72.7%), its highest single-game conversion percentage since converting 11-of-15 third downs (73.3%) against Washington State on September 1, 2007.
- Joel Stave scored the Badgers’ first TD of the season on a 4-yard run. It was Stave's first career rushing touchdown.
- Jared Abbrederis entered the game as the leader among active FBS players in yards per reception at 16.6 ypc. He has 13 career catches of at least 40 yards. He finished with two catches for 122 yards (61.0 ypc).
- James White entered the game with the best career yards per carry average in school history and among active FBS running backs (6.1 ypc.). He rushed 11 times for 143 yards in the game, an average of 13.0 ypc. Included among his runs was a 47-yarder in the first quarter and a 51-yard TD run in the third quarter. He now has 10 career runs of 40+ yards.
- Sophomore RB Melvin Gordon led the nation with a 10.0 average yard per carry last year. He gained 144 yards on 13 carries in the game (11.1 ypc.), including a 70-yard TD run in the second quarter. That was his longest career run, surpassing a 60-yard run he had against Nebraska in last year's Big Ten Championship game.
- True freshman RB Corey Clement made his UW debut, finishing with 16 carries for 101 yards and scoring his first career touchdown on a 23-yard run in the fourth quarter. Clement is the first true freshman at UW to run for at least 100 yards in a season opener since the NCAA rule allowing true freshmen to play came into effect for the 1972 season.
- Corey Clement is the first Badger to rush for 100 yards in his debut since P. J. Hill ran for 130 yards on 22 carries with a touchdown in a 35–14 win at Bowling Green on September 2, 2006.
- Melvin Gordon, James White and Corey Clement all surpassed the 100-yard rushing mark for just the third time in school history. UW also had three 100-yard rushers against Nebraska in the 2012 Big Ten Championship Game on December 1, 2012, and vs. Indiana on November 8, 2008.
- Freshman CB Sojourn Shelton was the first true freshman to start a season-opener for the Badgers since Travis Frederick started at center vs. Northern Illinois in 2009. Shelton picked up an interception in his debut, coming in the third quarter.

Statistical leaders

- Rushing: Melvin Gordon – 13 Car, 146 yds, 1 TD
- Passing: Joel Stave – 9/17, 197 yds, 2 TDs, INT
- Receiving: Jared Abbrederis – 2 Rec, 122 yds, 2 TDs
- Defense: Chris Borland – 9 Tkls

=== Tennessee Tech ===
Tennessee Tech at #21 Wisconsin

Team	1	2	3	4	Total
Golden Eagles	0	0	0	0	0
• #21 Badgers	14	14	6	14	48

- Date: September 7
- Location: Camp Randall Stadium
  Madison, WI
- Game start: 11:00 a.m. CST
- Elapsed time: 3:14
- Game attendance: 77,785
- Game weather: Partly Cloudy, 79 °F (26 °C), Wind: SSW 7 MPH
- Referee: Shawn Smith
- TV announcers (BTN): Kevin Kugler and Derek Rackley

Scoring summary
1	11:53	Wisconsin	Derek Straus 3-yard pass from Joel Stave (Kyle French kick)	Wisconsin 7–0
1	05:29	Wisconsin	Jared Abbrederis 6-yard pass from Joel Stave (Kyle French kick)	Wisconsin 14–0
2	03:51	Wisconsin	Melvin Gordon 37-yard run (Kyle French kick)	Wisconsin 21–0
2	00:19	Wisconsin	Brian Wozniak 6-yard pass from Joel Stave (Kyle French kick)	Wisconsin 28–0
3	09:13	Wisconsin	James White 2-yard run (Kyle French kick failed)	Wisconsin 34–0
4	08:28	Wisconsin	Corey Clement 1-yard run (Jack Russell kick)	Wisconsin 41–0
4	06:04	Wisconsin	Corey Clement 75-yard run (Jack Russell kick)	Wisconsin 48–0

In the Badgers' second game, they faced another opponent whom they had never faced in the school's history, the Tennessee Tech Golden Eagles.

Tennessee Tech received the opening kickoff. On the second play of the game, the Golden Eagles fumbled and Badgers safety Dezmen Southward recovered at Tech's 22-yard line. Six plays later, Joel Stave connected with fullback Derek Straus on a 3-yard touchdown pass. It was Straus' first career start and his first career touchdown. After two Tech punts and a Wisconsin punt, the Badgers took over at their own 24-yard line just under seven minutes left in the first quarter. After a Melvin Gordon 5-yard run, Gordon ripped off a 65-yard run and was pushed out-of-bounds at the Golden Eagles 6-yard line. The very next play, Joel Stave hit Jared Abbrederis with a 6-yard touchdown pass giving the Badgers a 14–0 lead. The first quarter end after a Tech punt and the Badgers driving into Tech territory. At the start of the second quarter, the Badgers got down to the Golden Eagles 37-yard line but Joel Stave threw an interception that was returned to Tech's 39-yard line. After a Tech punt, a Wisconsin punt and another Tech punt, the Badgers took over at their own 48-yard line. It only took Wisconsin three plays to drive 52 yards and score on a 37-yard touchdown run by Melvin Gordon stretching the lead to 21. After a Tech punt and Wisconsin penalty on the punt return, the Badgers were backed up at their own 6-yard line with 1:49 left until halftime. The Badgers put together an impressive 11-play 94-yard scoring drive that only took one minute and 37 seconds. Joel Stave was 10–10 passing during the drive and capped the drive with a 6-yard touchdown pass to tight end Brian Wozniak. The Golden Eagles then took the kickoff to their own 19-yard line and took a knee on the final play of the half with the Badgers leading 28–0.

The second half started with the Badgers receiving the kickoff. Wisconsin put together a scoring drive using 12 plays to go 76 yards. The drive was closed out by a James White 2-yard touchdown run but kicker Kyle French missed the extra point; the Badgers led, 34–0. Punt by Tech, punt by Wisconsin and punt by Tech again. The Badgers took over at their own 20-yard line and got to Tech's 42-yard line as the third quarter came to a close. Wisconsin then turned the ball over on downs. The Badgers just looking to run the clock down, true freshman running back Corey Clement eight times on the next drive and scored on a 1-yard touchdown run extending the Wisconsin led to 41–0. On the next Tech drive, Badgers redshirt freshman safety Leo Musso got his first career interception. On the very next play, Corey Clement scampered 75 yards for his second touchdown of the game. After a Tech turnover-on-downs, a Wisconsin missed field goal, the Golden Eagles ran the clock out and the Badgers start the season 2–0 after a 48–0 victory over Tennessee Tech.

Game notes

- The Badgers recorded back-to-back shutouts to open the season for the first time since opening the 1958 season with a 20–0 win at Miami (Fla.) and a 50–0 win over Marquette. The last time UW recorded two shutouts in the same season was 1998 with a 45–0 vs. Ohio on September 12 and a 31–0 win at Iowa on October 24. The last Big Ten team to open the season with consecutive shutouts was Ohio State in 1963 when it beat Texas A&M, 17–0, and Indiana, 21–0
- Dating back to the 2013 Rose Bowl, UW has not allowed a touchdown in its last 11 quarters.
- Head coach Gary Andersen is just the third coach in the modern era (since 1946) of UW history to begin his career 2–0. The other two coaches were Dave McClain (1978) and Bret Bielema (2006).
- UW allowed just 113 total yards on defense, equaling the ninth-lowest total in school history and the Badgers’ best effort since giving up 99 to Northern Illinois (October 20, 2007).
- Wisconsin has won its last 26 games when rushing for more than 230 yards.
- After having only one game with three 100-yard rushers heading into the 2012 Big Ten Championship Game, the Badgers have had three 100-yard rushers in three of their past four games.
- UW has had at least two 100-yard rushers in six of the last 10 games.
- After the game, Gordon now has 1,003 career rushing yards on 104 carries for a career average per carry of 9.6.
- Senior WR Jared Abbrederis caught a 6-yard touchdown pass in the first quarter. It was his third touchdown reception of the season and 19th of his career. That ties him with Jonathan Orr and Al Toon for third all-time in UW history. Lee Evans is the school's all-time leader with 27. With a career-high eight receptions in the game, Abbrederis moved into fifth place on UW's career receptions list (134), passing Chris Chambers and Al Toon.
- Playing in his 37th career game, senior TE Brian Wozniak caught his first career TD pass, hauling in a 6-yard scoring strike late in the first half.
- Playing in his 42nd career game, senior LB Conor O’Neill made his first career start. O’Neill tallied a career-high nine tackles and 1.5 tackles for loss.

Statistical leaders

- Rushing: Corey Clement – 13 Car, 149 Yds, 2 TDs
- Passing: Joel Stave – 24/28, 219 Yds, three touchdowns, 1 INT
- Receiving: Jared Abbrederis – 8 Rec, 62 Yds, 1 TD
- Defense: Conor O'Neill – 9 Tkls, 1.5 TFL

=== At Arizona State ===
#18 Wisconsin at Arizona State

Team	1	2	3	4	Total
#18 Badgers	0	14	7	9	30
• Sun Devils	3	10	6	13	32

- Date: September 14
- Location: Sun Devil Stadium
  Tempe, AZ
- Game start: 9:30 p.m. CST
- Elapsed time: 3:30
- Game attendance: 66,155
- Game weather: Clear, 98 °F (37 °C), Wind: N 8 MPH
- Referee: Jack Folliard
- TV announcers (ESPN): Dave Pasch and Brian Griese

Scoring summary
1	04:08	Arizona State	Zane Gonzalez 34-yard field goal	Arizona State 3–0
2	13:47	Wisconsin	Jacob Pedersen 2-yard pass from Joel Stave (Kyle French kick)	Wisconsin 7–3
2	12:53	Wisconsin	Beau Allen fumble recovery in end zone (Kyle French kick)	Wisconsin 14–3
2	09:21	Arizona State	Marion Grice 1-yard run (Zane Gonzalez kick)	Wisconsin 14–10
2	00:29	Arizona State	Zane Gonzalez 19-yard field goal	Wisconsin 14–13
3	14:42	Wisconsin	Melvin Gordon 80-yard run (Kyle French kick)	Wisconsin 21–13
3	00:47	Arizona State	Marion Grice 1-yard run (Taylor Kelly pass failed)	Wisconsin 21–19
4	13:30	Wisconsin	Kyle French 34-yard field goal	Wisconsin 24–19
4	11:40	Arizona State	Marion Grice 2-yard run (Taylor Kelly pass failed)	Arizona State 25–24
4	08:50	Arizona State	Marion Grice 12-yard run (Zane Gonzalez kick)	Arizona State 32–24
4	11:40	Wisconsin	Melvin Gordon 1-yard run (Joel Stave pass failed)	Arizona State 32–30

The Badgers' first road game of the 2013 season was against the Arizona State Sun Devils. The Badgers were 1–2 all-time vs. the Sun Devils and Wisconsin won the last meeting, 20–19, on September 10, 2010, in Madison.

The Badgers first road game of the season was a hot one as the game time temperature was 98 degrees. Arizona State's opening drive took them down to the Wisconsin 3-yard line but on fourth and two the Sun Devils went for it but failed. Both offenses struggled for most of the first quarter until the Sun Devils kicked a 34-yard field goal with 4:08 left in the first quarter. The Badgers then put a 10-play 73-yard drive together that took 5:22 and into the second quarter. The Badgers capped that nice drive with a 2-yard touchdown pass from QB Joel Stave to TE Jacob Pedersen. On the next drive, the Sun Devils had a three-and-out. Arizona State attempted to punt the ball but because of a bad snap, Wisconsin's DT Beau Allen recovered the ball in the end zone for a touchdown giving the Badgers a 14–3 lead. Arizona State answered right back with a 10-play 75-yard scoring drive capped by a 2-yard touchdown run by RB Marion Grice. The Sun Devils added a 19-yard field goal before the half cutting the Wisconsin lead to 14–13.

The start of the second half had the Badgers starting at their own 20-yard line. On the first play, Badgers RB Melvin Gordon lined up as a wide receiver and went in motion taking the jet sweep handoff 80-yards for a touchdown. This gave the Badgers a 21–13 lead. Arizona State the scored before the end of the third quarter on a Marion Grice 1-yard touchdown run but the 2-point attempt failed. On the next drive, Wisconsin extended their lead 24–19 with a 34-yard field goal by K Kyle French. Arizona State took the lead less than two minutes later on a Marion Grice 2-yard touchdown run but again failed on the 2-point try giving the Sun Devils a 25–24 lead. After a Badgers punt, the Sun Devils added to their lead with a 12-yard touchdown run by Marion Grice, his fourth touchdown of the night. Arizona State led 32–24 with 8:50 left to go in the game. The Badgers scored on their next drive chewing up over five minutes as Melvin Gordon scored on a 1-yard touchdown run. The Badgers attempted the 2-point conversion to try to tie the game but Joel Stave's pass was incomplete as the Sun Devils held on to a 32–30 lead with less than four minutes remaining in the game. Arizona State could not run out the clock as they got to about midfield where they were forced to punt. Wisconsin got the ball back at their own 17-yard line with 1:36 and the Badgers were out of timeouts. On third and four at their own 23-yard line, Joel Stave connected with WR Jeff Duckworth for a 51-yard catch and run that put the Badgers at the Sun Devils 26-yard line.

==== Controversial last play of the game ====
An ESPN camera angle of Stave's kneel from the Wisconsin endzone.

After a couple more completions, the Badgers had the ball at the Sun Devil 13-yard line for 1st and 10. The Badgers were in possession of the football with 18 seconds left, hoping to kick a game-winning field goal. Upon the hike quarterback Joel Stave knelt in the middle of the field to center the ball for their kicker. Stave then placed the ball quickly on the ground after the play was blown dead by the referee. Replays showed that Stave did get his knee down for a brief second; however, Arizona State believed that it was a fumble, and ASU Anthony Jones dove on top of the ball, with the game clock running. At this point Badgers players signalled to the officials, pointing out the delay of game penalty by ASU due to Anthony being top of the football. Umpire Jack Folliard motioned to Stave acknowledging his knee, however the rest of the officiating crew allegedly did not see this signal. The umpire then spotted the ball after a significant delay, but told the Wisconsin offensive line to wait to line up, even though the clock continued to run. Finally, with approximately 2 seconds remaining, the umpire rushed behind the defensive line as Wisconsin tried to run a play to spike the ball and stop the clock but the clock reached zero before the ball was snapped and the game was over.

Initially after the game ASU coach Todd Graham stated "The quarterback put the ball on the ground while he was still standing up, he hadn't been tackled," and "So that should have been a turnover. That should have ended the game." And after watching the footage after the game he acknowledged the officiating error when he stated "You win or you lose. We won and let's move onto the next deal. Obviously, that was a very unusual deal."

The next day saw sports commentators and articles who reported on the "bizarre end" of the game in Tempe. Some even stated that Stave's knee did not touch the ground or that he crouched. This was later countered by other sports commentators, notably columnist Dennis Dodd of CBS Sports that the NCAA handbook states that one simply has to assimilate a kneeling motion.

Ultimately the Pac-12 reprimanded the officiating crew two days after the game ended, deeming that the officials had not acted with enough urgency during the end of the game. Pac-12 Commissioner Larry Scott made a statement when announcing the reprimand; "After a thorough review, we have determined that the officials fell short of the high standard in which the Pac-12 games should be managed. We will continue to work with all our officials to ensure this type of situation never occurs again."

Game notes

- Arizona State's touchdown in the second quarter broke a string of 12 straight quarters (dating back to last year's Rose Bowl) that Wisconsin's defense had not surrendered a TD.
- The game time temperature of 98 degrees ties for the warmest temperature for a Badgers game in history. The other 98-degree game was at UNLV on September 8, 2007.
- Sophomore RB Melvin Gordon scored on an 80-yard run on the first offensive play of the second half. He now has a 60+ yard run in four of his last five games, and has seven career runs of longer than 45 yards.
- Senior TE Jacob Pedersen's 2-yard touchdown reception was his first of the season and the 15th of his career. That ties him with Pat Richter and Lee DeRamus for ninth on UW's all-time list.

Statistical leaders

- Rushing: Melvin Gordon – 16 Car, 193 Yds, 2 TDs
- Passing: Joel Stave – 15/30, 187 Yds, TD
- Receiving: Jared Abbrederis – 6 Rec, 87 Yds
- Defense: Chris Borland – 10 Tkls, TFL

=== Purdue ===
Purdue at Wisconsin

Team	1	2	3	4	Total
Boilermakers	0	10	0	0	10
• Badgers	14	10	10	7	41

- Date: September 21
- Location: Camp Randall Stadium
  Madison, WI
- Game start: 2:30 CST
- Elapsed time: 3:10
- Game attendance: 80,772
- Game weather: Overcast, 58 °F (14 °C), Wind: NW 10 MPH
- Referee: John O'Neill
- TV announcers (ABC): Mike Patrick and Ed Cunningham

Scoring summary
1	04:25	Wisconsin	Melvin Gordon 5-yard run (Kyle French kick)	Wisconsin 7–0
1	00:43	Wisconsin	James White 70-yard run (Kyle French kick)	Wisconsin 14–0
2	11:59	Purdue	Rob Henry 22-yard run (Paul Griggs kick)	Wisconsin 14–7
2	09:44	Purdue	Paul Griggs 24-yard field goal	Wisconsin 14–10
2	07:13	Wisconsin	Melvin Gordon 27-yard run (Kyle French kick)	Wisconsin 21–10
2	00:18	Wisconsin	Kyle French 32-yard field goal	Wisconsin 24–10
3	12:05	Wisconsin	Melvin Gordon 15-yard run (Kyle French kick)	Wisconsin 31–10
3	03:13	Wisconsin	Kyle French 27-yard field goal	Wisconsin 34–10
4	14:56	Wisconsin	Corey Clement 5-yard run (Kyle French kick)	Wisconsin 41–10

The Badgers first conference game of the 2013 season is against Purdue. The Badgers led the all-time series 43–29–8. The Badgers won the last meeting on October 13, 2012, 38–14 in West Lafayette.

The 2013 Big Ten season kicked off with the Purdue Boilermakers squaring off with the Wisconsin Badgers. Both teams started off a little slow as they exchanged punts on their first possessions. After another Purdue punt the Badgers took over at their own 5-yard line. Just 8 plays and 95 yards later, Wisconsin got on the board first with a RB Melvin Gordon 5-yard touchdown run. After another Boilermakers three-and-out, the Badgers struck again as RB James White scored on 70-yard touchdown run. At the end of the first quarter the Badgers led 14–0. Purdue then got on the board on a broken play where QB Rob Henry scrambled for a 22-yard touchdown run. On the next Wisconsin drive, QB Joel Stave's pass was intercepted by CB Ricardo Allen and returned to the Wisconsin 10-yard line. The Badgers defense was able to hold the Boilermakers to a field goal to make the score 14–10 Wisconsin. The Badgers then marched right down the field and scored on a Milevin Gordon 27-yard touchdown run. After another Purdue three-and-out, the Badgers again moved the ball with ease against the Boilermaker defense but stalled out and settled for a 32-yard field goal by K Kyle French. Wisconsin led 24–10 at the half.

Wisconsin opened the second half with the ball and once again marched right down the field and Melvin Gordon scored his third touchdown of the game on a 15-yard run. Wisconsin put some more points on the board late in the third quarter with a 27-yard field goal by Kyle French. On the first play of the fourth quarter, RB Corey Clement scored on a 5-yard touchdown run. With Purdue unable to move the ball and Wisconsin just running the clock down, the game was over by a score of 41–10. Wisconsin stuffed the stats sheet as they out gained Purdue 546 yards to 180 yards. Wisconsin out rushed Purdue by a clip of 388 yards to 45 yards. Wisconsin had 22 first downs, 10 more than Purdue.

Game notes

- Wisconsin has won eight consecutive games against Purdue, the longest win streak by either team in the history of the series (dates back to 1892).
- UW's 95-yard touchdown drive in the first quarter was its longest since a 97-yard TD drive vs. Northern Illinois on September 17, 2011.
- The Badgers have still not allowed a passing touchdown this season.
- UW's total defense of 180 yards allowed was the team's fewest surrendered in a Big Ten game since limiting Minnesota to 156 total yards on November 12, 2011.
- The Badgers tallied four sacks on the day after recording one total sack in the first three games of the season.
- James White's 70-yard touchdown run in the first quarter was the longest run of his career, surpassing a 69-yard run last year at Indiana (November 10, 2012). He has 11 career runs of 40+ yards and his career average of 6.24 yards per carry is best in UW history (min. 300 rushes).
- James White became the 10th player in Wisconsin history to rush for more than 3,000 yards in his career, moving into 10th place on the UW career list with 3,013 career yards.
- James White leads all active FBS players with 35 career rushing TDs and 36 total TDs. UW is 19–1 when White scores.
- James White rushed for more than 100 yards for the 12th time in his career. He has NEVER rushed for 100 yards in a game by himself. All 12 games have been part of multiple 100-yard rushers for UW. Wisconsin is 12–0 when he rushes for 100 yards or more.
- Melvin Gordon also went over 100 yards rushing, for the fourth time this season and the sixth time in his career. He scored a career-high three touchdowns and has seven rushing TDs on the season. Despite averaging 9.2 yards per carry today, Gordon's career average actually went down to 9.95 yards per carry. Gordon now has 624 rushing yards on the season, surpassing his 2012 total of 621 yards.

Statistical leaders

- Rushing: Melvin Gordon – 16 Car, 147 Yds, three touchdowns
- Passing: Joel Stave – 12/19, 158 Yds, INT
- Receiving: Jared Abbrederis – 7 Rec, 94 Yds
- Defense: Chris Borland – 6 Tkls, PBU

=== At Ohio State ===
#24 Wisconsin at #3 Ohio State

Team	1	2	3	4	Total
#24 Badgers	7	7	0	10	24
• #3 Buckeyes	14	10	7	0	31

- Date: September 28
- Location: Ohio Stadium
  Columbus, OH
- Game start: 7:00 p.m.
- Elapsed time: 3:20
- Game attendance: 105,826
- Game weather: Clear, 70 °F (21 °C), Wind: SE 7 MPH
- Referee: Dan Capron
- TV announcers (ABC): Brent Musburger and Kirk Herbstreit

Scoring summary
1	12:18	Ohio State	Evan Spencer 25-yard pass from Braxton Miller (Drew Basil kick)	Ohio State 7–0
1	03:52	Wisconsin	Jared Abbrederis 36-yard pass from Joel Stave (Kyle French kick)	Tied 7–7
1	00:44	Ohio State	Devin Smith 26-yard pass from Braxton Miller (Drew Basil kick)	Ohio State 14–7
2	04:33	Ohio State	Drew Basil 45-yard field goal	Ohio State 17–7
2	01:30	Wisconsin	Sam Arneson 11-yard pass from Joel Stave (Kyle French kick)	Ohio State 17–14
2	00:01	Ohio State	Corey Brown 40-yard pass from Braxton Miller (Drew Basil kick)	Ohio State 24–14
3	02:18	Ohio State	Corey Brown 1-yard pass from Braxton Miller (Drew Basil kick)	Ohio State 31–14
4	13:47	Wisconsin	James White 17-yard run (Kyle French kick)	Ohio State 31–21
4	02:05	Wisconsin	Kyle French 42-yard field goal	Ohio State 31–24

The Badgers first road conference game of the season is against Ohio State. The Buckeyes have dominated the all-time series against the Badgers with a record of 18–55–5. Ohio State won the last meeting on November 17, 2012, 14–21 in Madison.

The Badgers received the opening kickoff but after a three-and-out, they punted giving the Buckeyes the ball at their own 45-yard line. Four plays later, Ohio State was on the board first with a 25-yard touchdown pass to WR Evan Spencer from QB Braxton Miller. The Badgers and Buckeyes then exchanged punts. The Badgers third drive started at their own 10-yard line. Wisconsin put together an 8 play 90-yard drive that was capped off by a 36-yard touchdown pass to WR Jared Abbrederis from QB Joel Stave, that tied the game at seven. Ohio State answered on the very next drive with a 26-yard touchdown pass to WR Devin Smith from Braxton Miller. The first quarter came to a close with the Buckeyes leading 14–7. On the next drive, Wisconsin got the ball down the Ohio State 11-yard line at the start of the second quarter. The Badgers attempted a 32-yard field goal that was missed by K Kyle French. For most of the second quarter, both team struggled to move the ball but with just under five minutes left in the half, the Buckeyes added to their lead with a 45-yard field goal from K Drew Basil. The Badgers then answered with a minute and a half left until half with an 11-yard touchdown pass to TE Sam Arneson from Joel Stave cutting the Buckeyes led to only three. Ohio State then drove the ball to the Wisconsin 40-yard line. On third down, Braxton Miller threw a deep ball that was under thrown. Wisconsin CB Sojour Shelton had a chance to intercept the ball but dropped it. It was fourth down and with eight seconds left until halftime. Ohio State head coach, Urban Meyer to go for it rather than try a long field goal. Brxtom Miller connected on a 40-yard touchdown pass to WR Corey Brown leaving only one second on the clock. Ohio State led 24–14 at the half.

For almost the entire third quarter, both teams struggled to move the ball. A couple of punts, a turnover on downs by Ohio State and a Wisconsin interception thrown by Joel Stave. Finally, Ohio State scored on a 1-yard touchdown pass to Corey Brown from Braxton Miller with 2:18 left in the third. The Badgers then took over and putting a nice drive together as the third quarter came to an end. On the last play of the third quarter, Badger RB Melvin Gordon was hurt and unable to return to the game. The Badgers would continue driving into Buckeyes territory at the start of the fourth quarter. Wisconsin would score on a 17-yard run by RB James White and getting the Badgers within 10. Three drives and three punts later, the Badgers got the ball back 4:38 left in the game. Wisconsin drove down to the Ohio State 24-yard line but the drive stalled there. On fourth and ten, the Badgers decided to kick a field to try to get within one score. Badgers kicker Kyle French then drilled a 42-yard field goal making the score 31–24. Wisconsin would try a "pooch" onside kick that went out of bounds at the Ohio State 34-yard line. With 2:03 left on the clock, Ohio State was trying to run the clock out. Wisconsin had all three of their timeouts left. Wisconsin stopped Ohio State on three straight runs and forced a punt. The Badgers would get the ball back at their own 10-yard line with 1:29 left in the game and no timeouts. After an incomplete pass on first down, Joel Stave threw a screen pass to James White. White fumbled but Stave would recover the ball for a seven-yard loss. Without any timeouts, the clock ticked down to 43 seconds before the Badgers could get lined up for third and 17. Stave then completed a 13-yard pass to James White bringing up fourth and four. White did not get out of bounds but an Ohio State player was injured stopping the clock. When play resumed, Stave's pass was incomplete on fourth down turning the ball over on downs to Ohio State and giving the Buckeyes a 31–24 victory.

Game notes

- Each of Wisconsin's last 12 losses have come by seven points or fewer. UW has not lost a game by more than a touchdown since a 34–24 loss at Michigan State on October 2, 2010.
- Senior WR Jared Abbrederis had a career-high 207 receiving yards, his eighth career 100-yard receiving game and his second at Ohio Stadium (113 yards in 2011), making him the first UW player with two 100-yard receiving games vs. OSU. It's the first 200-yard receiving performance by a UW player since Lee Evans had a school-record 258 yards vs. Michigan State on November 15, 2003. With his 207 yards tonight, he moved into third place on Wisconsin's career receiving yardage list (2,631) and now trails only Lee Evans (3,468) and Brandon Williams (2,924).
- With his first quarter touchdown reception, Abbrederis joined Evans (27) and Tony Simmons (23) as the only Badgers with at least 20 touchdown receptions in a career.

Statistical leaders

- Rushing: Melvin Gordon – 15 Car, 74 Yds
- Passing: Joel Stave – 20/34, 295 Yds, 2 TDs, INT
- Receiving: Jared Abbrederis – 10 Rec, 207 Yds, TD
- Defense: Chris Borland – 16 Tkls, 0.5 TFL

=== Northwestern ===
#18 Northwestern at Wisconsin

Team	1	2	3	4	Total
#18 Wildcats	3	3	0	0	6
• Badgers	7	14	7	7	35

- Date: October 12
- Location: Camp Randall Stadium
  Madison, WI
- Game start: 2:30 p.m.
- Elapsed time: 3:04
- Game attendance: 81,411
- Game weather: Partly Cloudy, 68 °F (20 °C), Wind: W 9 MPH
- Referee: Jerry McGinn
- TV announcers (ABC): Sean McDonough and Chris Spielman

Scoring summary
1	09:46	Northwestern	Jeff Budzien 25-yard field goal	Northwestern 3–0
1	04:09	Wisconsin	Jared Abbrederis 63-yard pass from Joel Stave (Kyle French kick)	Wisconsin 7–3
2	07:06	Wisconsin	James White 45-yard run (Kyle French kick)	Wisconsin 14–3
2	02:03	Wisconsin	Melvin Gordon 71-yard run (Kyle French kick)	Wisconsin 21–3
2	00:12	Northwestern	Jeff Budzien 43-yard field goal	Wisconsin 21–6
3	10:16	Wisconsin	Jacob Pedersen 1-yard pass from Joel Stave (Jack Russell kick)	Wisconsin 28–6
4	12:29	Wisconsin	Derek Watt 3-yard pass from Joel Stave (Jack Russell kick)	Wisconsin 35–6

Wisconsin returned home to face Northwestern. The Badgers held a commanding all-time lead over the Wildcats with a record of 56–33–6. Wisconsin won the previous meeting on November 27, 2010, 70–23 in Madison.

After a week off, the Badgers returned home for homecoming to face the Northwestern Wildcats. The Wildcats started with the ball. On the fourth play of the game, QB Kain Colter threw and interception to CB Sojour Shelton. The Badgers then took over at their own 36-yard line. On the Badgers second offensive play of the game, WR Jared Abbrederis caught and 11-yard pass but fumbled. The ball was recovered and returned by Northwestern to the Badgers 39-yard line. Northwestern got down to the Wisconsin 3-yard line but they were unable to get into the endzone and had to settle for a 27-yard field goal by K Jeff Budzien to give the Wildcats a 3–0 lead. The next four drives (two by each team) all resulted in punts. On the fifth drive, Wisconsin started at their own 37-yard line. On the first play of the drive, Joel Stave threw a deep pass down the middle to Jared Abbrederis who got behind the defense and scored on a 63-yard touchdown catch giving the Badgers a 7–3 lead. After a Wildcat punt, the Badgers drove into Northwestern territory but Joel Stave was intercepted at the NU 18-yard line. The first quarter ended with the Badgers holding a slight lead, 7–3, Another Northwestern punt gave the ball back to Wisconsin. The Badgers then put together an 11 play 75-yard drive that was capped by a 1-yard touchdown run by RB James White making the score 14–3 Wisconsin. The Wildcats would punt again and the Badgers would then drive to the NU 20-yard line but K Kyle French missed at 38-yard field goal. The Wildcats continued to struggle as RB Venric Mark left the game with and ankle injury and QB Kain Colter was in and out of the game with an ankle injury. Another Northwestern punt and Wisconsin would strike quickly again as the second play of the drive would lead to a touchdown by RB Melvin Gordon on a 71-yard run giving the Badgers a 21–3 advantage. Northwestern would punt and Wisconsin then tried to add to their lead with less than two minutes left until halftime. Joel Stave completed two passes to get into NU territory but his third attempt of the drive was intercepted by NU at their own 16-yard line with 47 second left until half. QB Trevor Siemian would drive NU into field goal range and NU got three points before the half on a 43-yard field goal making the score 21–6 at the half.

The Badgers started the second half with the ball and put together a 10 play scoring drive that ended with a 1-yard touchdown pass to TE Jacob Pedersen giving Wisconsin a commanding 28–6 lead. The remainder of the third quarter would see both teams unable to put anymore points on the board as both teams punters got their work in exchanging five punts (3 for NU and 2 for UW). The Badgers took over at the end of the third quarter and moved the ball into the NU red zone at the start of the fourth quarter. Wisconsin would score on a 3-yard touchdown pass from Joel Stave to FB Derek Watt scoring the final points of the game and making the score 35–6. Another NU punt, their 11th of the game. Northwestern's previous season high for punts in a game was five. Wisconsin would then chew up 8 minutes and 15 seconds before turning the ball over on downs at the Northwestern 30-yard line. The Wildcats got the ball back with only 1:16 left in the game. After a few rushing plays and NU penalty, the game was over with Wisconsin dominating the #18 ranked team in the nation with a 35–6 victory.

Game notes

- Wisconsin held Northwestern to its lowest point total since October 28, 2006, a 17–3 loss at No. 2 Michigan.
- Northwestern had entered today's game having scored at least 30 points in each of its last seven games, the second-longest active streak in the country. The Wildcats had scored at least 10 points in 78 straight games.
- The Badgers are 4–0 at home this season and have outscored their opponents (134–10) this season.
- The Badgers recorded a season-high seven sacks, with seven different players accounting for the sacks. The last time UW had seven sacks as a team was October 18, 2003, in a 26–23 home loss to Purdue.
- Wisconsin allowed just 44 yards rushing. That was Northwestern's fewest rushing yards since September 22, 2007, when it ran for 0 yards in a 58–7 loss to Ohio State. The Wildcats entered today's game averaging 218.4 yards rushing per game.
- The games attendance of 81,411 was the largest crowd at Camp Randall Stadium since October 11, 2008.
- Sophomore FB Derek Watt scored his first career touchdown, catching a 3-yard TD pass in the fourth quarter.

Statistical leaders

- Rushing: Melvin Gordon – 22 Car, 172 Yds, TD
- Passing: Joel Stave – 17/28, 241 Yds, three touchdowns, 2 INTs
- Receiving: Jared Abbrederis – 2 Rec, 74 Yds, TD
- Defense: Chris Borland – 10 Tkls, 1.0 TFL, 1.0 Sack, PBU

=== At Illinois ===
Wisconsin at Illinois

Team	1	2	3	4	Total
• Badgers	21	7	14	14	56
Fighting Illini	0	17	0	15	32

- Date: October 19
- Location: Memorial Stadium
  Champaign, IL
- Game start: 7:00 p.m.
- Elapsed time: 3:11
- Game attendance: 47,362
- Game weather: N/A
- Referee: Mike Cannon
- TV announcers (BTN): Kevin Kugler and Chuck Long

Scoring summary
1	10:33	Wisconsin	James White 2-yard run (Jack Russell kick)	Wisconsin 7–0
1	06:03	Wisconsin	Melvin Gordon 26-yard run (Jack Russell kick)	Wisconsin 14–0
1	05:03	Wisconsin	Brian Wozniak 2-yard pass from Joel Stave (Jack Russell kick)	Wisconsin 21–0
2	10:45	Illinois	Taylor Zalewski 31-yard field goal	Wisconsin 21–3
2	06:38	Illinois	Josh Ferguson 1-yard run (Taylor Zalewski kick)	Wisconsin 21–10
2	01:55	Wisconsin	Melvin Gordon 1-yard run (Jack Russell kick)	Wisconsin 28–10
2	00:45	Illinois	Matt LaCosse 1-yard pass from Aaron Bailey (Taylor Zalewski kick)	Wisconsin 28–17
3	09:55	Wisconsin	James White 3-yard pass from Joel Stave (Jack Russell kick)	Wisconsin 35–17
3	05:58	Wisconsin	Melvin Gordon 13-yard run (Jack Russell kick)	Wisconsin 42–17
4	11:38	Illinois	Nathan Scheelhaase 1-yard run (Jon Davis pass from Tim Russell)	Wisconsin 42–25
4	08:32	Wisconsin	James White 1-yard run (Jack Russell kick)	Wisconsin 49–25
4	02:20	Wisconsin	Corey Clement 5-yard run (Jack Russell kick)	Wisconsin 56–25
4	00:44	Illinois	Spencer Harris 29-yard pass from Reilly O'Toole (Taylor Zalewski kick)	Wisconsin 56–32

The Badgers travel down south to Illinois. The all-time series is deadlocked with a record of 36–36–7. The Badgers won the last meeting on October 6, 2012, 31–14 in Madison.

The Badgers traveled to Champaign, Illinois, looking for their first road win of the season. The Illini started the game with the ball but ended up going backwards on their first drive and were forced to punt. The Badgers took over with great field position at their own 47-yard line. Five plays later, Wisconsin was on the board first with a 2-yard touchdown run by RB James White. After a three-and-out for the Illini, the Badgers struck again this time it was RB Melvin Gordon with a 26-yard touchdown run. On the next Illini drive, QB Nathan Scheelhaase fumbled on the first play of the drive and the Badgers DE Ethan Hemer recovered at the Illinois 8-yard line. Three plays later, the Badgers extended their lead with a 2-yard touchdown pass to TE Brian Wozniak from QB Joel Stave. Back-to-back three-and-outs for both teams gave the ball back to the Illini late in the first quarter. The Illini were driving the ball into Wisconsin territory as the first quarter came to a close, the Badgers leading 21–0. The Illini would continue to move the ball and got down to the Wisconsin 3-yard line but on third down, Nathan Scheelhaase was sacked by LB Derek Landisch. The Illini K Taylor Zalewski kicked a 31-yard field goal and got Illinois on the board. Wisconsin would punt on their next drive and then Illinois responded with a quick 4-play drive that was capped with a 1-yard touchdown run by RB Josh Ferguson. The Badgers would then extend their lead with a 10-play scoring drive with Melvin Gordon punching in a 1-yard touchdown run. Once again, Illinois would score on their next drive with a 1-yard touchdown pass to TE Matt LeCosse from QB Aaron Bailey with less than a minute before half. The Badgers led 28–17 at halftime.

Wisconsin would come out of halftime running and score on the opening drive of the half with a 3-yard pass to James White from Joel Stave. Another three-and-out for the Illini and the Badgers would continue running their "Two-Headed Monster" of Gordon and White. The Badgers would score on a 13-yard run by Melvin Gordon. The Illini would then put together a 13-play 74-yard drive but on fourth and goal at the one yard-line but the Badgers stuffed Illini and took over at their one 1-yard line. The fourth quarter would begin with the Badgers trying to get out of the shadow of their own end zone. They would get the ball out to their own 17-yard line but they would punt the ball back the Illini. The Illini would take advantage of a short field and score on a Nathan Scheelhaase 1-yard touchdown run. The Illini would then convert a 2-point conversion. The Badgers would not let the Illini back in the game as they scored on the next drive with a 1-yard touchdown run by James White. Wisconsin would force a fumble and close out their scoring with a 5-yard touchdown run by RB Corey Clement. With both teams playing their backups, the Illini would score on a 29-yard pass to WR Spencer Harris from QB Reilly O'Toole. The Badgers would then use backup running back Corey Clement to run out the final 44 seconds for a 56–32 victory.

Game notes

- UW has won eight of the last nine meetings with Illinois and now leads the all-time series with the Illini 37–36–7. The win was Wisconsin's first road night victory against a Big Ten team since a 42–24 win at Michigan State on October 26, 2002. UW is now 6–9 all-time on the road at night against Big Ten teams.
- With RB Melvin Gordon going over the 1,000-yard rushing mark for the season, Wisconsin has had at least one 1,000-yard rusher in nine-straight seasons, the longest active streak in the country.
- Sophomore RB Melvin Gordon rushed for at least 140 yards for the sixth time in seven games this season and went over the 1,000-yard mark for the season. That ties P. J. Hill (2006) for the quickest to 1,000 yards rushing for any UW player in a season.
- James White is the seventh player in UW history to score at least 40 touchdowns in a career. He is now tied with John Clay for sixth place on UW's all-time list with 41 career TDs. Wisconsin is 21–2 when White scores at least one touchdown.
- Senior WR Jared Abbrederis caught eight passes for 106 yards, going over the 100-yard receiving plateau for the third time this season and the ninth time in his career.

Statistical leaders

- Rushing: Melvin Gordon – 17 Car, 142 Yds, three touchdowns
- Passing: Joel Stave – 16/21, 189 Yds, 2 TDs
- Receiving: Jared Abbrederis – 8 Rec, 106 Yds
- Defense: Michael Trotter – 9 Tkls, 0.5 TFL, FR, PBU

=== At Iowa ===
#23 Wisconsin at Iowa

Team	1	2	3	4	Total
• #23 Badgers	0	7	7	14	28
Hawkeyes	3	3	3	0	9

- Date: November 2
- Location: Kinnick Stadium
  Iowa City, IA
- Game start: 11:00 a.m.
- Elapsed time: 3:21
- Game attendance: 69,812
- Game weather: Partly Cloudy, 45 °F (7 °C), Wind: NW 13 MPH
- Referee: John O'Neill
- TV announcers (ABC): Sean McDonough and Chris Spielman

Scoring summary
1	06:20	Iowa	Mike Meyer 28-yard field goal	Iowa 3–0
2	04:52	Iowa	Mike Meyer 22-yard field goal	Iowa 6–0
2	01:49	Wisconsin	Jacob Pedersen 44-yard pass from Joel Stave (Jack Russell kick)	Wisconsin 7–6
3	07:34	Wisconsin	Jared Abbrederis 30-yard pass from Joel Stave (Jack Russell kick)	Wisconsin 14–6
3	00:38	Iowa	Mike Meyer 29-yard field goal	Wisconsin 14–9
4	06:29	Wisconsin	James White 11-yard run (Jack Russell kick)	Wisconsin 21–9
4	01:35	Wisconsin	James White 2-yard run (Jack Russell kick)	Wisconsin 28–9

Two straight road games for the Badgers as they faced off against the Hawkeyes. The all-time series is tied at 42–42–2. The Badgers won the last meeting on October 23, 2010, 31–30 in Iowa City.

Just before the game starting middle linebacker Chris Borland was ruled out. The Badgers would start with the ball. On the third play of the game, Wisconsin QB Joel Stave was hit as he attempted a third down pass. The ball fluttered and was off target and was intercepted by Iowa at the Wisconsin 49-yard line. Iowa was unable to capitalize on the turnover as they punted. The Badgers went three-and-out and punted into the wind. The punt traveled 23 yards and the Hawkeyes took over at the Wisconsin 39-yard line. Iowa got down to the Wisconsin 11-yard line but had to settle for a 28-yard field goal by K Mike Meyer. Once again, Wisconsin went three-and-out and punted a 27-yarder into the wind. Wisconsin's defense forced an Iowa three-and-out; Iowa would do the same and then again the Badgers. The first quarter would end with Iowa leading 3–0 in a defensive struggle. The Badgers would start the second quarter at their own 8-yard line. They would finally pick up their first first down of the game on the drive but would later punt. The Hawkeyes would put together a nice 13-play drive that chewed up almost six and a half minutes and got down to the Wisconsin 4-yard line but again Iowa would have to settle for a 22-yard field goal. The Badgers would answer with a 44-yard touchdown pass to TE Jacob Pedersen from Joel Stave. The Hawkeyes would get the ball with less than two minutes until the half. They would be forced to punt and Wisconsin took over at their own 42-yard line with 1:17 left until half. The Badgers got to the Iowa 36-yard line with one second left. Wisconsin K Jack Russell came out to attempt a 54-yard field goal with the wind at his back. Just before the ball was snapped, Iowa called a timeout but Russell kicked the ball anyway and the kick would have been good. Iowa would use another two timeout to try to "ice" the kicker. It worked as Russell's attempt was short and the Badgers led 7–6 at halftime.

Iowa started the second half with the ball but they would punt the ball to Wisconsin after three plays. Wisconsin would do the same as they punted the ball back to Iowa. The Hawkeyes drive the ball to the Badgers 35-yard line. On fourth-and-one, Iowa decided to go for it and failed as the Badgers defense stuffed the run up the middle. Still the Badgers struggled to move the ball on the Iowa defense and punted it back to the Hawkeyes. The Wisconsin punt was downed at the Iowa 1-yard line. On the first play, Iowa tried to pass out of their own end zone. The pass was intercepted by CB Darius Hillary at the Iowa 20-yard line. During that play Iowa starting QB Jake Rudock was injured and would not return to the game. On the very next play, Joel Stave connected with WR Jared Abbrederis on a 20-yard touchdown pass. Jared Abbrederis was injured on the touchdown catch and he would not return to the game. Iowa's backup QB C. J. Beathard would come in but failed to pick up a first down so they punted. Wisconsin tried to move the ball but two holding penalties forced them to punt. Wisconsin punting into the wind again forced a 23-yard punt and Iowa took over at their own 40-yard line. Iowa would again get into the red zone at the Wisconsin 12-yard line but once again they were forced to settle for a 29-yard field goal. Wisconsin would have the ball as the third quarter came to a close with the Badgers holding onto a slight 14–9 lead. The Badgers got to midfield put punted the ball back to the Hawkeyes. The Badgers would get pressure on the Iowa backup QB and forced a bad throw that hit off an Iowa helmet, popped up in the air and was intercepted by DE Pat Muldoon at the Iowa 25-yard line. Three plays later, RB James White scored on an 11-yard touchdown run. The Badgers defense forced another Hawkeye punt. Wisconsin took over at its own 24-yard line and on the second play of the drive, James White broke loose for a 59-yard run down to the Iowa 17. The Iowa defense tried to hold Wisconsin but finally James White punched it in with a 2-yard touchdown run giving the Badgers a 28–9 lead. With about and three and a half minutes left in the game, Iowa again drove into the Wisconsin red zone but failed on fourth down and the Badgers closed out the game with a kneel-down.

Game notes

- With its sixth win of the season, the Badgers were bowl eligible for the 12th-consecutive season. That is the longest active streak in the Big Ten.
- With the win, Wisconsin pulled ahead in the all-time series with Iowa and now leads 43–42–1.
- At 19 points, the Badgers posted their largest margin of victory over Iowa since a 41–3 win in 1999. It was UW's largest win over the Hawkeyes in Iowa City since a 31–0 victory in 1998.
- This is the fourth time this season UW has held its opponent without a touchdown.
- Wisconsin's last 10 wins have come by at least 19 points.
- The Badgers scored a pair of rushing touchdowns by senior RB James White. Iowa had allowed just two rushing touchdowns through its first eight games of the season.
- Senior TE Jacob Pedersen caught a 44-yard touchdown pass in the second quarter, his 17th career touchdown reception. That moves him into seventh place all-time on Wisconsin's career touchdown receptions list.
- White finished with 132 rushing yards, the 14th 100-yard rushing game of his career. It is the first time in his career that White was UW's lone 100-yard rusher in a game. In each of his previous 13 100-yard games, the Badgers boasted at least two 100-yard rushers. White passed 1954 Heisman Trophy winner Alan Ameche (3,345) for ninth all-time at UW in rushing with 3,375 yards for his career.

Statistical leaders

- Rushing: James White – 19 Car, 132 Yds, 2 TDs
- Passing: Joel Stave – 11/19, 144 Yds, 2 TDs, INT
- Receiving: Jacob Pedersen – 3 Rec, 73 Yds, TD
- Defense: Michael Trotter – 9 Tkls, 1.5 TFL

=== BYU ===
BYU at #22 Wisconsin

Team	1	2	3	4	Total
Cougars	3	0	7	7	17
• #22 Badgers	7	10	3	7	27

- Date: November 9
- Location: Camp Randall Stadium
  Madison, WI
- Game start: 2:30 p.m.
- Elapsed time: 3:10
- Game attendance: 80,191
- Game weather: Overcast, 51 °F (11 °C), Wind: W 14 MPH
- Referee: Dave Witvoet
- TV announcers (ESPN): Bob Wischusen and Rod Gilmore

Scoring summary
1	10:20	Wisconsin	James White 4-yard run (Jack Russell kick)	Wisconsin 7–0
1	02:40	BYU	Justin Sorensen 31-yard field goal	Wisconsin 7–3
2	03:34	Wisconsin	Jack Russell 38-yard field goal	Wisconsin 10–3
2	00:14	Wisconsin	James White 5-yard pass from Joel Stave (Jack Russell kick)	Wisconsin 17–3
3	10:36	Wisconsin	Jack Russell 26-yard field goal	Wisconsin 20–3
3	09:04	BYU	Cody Hoffman 34-yard pass from Taysom Hill (Justin Sorensen kick)	Wisconsin 20–10
4	13:51	Wisconsin	James White 14-yard run (Jack Russell kick)	Wisconsin 27–10
4	03:12	BYU	Cody Hoffman 5-yard pass from Taysom Hill (Justin Sorensen kick)	Wisconsin 27–17

The Badgers then face a rare non-conference opponent, the Cougars, in the second half of the season. The Badgers and Cougars have only played once on September 20, 1980, and the Cougars won 3–28 in Madison.

Wisconsin started the game with the ball. The Badgers put together an 11–play drive that ended with Wisconsin striking first with a 4-yard touchdown run by RB James White. The next two drives (one by each team) would all result in three–and–outs. The Badgers would get the ball back after an interception by quarterback turned safety Tanner McEvoy. BYU would take over after a catch and fumble by WR Kenzel Doe. BYU then put together their own nice 13–play drive but they would have to settle for a field goal. A Wisconsin three–and–out would give the ball back to BYU and the first quarter came to a close with Wisconsin leading 7–3. The Cougars would get the ball to the Badgers 32-yard line but they would put the ball rather than attempt a long field goal into the wind. Two plays later, the Badgers would again turn the ball over after an interception by QB Joel Stave. The Cougars would have very good field possession after the interception at their own 40-yard line but the Badgers defense would force a punt. Wisconsin would get down to the BYU 20-yard line but stalled there and settle for a 38-yard field goal by K Jack Russell, the first field goal of his career. The Badgers defense forced BYU to a three–and–out and Wisconsin would score just before halftime on a 5-yard touchdown pass to James White from Joel Stave. Wisconsin led 17–3 at the half.

BYU would start the second half with the ball but once again the Wisconsin defense would force a three–and–out. After a nice punt return by Kenzel Doe, the Badgers would start the drive at the Cougars 23-yard line. The BYU defense would hold the Badgers to a 26-yard field goal and giving Wisconsin a 20–3 lead. The Cougars would answer right back quick 6–play drive capped by a 34-yard touchdown pass to WR Cody Hoffman from QB Taysom Hill. A couple of stalled drive by both teams but Wisconsin would get the ball at their own 8-yard line after a 73-yard punt by BYU and were moving the ball into BYU territory as their quarter came to an end. The Badgers would score just over a minute into the fourth quarter on a 14-yard touchdown run by James White giving the Badgers a 27–10 lead. The next four drive (two by each team) would all result in punts. BYU would score after a 9–play 57-yard drive capped by a 5-yard touchdown pass to Cody Hoffman from Taysom Hill. BYU then forced the Badgers to punt and the Cougars would get the ball back with 2:12 left in the game and down by 10 points. BYU got down to the Wisconsin 25-yard line but ran out of time, Wisconsin won 27–17.

Game notes

- Wisconsin improved to 60–6 (90.9 percent) at home since the start of the 2004 season, the third-best record in the nation over that span, trailing Boise State and Oklahoma.
- UW has now won 29 consecutive home games against non-conference opponents, dating back to September 13, 2003. That is the second–longest active streak in the FBS, trailing only LSU (40).
- The Badgers improved to 5–0 at home this season and have outscored their five opponents by a combined score of 196–33.
- BYU entered the game averaging 258.8 yards rushing per game. Wisconsin limited the Cougars to 163 yards on the ground, their second–lowest total of the season (low was 159 vs. Utah State on October 4).
- Senior RB James White scored three touchdowns today, his fifth career game with at least three TDs. He now has 46 career touchdowns, which ties him with Billy Marek behind only Montee Ball (83) and Ron Dayne (71) on Wisconsin's all–time list.
- With eight catches during the game, senior WR Jared Abbrederis moved into second place on Wisconsin's career receptions list. He now has 178 career catches, trailing only Lee Evans (202).
- Sophomore K Jack Russell made the first two field goals of his career, a 38–yarder in the second quarter and a 26–yarder in the third quarter. He had been 0–4 prior to that kick. They were Wisconsin's first made field goals since Kyle French made a 42–yarder at Ohio State on September 28.

Statistical leaders

- Rushing: James White – 23 Car, 150 Yds, 2 TDs
- Passing: Joel Stave – 23/31, 196 Yds, TD, INT
- Receiving: Jared Abbrederis – 8 Rec, 67 Yds
- Defense: Chris Borland – 13 Tkls, 2.5 TFL, 2 Sacks

=== Indiana ===
Indiana at #20 Wisconsin

Team	1	2	3	4	Total
Hoosiers	0	0	3	0	3
• #20 Badgers	20	7	10	14	51

- Date: November 16
- Location: Camp Randall Stadium
  Madison, WI
- Game start: 11:00 a.m.
- Elapsed time: 2:54
- Game attendance: 77,849
- Game weather: Light drizzle, 48 °F (9 °C), Wind: S 18 MPH
- Referee: Jerry McGinn
- TV announcers (ESPN2): Bob Wischusen and Rod Gilmore

Scoring summary
1	13:49	Wisconsin	James White 93-yard run (Jack Russell kick)	Wisconsin 7–0
1	12:01	Wisconsin	Melvin Gordon 1-yard run (Jack Russell kick)	Wisconsin 14–0
1	06:25	Wisconsin	Jack Russell 31-yard field goal	Wisconsin 17–0
1	01:59	Wisconsin	Jack Russell 36-yard field goal	Wisconsin 20–0
2	05:28	Wisconsin	Jared Abbrederis 32-yard run (Jack Russell kick)	Wisconsin 27–0
3	12:30	Wisconsin	Jack Russell 26-yard field goal	Wisconsin 30–0
3	07:35	Indiana	Mitch Ewald 23-yard field goal	Wisconsin 30–3
3	00:10	Wisconsin	Jared Abbrederis 49-yard run (Jack Russell kick)	Wisconsin 37–3
4	11:33	Wisconsin	Corey Clement 19-yard run (Jack Russell kick)	Wisconsin 44–3
4	02:09	Wisconsin	Corey Clement 21-yard run (Jack Russell kick)	Wisconsin 51–3

Another home game and the return to Big Ten play as the Badgers face the Hoosiers. Wisconsin has owned the all-time series with a record of 39–18–2 against Indiana. The Badgers won the last meeting on November 10, 2012, 62–14 in Bloomington.

Indiana would start the game with the ball and move into Badgers territory. Indiana QB Nate Sudfeld then threw a deep pass that was intercepted by CB Sojourn Shelton at the Wisconsin 7-yard line. On the first play from scrimmage for the Badgers, RB James White ran 93 yards for the touchdown. On Indiana's second possession, a fumbled snap was recovered by OLB Brendan Kelly at the Indiana 14-yard line. The Badgers would score three plays later on a Melvin Gordon 1-yard touchdown run. Indiana was forced to punt and Wisconsin would settle for a 31-yard field goal by K Jack Russell. Another punt for the Hoosiers and the Badgers would again have to settle for a field goal, this time it was a 36-yard field goal by Jack Russell. Indiana would have the ball near midfield as the first quarter came to a close with Wisconsin leading 20–0. Indiana's drive stalled at about midfield and gave the ball back to Wisconsin. The Badgers would then be forced to punt for the first time of the game. After an Indiana three–and–out, Wisconsin took over at their own 7-yard line. The Badgers put together a very nice 9 plays 93 yard scoring drive that was capped with a 32-yard touchdown run by WR Jared Abbrederis. The Hoosier and Badgers would exchange punts as Indiana then closed out the half by running out the clock. The Badgers led 27–0 at halftime.

Wisconsin started the half with the ball and a big 61-yard completion to TE Jacob Pedersen from QB Joel Stave would get the Badgers down to the Hoosiers 2-yard line. Wisconsin was unable to get the ball into the endzone and they would have to settle for a 26-yard field goal by Jack Russell. Indiana then put together their best drive of the game, a 14 play, 70-yard drive but were unable to get into the endzone so they were forced to kick a 23-yard field goal. Once again both team exchanged punts. The Badgers got the ball back with less than a minute left in the third quarter. On the second play of the drive, Jared Abbrederis took a jet sweep handoff and ran 49 yards for his second rushing touchdown of the game. The Badgers led 37–3 by the end of the third quarter. A three–and–out for the Hoosiers would then lead to another scoring drive for the Badgers, a 19-yard touchdown run by RB Corey Clement. Indiana's next drive would again stall right at midfield so they punted the ball back to Wisconsin. The Badgers started the drive at their own 17-yard line and they would use 9 plays (all running plays) to go 83 yards and score on a 21-yard touchdown run by Corey Clement. The Hoosier got the ball with less than two minutes left in the game. They ran the ball four times as time expired. Badgers would win 51–3.

Game notes

- Wisconsin has won nine straight games against Indiana, outscoring the Hoosiers 467–136 in those games. UW has averaged 346.0 rushing yards per game in those nine wins. It is the longest win streak by either team in the series (dates back to 1907).
- Indiana entered the game averaging 43.1 points and 527.1 yards of total offense per game, both in the top 10 in the country. The Badgers limited them to 3 points and 224 yards.
- UW entered the game tied for the national lead, allowing opponents to score touchdowns on just 39.1 percent of its red zone trips. After IU went 0-for-1 on TDs inside the red zone, the Badgers have allowed just nine touchdowns on 24 red zone trips (37.5%).
- The Badgers rushed for 554 yards on 50 carries (11.1 ypc.), the second-best total in school history and the most by an FBS team this season.
- UW had seven rushes of at least 30 yards during the game. That's more than 73 FBS teams had on the season entering the game Saturday.
- Wisconsin finished the game with 676 yards of total offense, second-highest total in school history and the 17th time the Badgers have gone over 600 yards. Five of those performances have been again Indiana, including three times in the last six meetings. UW's school record of 705 total yards came vs. Indiana in 1999.
- With a 93-yard touchdown run on the Badgers’ first play from scrimmage, senior RB James White went over 1,000 yards for the season. He finished with a career-high 205 yards on the day and has 1,156 on the season. He is the eighth player in school history to have multiple 1,000-yard rushing seasons as he ran for 1,052 yards as a true freshman in 2010.
- White's 93-yard run is the longest in Wisconsin history and just the third run of at least 90 yards in school history. The others were a 91-yarder by Tom Bringham vs. Western Michigan on September 21, 1963, and a 90-yard run by David Gilreath at Indiana on November 8, 2008. It was the second-longest play from scrimmage in school history, surpassed only by a 99-yard touchdown pass from Jim Sorgi to Lee Evans vs. Akron on September 6, 2003.
- White and Melvin Gordon have both surpassed the 1,000-yard rushing plateau. This is the second time in school history UW has had two 1,000-yard rushers in the same season. White and John Clay both went over 1,000 yards in 2010.
- White has now scored 47 touchdowns in his career, taking over third place in Wisconsin history. He trails only the NCAA's all-time leader, Montee Ball (83) and college football's all-time leading rusher, Ron Dayne (71). White's 47 TDs also rank ninth all-time among Big Ten players.
- White also moved past Billy Marek and into fifth on UW's career rushing list with 3,727 yards.
- Senior WR Jared Abbrederis scored the first two rushing touchdowns of his career, scoring on a 32-yard run in the third quarter and a 49-yard run in the third quarter. He now has 24 career TDs, including eight this season. He finished the game with three rushes for 86 yards.
- Melvin Gordon, James White and Corey Clement all surpassed the 100-yard rushing mark in the game. This marked the fourth time in school history and the second time this season that the Badgers had three 100-yard rushers in the same game. White finished with 205 yards, Gordon 146 yards and Clement 108 yards.

Statistical leaders

- Rushing: James White – 20 Car, 205 Yds, TD
- Passing: Joel Stave – 7/15, 122 Yds
- Receiving: Jacob Pedersen – 3 Rec, 92 Yds
- Defense: Chris Borland – 10 Tkls, 1.5 TFL

=== At Minnesota ===
#17 Wisconsin at #23 Minnesota

Team	1	2	3	4	Total
• #17 Badgers	3	10	7	0	20
#23 Golden Gophers	0	7	0	0	7

- Date: November 23
- Location: TCF Bank Stadium
  Minneapolis, MN
- Game start: 2:30 p.m.
- Elapsed time: 3:08
- Game weather: Clear and brisk, 18 °F (−8 °C), wind: NW 13 MPH
- Referee: Mike Cannon
- TV announcers (ESPN): Brian Griese and Dave Pasch

Scoring summary
1	11:11	Wisconsin	Jack Russell 31-yard field goal	Wisconsin 3–0
2	13:29	Minnesota	Aaron Hill 39-yard interception return (Chris Hawthorne kick)	Minnesota 7–3
2	03:14	Wisconsin	James White 1-yard run (Jack Russell kick)	Wisconsin 10–7
2	00:03	Wisconsin	Jack Russell 20-yard field goal	Wisconsin 13–7
3	07:55	Wisconsin	Jared Abbrederis 2-yard pass from Joel Stave (Jack Russell kick)	Wisconsin 20–7

The longest rivalry in Division I FBS is Wisconsin vs. Minnesota. The Golden Gophers have a slight all-time series lead over the Badgers, 56–58–8. The Badgers won the last meeting on October 20, 2012, 38–13 in Madison.

The Golden Gophers started the game with the ball on a chilly afternoon in Minneapolis, Minnesota. The stout Badgers defense would get right to work forcing a three–and–out. Wisconsin's first offensive play was a 49-yard run by RB James White down to the Minnesota 12-yard line. The Gopher defense would hold up and force Wisconsin to kick a 31-yard field goal by K Jack Russell. Minnesota would then punt again after only three offensive plays. Wisconsin moved the ball to about midfield but were forced to punt. The Golden Gophers took over at their own 4-yard line and picked up a couple of first downs but once again had to punt. The Badgers then had their own three–and–out and punting the ball back to the Gophers who took over right around midfield as the first quarter came to a close. On the first play of the second quarter, Minnesota QB Philip Nelson threw a 9-yard pass to WR Maxx Williams but the ball the stripped by Badgers S Nate Hammon and recovered by LB Derek Landisch at the Badgers 32-yard line. Three plays later, Wisconsin QB Joel Stave threw and interception to Gophers CB Aaron Hill who returned it 39 yards for a touchdown. Wisconsin would move the ball into Minnesota territory but were forced to punt it back to Minnesota. The Golden Gophers were putting together a nice drive but on third down and 11 from the Wisconsin 36-yard line, LB Brendan Kelly hit the Gophers QB Nelson and forced a fumble that was recovered by Badgers LB Chris Borland. Five plays later, Wisconsin was in the end zone with a 1-yard touchdown run by James White. The Badgers defense moved the Gophers offense back and forced a three–and–out. The Badgers then used a 12 play drive and got down to the Minnesota 2-yard line but were forced to kick a 20-yard field goal by Jack Russell. The Gophers would take a knee to close out the half, Wisconsin led 13–7.

The second half started with the Badgers marching 83 yards on the Gophers and scoring on a 2-yard touchdown pass to WR Jared Abbrederis from Joel Stave. On the Gophers first play of the second half, RB David Cobb would stripped by Chris Borland and Borland would also recover the fumble. The Badgers had the ball at the Golden Gophers 26-yard line but could not get in the end zone. They tried a 38-yard field goal but missed. Minnesota would punt after unable to pick up a first down. The Badgers took over with very good field possession but would also punt the ball back to Minnesota. The Gophers picked up one first down but the Badgers defense again held firm and forced a punt that was returned by Jared Abbrederis down to the Gophers 33-yard line as the third quarter came to a close. Three straight incompletions by the Badgers would set up a fourth down where the Badgers tried a trick punt play that failed. A big 31-yard completion by the Gophers on their drive put them inside the Badgers 40-yard line. They could not pickup another first down and the Badgers defense held on a fourth down try by the Gophers. The Badgers would punt after three running plays. Minnesota would drive into the Badgers red zone but only to again be forced to turn the ball over on downs. The Badgers were then able to run out the final four minutes and 52 seconds and win their 10th in a row versus the Golden Gophers, 20–7.

Game notes

- The Badgers have now beaten Minnesota 10-straight times, dating back to 2004. It is the longest winning streak by either team in the history of the series (123 meetings dating back to 1890).
- Minnesota still leads the all-time series 58–57–8 but UW leads the series 39–24–3 since Paul Bunyan's Axe was introduced in 1948.
- Wisconsin has allowed less than 250 yards of total offense six times this season, including just 185 yards in the game.
- White scored his 45th career rushing touchdown and 48th overall TD on a 1-yard run in the second quarter. That moves him into ninth place on the Big Ten's all-time rushing TDs list, passing Billy Marek (Wisconsin) and Eddie George (Ohio State), and third place alone on UW's all-time rushing TDs list (behind Montee Ball and Ron Dayne).
- White finished the game with 26 carries for 125 yards, his eighth 100-yard rushing effort of the season and 17th of his career. The Badgers are 17–0 when White runs for at least 100 yards.
- With a 2-yard touchdown reception in the third quarter, senior WR Jared Abbrederis now has seven TD catches on the season and 23 in his career. That ties him with Tony Simmons for second all-time on UW's career touchdown receptions list, trailing only Lee Evans (27).
- Abbrederis now has 2,975 career receiving yards, moving past Brandon Williams and into second place on UW's career list, behind only Evans (3,468).
- Borland forced and recovered a fumble on Minnesota's first play of the second half. It was his 14th career forced fumble, tying Ryan Kerrigan of Purdue for the Big Ten record and tying five others for the FBS record. With two fumble recoveries during the game, Borland now has eight in his career, the most in school history.

Statistical leaders

- Rushing: James White – 26 Car, 125 Yds, TD
- Passing: Joel Stave – 16/26, 127 Yds, TD, INT
- Receiving: Jared Abbrederis – 7 Rec, 67 Yds, TD
- Defense: Chris Borland – 12 Tkls, TFL, FF, 2 FR

=== Penn State ===
Penn State at #14 Wisconsin

Team	1	2	3	4	Total
• Nittany Lions	7	7	10	7	31
#14 Badgers	0	14	0	10	24

- Date: November 30
- Location: Camp Randall Stadium
  Madison, WI
- Game start: 2:30 p.m.
- Elapsed time: 3:25
- Game attendance: 78,064
- Game weather: Clear, 42 °F (6 °C), wind: SSW 10 MPH
- Referee: Bill LeMonnier
- TV announcers (ESPN): Mike Patrick and Ed Cunningham

Scoring summary
1	13:05	Penn State	Adam Breneman 68-yard pass from Christian Hackenberg (Sam Ficken kick)	Penn State 7–0
2	11:50	Wisconsin	Brian Wozniak 4-yard pass from Joel Stave (Jack Russell kick)	Tied 7–7
2	05:05	Wisconsin	Jeff Duckworth 20-yard pass from Joel Stave (Jack Russell kick)	Wisconsin 14–7
2	01:16	Penn State	Eugene Lewis 3-yard pass from Christian Hackenberg (Sam Ficken kick)	Tied 14–14
3	08:29	Penn State	Jesse James 7-yard pass from Christian Hackenberg (Sam Ficken kick)	Penn State 21–14
3	04:56	Penn State	Sam Ficken 28-yard field goal	Penn State 24–14
4	12:59	Penn State	Eugene Lewis 59-yard pass from Christian Hackenberg (Sam Ficken kick)	Penn State 31–14
4	05:38	Wisconsin	Brian Wozniak 5-yard pass from Joel Stave (Jack Russell kick)	Penn State 31–21
4	04:13	Wisconsin	Jack Russell 48-yard field goal	Penn State 31–24

The Badgers finished the regular season at home against the Nittany Lions. The Badgers lead the all-time series 9–7. Penn State won the last meeting on November 24, 2012, 21–24 at State College.

Penn State came out on the opening drive and scored on the fourth play of the game with a 68-yard touchdown pass to WR Adam Breneman from QB Christian Hackenberg. Wisconsin's first drive would result in a three–and–out. On the Nittany Lions next drive, they drove down to the Badgers 17-yard line but would have to settle for a field goal attempt. The 34-yard field goal attempt by K Sam Ficken was blocked by the Badgers. Wisconsin would take over but after one first down, they would again punt. Penn State would punt they ball back to Wisconsin after their own three–and–out. The Badgers then were driving into Penn State territory as the first quarter came to an end. The Badgers continued their drive and would score on a 4-yard touchdown pass to TE Brian Wozniak from QB Joel Stave. Another three–and–out for the Nittany Lions would lead to another scoring drive for the Badgers. This was after an 11–play drive for the Badgers which was capped with a 20-yard touchdown pass to WR Jeff Duckworth from Joel Stave. Penn State answered on their next drive with a 3-yard touchdown pass to WR Eugene Lewis from Christian Hackenberg. Wisconsin then got to about midfield but were forced to punt. Penn State then ran one final play before halftime. The game was tied 14–14 at the half.

The Badgers started the second half with the ball but punted after three plays. Penn State capitalized as they would score on a 7-yard touchdown pass to TE Jesse James from Christian Hackenberg. Wisconsin's first drive of the half would end with the first turnover of the game. Joel Stave threw an interception that was returned to the Badgers 19-yard line. The Badgers would force the Nittany Lions to kick a 28-yard field goal giving Penn State a 24–14 lead. Back–to–back three–and–outs for both Wisconsin and then Penn State gave the Badgers the ball back at their own 34-yard line. Wisconsin was moving the ball to about midfield as the third quarter came to a close. After an 18-yard completion got the Badgers to the Nittany Lions 33-yard line, Joel Stave was again intercepted by Penn State. The Nittany Lions took over at their own 38-yard line and three plays later they were in the endzone again on a 59-yard touchdown pass to Eugene Lewis from Christian Hankenberg. The Badgers next drive would end on a turnover–on–downs after Joel Stave was sacked on fourth and 23. Penn State would punt the ball back to Wisconsin after a three–and–out. The Badgers would then score after a 13 play drive that was capped by a 5-yard touchdown pass to Brian Wozniak from Joel Stave. Wisconsin would force Penn State to punt after three plays and the Badgers blocked the punt. They took over at their own 42-yard line. Wisconsin would get to the Penn State 30-yard line but they were forced to kick a field goal. Wisconsin K Jack Russell then kicked a 48-yard field goal to making it a seven-point game with just over four minutes left in the game. Wisconsin forced a Penn State to a third–and–nine at the Penn State 18-yard line but RB Zach Zwinak broke loose for a 61-yard run. He was tackled at the Badgers 21-yard line. Three plays later, Penn State would try a 31-yard field goal. The field goal try was missed and the Badgers took over down by seven with 31 seconds left in the game. Joel Stave completed two passes to WR Jared Abbrederis to get to the Penn State 41-yard line with 7 seconds remaining. Joel Stave then threw a Hail Mary pass into the end zone but it was intercepted by Penn State with one second remaining. After a kneel-down, Penn State won, 31–24.

Game notes

- With 120 yards on the ground during the game, UW set a school record for rushing yards in a season (3,396). The school record was 3,309 set last season (2012). The 12-game mark of 3,305 was set in 1999.
- Sophomore QB Joel Stave finished with a career-high 339 yards passing and equaled his career-high with three touchdown passes. He also set career marks with 29 completions and 53 pass attempts. That is also the 21st 300-yards passing day in UW annals
- With three passing touchdowns during the game, Stave now has 20 TD passes this season, the third-best mark in school history, trailing only Russell Wilson (33 in 2011) and John Stocco (21 in 2005). He also has 26 career TD passes, which puts him in eighth place in Wisconsin history.
- Senior WR Jared Abbrederis tallied a career-high 12 catches for 135 yards. He now has 1,051 yards on the season, just the fourth 1,000-yard season in Wisconsin history and the first since Brandon Williams tallied 1,095 yards in 2005.
- Abbrederis now has 3,110 career receiving yards, moving into ninth place in Big Ten history, surpassing Purdue's Brian Alford (3,029) and Michigan's Anthony Carter (3,076).
- Senior TE Brian Wozniak caught a 4-yard touchdown pass in the second quarter and a 5-yard touchdown pass in the fourth quarter. He has five catches on the season, four of them for TDs.
- Senior NG Beau Allen blocked a Penn State field goal attempt in the first quarter. The last Badger to block a field goal was J. J. Watt against San Jose State on Sept. 11, 2010.
- Sophomore K Jack Russell converted a career-long 48-yard field goal in the fourth quarter. His previous career long was 38 yards.

Statistical leaders

- Rushing: Melvin Gordon – 13 Car, 91 Yds
- Passing: Joel Stave – 29/53, 339 Yds, 3 TD, 3 INT
- Receiving: Jared Abbrederis – 12 Rec, 135 Yds
- Defense: Chris Borland – 10 Tkls, 0.5 TFL

== Postseason ==
=== South Carolina ===
#19 Wisconsin at #8 South Carolina

Team	1	2	3	4	Total
#19 Badgers	0	14	3	7	24
• #8 Gamecocks	7	6	7	14	34

- Date: January 1
- Location: Florida Citrus Bowl Stadium
  Orlando, FL
- Game start: 12:00 p.m.
- Elapsed time: 3:25
- Game attendance: 56,629
- Game weather: Cloudy, 68 °F (20 °C), Wind: NE 7 MPH
- Referee: Jay Stricherz
- TV announcers (ABC): Brian Griese and Dave Pasch

Scoring summary
1	00:41	South Carolina	Bruce Ellington 39-yard pass from Connor Shaw (Elliott Fry kick)	South Carolina 7–0
2	12:45	Wisconsin	Sam Arneson 1-yard pass from Joel Stave (Jack Russell kick)	Tied 7–7
2	06:48	South Carolina	Connor Shaw 9-yard pass from Bruce Ellington (Patrick Fish rush failed)	South Carolina 13–7
2	00:13	Wisconsin	Jeff Duckworth 3-yard pass from Joel Stave (Jack Russell kick)	Wisconsin 14–13
3	11:19	Wisconsin	Jack Russell 35-yard field goal	Wisconsin 17–13
3	03:29	South Carolina	Bruce Ellington 22-yard pass from Connor Shaw (Elliott Fry kick)	South Carolina 20–17
4	11:05	South Carolina	Jerell Adams 3-yard pass from Connor Shaw (Elliott Fry kick)	South Carolina 27–17
4	10:54	Wisconsin	Kenzel Doe 91-yard kickoff return (Jack Russell kick)	South Carolina 27–24
4	05:48	South Carolina	Connor Shaw 1-yard run (Elliott Fry kick)	South Carolina 34–24

The Badgers closed out the 2013 season playing in the 2014 Capital One Bowl against the Gamecocks on January 1, 2014. The Badgers had never faced South Carolina.

The game started with the Badgers kicking off to the Gamecocks. South Carolina picked up three first downs but punted after they went to the Wisconsin 36-yard line. The Badgers then picked up two first downs on their first drive but stalled at the South Carolina 30-yard line. Wisconsin lined up in a punt formation and attempted a fake but Badgers punter Drew Meyer's pass was incomplete. The Gamecocks' next drive resulted in a punt. On the Badgers next drive, QB Joel Stave was trying to throw away a pass into the ground as he was pressured but the pass deflected off a leg of his own lineman and into the hands of a South Carolina defender. On the very next play, South Carolina QB Connor Shaw threw a 39-yard touchdown pass to WR Bruce Ellington. The first quarter came to an end as the Badgers started their drive. Wisconsin answered with a 1-yard touchdown pass to TE Sam Arneson from Joel Stave. South Carolina then drove 86 yards on 12 plays and scored on a reverse throwback to the quarterback. Wide receiver Bruce Ellington threw a 9-yard pass to quarterback Connor Shaw. The extra point failed because of a low snap, then caused the holder for South Carolina to try to run for the conversion but was tackled well short of the goal line. The Badgers answered again on their next drive with a 16 play, 75-yard drive that used up over six and a half minutes. The drive was capped by a 3-yard touchdown pass to WR Jeff Duckworth from Joel Stave. After the kickoff and a South Carolina kneel down, the Badgers led 14–13 at halftime.

The Badgers took the opening drive of the second half and moved into the Gamecocks red zone but were forced to settle for a 35-yard field goal by K Jack Russell. South Carolina got the ball for their first second-half drive. On their first play, Connor Shaw scrambled for 8 yards but fumbled after he was hit by Badgers LB Derek Landisch. The ball was recovered by fellow Badgers LB Ethan Armstrong. Wisconsin started at the South Carolina 31-yard line but failed to move the ball into the red zone and were forced to try a field goal. The kick from Jack Russell was wide right from 42 yards. South Carolina then drove 75 yards scoring on a 22-yard touchdown pass to Bruce Ellington from Connor Shaw. On the first play of the Badgers' next drive, QB Joel Stave scrambled for 5 yards but was hit hard by a South Carolina defender. A few plays later after handing the ball off, Stave was forced to leave the game with a shoulder injury. Taking over at quarterback for the Badgers was sixth-year senior Curt Phillips. The third quarter came to a close with the Badgers moving into Gamecock territory. On fourth and one from the South Carolina 26-yard line, Wisconsin decided to go for the first down instead to try a 40-plus-yard field goal. The Gamecocks' defense stuffed the Badgers and they turned the ball over on downs. Six plays later, South Carolina extended their lead with a 3-yard touchdown pass to Jerell Adams from Connor Shaw. However, the Badgers struck quickly on the ensuring kickoff. Badgers kick returner, Kenzel Doe, returned the kickoff 91 yards for a touchdown. The return was highlighted with a stiff arm that sprung Doe for the score. The Badgers were within three with just under 11 minutes left in the game. Once again, South Carolina would answer this time a 9 play 88-yard drive capped by a 1-yard touchdown run by Connor Shaw on a QB sneak. The Badgers then took over and got to the Gamecocks 47-yard line before Curt Phillips was intercepted. With less than five minutes left, the Gamecocks took over. Wisconsin LB Conor O'Neill then forced a fumble that was recovered by CB Darius Hillary. The Badgers then moved the ball to the Gamecocks 16-yard line but again backup QB Curt Phillips was intercepted. The Badgers defense forced the Gamecocks to punt and the Badgers took over with 2:10 left in the game still down by 10 points. Wisconsin got to South Carolina's 17-yard line but the Badgers tried a trick play with a screen to WR Jared Abbrederis who then attempted to pitch the ball to RB Melvin Gordon but he mishandled the ball and fumbled turning the ball over to South Carolina. Two kneel-downs later and the game was over with a South Carolina victory over Wisconsin, 34–24.

Game notes

- With 250 rushing yards in the game, RBs James White and Melvin Gordon became the FBS single-season all-time leading rushing duo. Gordon finished the season with 1,609 yards while White rushed for 1,444 yards. Their combined total 3,053 yards are better than the FBS record of 3,004 set by Nevada's Cody Fajardo and Stefphon Jefferson in 2012.
- Gordon and White are also the first teammates in FBS history to rush for at least 1,400 yards in the same season.
- UW ran for 293 yards in the game, the third-best rushing performance in a bowl game in school history.
- Kenzel Doe returned a fourth-quarter kickoff 91 yards for a touchdown. The last Badger to return a kickoff for a touchdown was David Gilreath, who took the opening kickoff 97 yards for a touchdown against No. 1 Ohio State on Oct. 16, 2010. It is the first time a UW player has returned a kickoff for a touchdown in a bowl game. The previous long kickoff return in a bowl game was also by Gilreath, 60 yards vs. Tennessee in the 2008 Outback Bowl.
- Sophomore RB Melvin Gordon rushed for at least 140 yards for the eighth time this season, running for 143 yards on 25 carries in the game. His season total of 1,609 is good for 8th all-time in UW history.
- Senior RB James White ran for 106 yards in the game, finishing his career with 4,011 rushing yards, good for fourth place in school history, trailing only Ron Dayne (7,125), Montee Ball (5,140) and Anthony Davis (4,676). For White, it was his 18th career 100-yard rushing game, tying him with John Clay for sixth place on Wisconsin's all-time list.
- Gordon and White ran for 100 yards in the same game for the sixth time this season and the seventh time in their careers.
- Sophomore QB Joel Stave threw two touchdown passes in the first half, his 21st and 22nd touchdown passes of the season. That moved him into second place on UW's single-season list, trailing only Russell Wilson (33 TD passes in 2011).
- Sophomore FB Derek Watt (younger brother of NFL DE J. J. Watt) carried the ball for the first time this season and just the third time in his career, picking up eight yards.

Statistical leaders

- Rushing: Melvin Gordon – 25 Car, 143 yds
- Passing: Joel Stave – 9/13, 80 yds, 2 TD, INT
- Receiving: Jacob Pedersen – 3 Rec, 50 yds
- Defense: Chris Borland – 9 Tkls

== Coaching staff ==
Name	Position
Gary Andersen	Head coach
Dave Aranda	Defensive coordinator/linebackers coach
Andy Ludwig	Offensive coordinator/quarterbacks coach
Chris Beatty	Wide receivers coach
Ben Strickland/Bill Busch	Secondary Coach
Jeff Genyk	Tight ends coach/special teams coordinator
Thomas Hammock	Assistant head coach/rbs coach/recruiting coordinator
Chad Kauha'aha'a	Defensive line coach
T.J. Woods	Offensive line coach
Luke Swan	Offensive Graduate Assistant

== Roster ==
2013 Wisconsin Badgers football team roster
Players
Coaches
Offense

Pos.	#	Name	Class
WR	1	A. J. Jordan	So
QB	2	Joel Stave	So
WR	3	Kenzel Doe	Jr
WR	4	Jared Abbrederis	Sr
RB	6	Corey Clement	Fr
WR	7	Brett Arnold	Sr
TE	8	T. J. Watt	Fr
WR	9	Jordan Fredrick	So
QB	10	Curt Phillips	Sr
WR	11	Jazz Peavy	Fr
QB	12	Thad Armstrong	Fr
QB	13	Bart Houston	Fr
QB	14	Connor Senger	Fr
WR	15	Jeff Duckworth	Sr
WR	16	Reggie Love	So
QB/S	17	Tanner McEvoy	So
WR	18	Lance Baretz	So
RB	20	James White	Sr
RB	22	Jeffrey Lewis	Jr
RB	23	Vonte Jackson	Fr
RB	25	Melvin Gordon	So
FB	26	Derek Straus	So
RB	30	Austin Ramesh	Fr
WR	31	Connor Cummins	Jr
FB	34	Derek Watt	So
FB	36	D. J. Spurling	Fr
FB	37	Kevin MacCudden	Jr
TE	38	Eric Steffes	Fr
TE	41	Troy Fumagalli	Fr
TE	42	Alex Walker	Fr
TE	46	Austin Traylor	So
TE	48	Jacob Pedersen	Sr
TE	49	Sam Arneson	Jr
OL	54	Kyle Costigan	Jr
OL	55	Trent Denlinger	Fr
OL	58	Jacob Ninneman	Jr
OL	60	Matt Miller	Fr
OL	61	Tyler Marz	So
OL	62	Walker Williams	Fr
OL	67	Chris Gill	Sr
OL	70	Dan Voltz	Fr
OL	71	Ray Ball	So
OL	72	Ben Hemer	Fr
OL	73	Dallas Lewallen	Jr
OL	74	Hayden Biegel	Fr
OL	75	Zac Matthias	Sr
OL	76	Aidan McNamara	Fr
OL	77	Jackson Keeler	Fr
OL	78	Rob Havenstein	Jr
OL	79	Ryan Groy	Sr
TE	81	Brock DeCicco	Sr
WR	82	Jake Stengel	So
WR	82	Robert Wheelwright	Fr
TE	85	Brian Wozniak	Sr
WR	86	Alex Erickson	Fr
TE	87	Scot MacMillan	Jr

Defense

Pos.	#	Name	Class
CB	5	Darius Hillary	So
OLB	6	Alec James	Fr
S	7	Michael Caputo	So
CB	8	Sojourn Shelton	Fr
S	8	Isaiah Williams	Jr
CB	10	Devin Gaulden	Jr
CB	11	T. J. Reynard	So
S	12	Dezmen Southward	Sr
LB	13	Conor O'Neill	Sr
S	14	Nate Hammon	Fr
S	16	Joe Ferguson	Fr
OLB	17	Sherard Cadogan	Jr
CB	18	Dare Ogunbowale	Fr
S	19	Leo Musso	Fr
CB	21	Peniel Jean	Jr
CB	22	Jakarrie Washington	Fr
S	23	Jerry Ponio	Sr
S	24	Keelon Brookins	Fr
S	26	Matt Johnson	Fr
S	27	Kyle Zuleger	Sr
S	28	Matt Hubley	Fr
CB	29	Terrance Floyd	So
ILB	30	Derek Landisch	Jr
CB	31	Hugs Etienne	Fr
OLB	32	Leon Jacobs	Fr
DE	34	Chikwe Obasih	Fr
OLB	36	Ethan Armstrong	Sr
OLB	41	Jesse Hayes	So
S	43	Michael Trotter	Jr
ILB	44	Chris Borland	Sr
NT	45	Warren Herring	Jr
OLB	47	Vince Biegel	Fr
ILB	48	Jack Cichy	Fr
OLB	50	Josh Harrison	Jr
DE	51	Tyler Dippel	Sr
ILB	52	Carl Miller	Fr
LB	54	Jake Rademacher	Fr
ILB	55	Garret Dooley	Fr
ILB	57	Ben Ruechel	Jr
OLB	58	Joe Schobert	So
ILB	59	Marcus Trotter	Jr
NT	77	Bryce Gilbert	Jr
DE	87	Ethan Hemer	Sr
DT	91	Konrad Zagzebski	Jr
DE	92	Pat Muldoon	Sr
DE	93	Jake Keefer	So
DE	94	Logan Schmidt	Fr
DT	95	Arthur Goldberg	Fr
DT	96	Beau Allen	Sr
OLB	97	Brendan Kelly	Sr
DE	99	James Adeyanju	So

Special teams

Pos.	#	Name	Class
K	37	Andrew Endicott	Fr
LS	39	Brady Kelliher	Fr
LS	56	James McGuire	Jr
LS	60	Connor Udelhoven	Fr
P	90	Drew Meyer	So
P	91	Brett Nethery	Fr
K	94	Kyle French	Jr
K	97	Jack Russell	So
K	98	Stephen Salata	So

Head coach

- Gary Andersen (Utah)

Coordinators/assistant coaches

- Thomas Hammock (Northern Illinois)
  Asst. head coach, Running Backs, Recruiting coordinator
- Dave Aranda (Cal Lutheran)
  Defensive coordinator, Linebackers
- Andy Ludwig (Portland State)
  Offensive coordinator, Quarterback
- Chris Beatty (East Tennessee State)
  Wide receivers
- Bill Busch (Nebraska Wesleyan)
  Safeties
- Jeff Genyk (Bowling Green)
  Tight ends, Special Team coordinator
- Chad Kauha'aha'a (Utah)
  Defensive line
- Ben Strickland (Wisconsin)
  Cornerbacks
- T. J. Woods (Azusa Pacific)
  Offensive line
- Luke Swan (Wisconsin)
  Offensive Graduate Assistant
- Zach Nyborg (BYU)
  Director of football operations
- Kite Afeaki (Utah)
  Assistant Director of football operations
- Vince Guinta (Utah)
  On-Campus Player Development, Recruiting coordinator
- Evan Simon (Frostburg State)
  Head strength and conditioning coach

Legend

- (C) Team captain
- (S) Suspended
- (I) Ineligible
- Injured
- Redshirt

Roster

== Team statistics ==
(as of January 2, 2014)

=== Passing ===
Note: G = Games played; COMP = Completions; ATT = Attempts; COMP % = Completion percentage; YDS = Passing yards; TD = Passing touchdowns; INT = Interceptions; EFF = Passing efficiency

Pos.	Player	G	COMP	ATT	COMP %	YDS	TD	INT	EFF
LB	Chris Borland	12	1	1	100.0	23	0	0	293.2
QB	Bart Houston	2	1	1	100.0	8	0	0	167.2
P	Drew Meyer	13	0	1	0.0	0	0	0	0.0
QB	Curt Phillips	3	7	14	50.0	37	0	2	43.6
QB	Joel Stave	13	208	336	61.9	2,494	22	13	138.1

=== Rushing ===
Note: G = Games played; ATT = Attempts; YDS = Yards; AVG = Average yard per carry; LG = Longest run; TD = Rushing touchdowns

Pos.	Player	G	ATT	YDS	AVG	LG	TD
WR	Jared Abbrederis	13	6	119	19.8	49	2
TE	Sam Arneson	13	1	−7	−7.0	0	0
RB	Corey Clement	12	67	547	8.2	75	7
WR	Kenzel Doe	11	1	−17	−17.0	0	0
WR	Jeff Duckworth	10	1	6	6.0	6	0
WR	Alex Erickson	13	1	12	12.0	12	0
RB	Melvin Gordon	13	206	1,609	7.8	80	12
RB	Jeffrey Lewis	2	3	2	0.7	1	0
QB	Curt Phillips	3	3	11	3.7	7	0
QB	Joel Stave	13	37	−22	−0.6	10	1
FB	Derek Watt	12	1	8	8.0	8	0
RB	James White	13	221	1,444	6.5	93	13

=== Receiving ===
Note: G = Games played; REC = Receptions; YDS = Yards; AVG = Average yard per catch; LG = Longest catch; TD = Receiving touchdowns

Pos.	Player	G	REC	YDS	AVG	LG	TD
TE	Sam Arneson	13	6	57	9.5	20	2
WR	Jared Abbrederis	13	78	1,081	13.9	65	7
RB	Corey Clement	12	1	9	9.0	9	0
TE	Brock DiCicco	13	1	16	16.0	16	0
WR	Kenzel Doe	11	7	57	8.1	11	0
WR	Jeff Duckworth	10	12	176	14.7	51	2
WR	Alex Erickson	13	9	127	14.1	35	0
WR	Jordan Fredrick	13	10	106	10.6	19	0
RB	Melvin Gordon	13	1	5	5.0	5	0
TE	Jacob Pedersen	12	39	551	14.1	61	3
FB	Derek Straus	7	3	10	3.3	4	1
FB	Derek Watt	12	3	20	6.7	12	1
WR	Robert Wheelwright	12	2	9	4.5	6	0
RB	James White	13	39	300	7.7	35	2
TE	Brian Wozniak	13	6	33	5.5	9	4

=== Kick and punt returning ===
Note: G = Games played; PR = Punt returns; PYDS = Punt return yards; PLG = Punt return long; KR = Kick returns; KYDS = Kick return yards; KLG = Kick return long; TD = Total return touchdowns

Pos.	Player	G	PR	PYDS	PLG	KR	KYDS	KLG	Total Return TDs
WR	Jared Abbrederis	13	11	94	35	0	0	0	0
TE	Sam Arneson	13	0	0	0	1	9	9	0
WR	Kenzel Doe	11	16	116	26	20	529	91	1
CB	Sojour Shelton	13	1	−2	0	0	0	0	0
RB	James White	13	0	0	0	1	7	7	0
TE	Brian Wozniak	13	0	0	0	1	18	18	0
S	Kyle Zuleger	13	0	0	0	8	153	27	0

=== Kicking ===
Note: G = Games played; FGM = Field goals made; FGA = Field goals attempted; LG = Field goal long; XPT = Extra points made; XPT ATT = XPT attempted; TP = Total points

Pos.	Player	G	FGM	FGA	LG	XPT	XPT ATT	TP
K	Kyle French	8	5	8	42	23	24	38
K	Jack Russell	10	9	13	48	34	34	61

=== Punting ===
Note: G = Games played; P = Punts; YDS = Yards; AVG = Average per punt; LG = Punt long; In20 = Punts inside the 20; TB = Touchbacks

Pos.	Player	G	P	YDS	AVG	LG	In20	TB
P	Drew Meyer	13	53	2,045	38.6	58	19	3

=== Defensive ===
Note: G = Games played; Solo = Solo tackles; Ast = Assisted tackles; Total = Total tackles; TFL-Yds = Tackles for loss-yards lost; Sack–Yds = Sack(s)–yards lost; INT = Interceptions; PDef = Passes defended; FF = Forced fumbles; FR = Forced recoveries

Pos.	Player	G	Solo	Ast	Total	TFL-Yds	Sack–Yds	INT	PDef	FF	FR
LB	Chris Borland	12	72	39	111	8.5–31	4.0–15	0	2	1	2
S	Michael Caputo	13	36	27	63	3.0–7	0.0–0	0	3	0	0
LB	Ethan Armstrong	13	33	18	51	5.0–13	2.0–9	0	2	0	2
LB	Conor O'Neill	12	24	18	42	5.5–13	2.0–4	0	1	1	0
S	Dezmen Southward	13	26	14	40	3.5–7	0.0–0	1	6	1	1
CB	Sojourn Shelton	13	31	5	36	0.0–0	0.0–0	4	11	1	0
LB	Brendon Kelly	12	23	12	35	7.0–21	4.5–18	0	2	3	1
LB	Derek Landisch	10	19	14	33	2.0–11	1.0–10	0	1	1	1
CB	Darius Hillary	13	21	9	30	0.0–0	0.0–0	1	6	1	1
DE	Pat Muldoon	13	15	14	29	4.5–19	2.0–12	1	1	1	0
S	Tanner McEvoy	11	13	14	27	1.0–1	0.0–0	1	5	0	0
LB	Vince Biegel	13	19	6	25	3.0–14	2.0–9	0	2	0	0
LB	Joe Schobert	13	12	12	24	2.5–13	1.0–8	0	3	0	0
S	Nate Hammon	12	20	4	24	1.0–8	1.0–8	0	1	1	0
LB	Marcus Trotter	5	9	14	23	2.0–4	0.0–0	0	1	0	1
NT	Beau Allen	13	10	10	20	2.0–13	1.5–13	0	0	0	1
DE	Konrad Zagezebski	13	10	9	19	2.0–3	0.0–0	0	0	0	0
DE	Tyler Dippel	12	10	7	17	0.5–1	0.0–0	0	0	1	0
NT	Warren Herring	13	10	7	17	6.0–46	4.0–34	0	0	0	0
S	Leo Musso	13	7	8	15	1.0–5	0.0–0	1	1	0	0
DE	Ethan Hemer	13	7	6	13	2.0–3	0.0–0	0	2	0	1
CB	Peniel Jean	12	13	0	13	0.0–0	0.0–0	0	4	0	0
S	Kyle Zulegar	13	6	6	12	0.0–0	0.0–0	0	0	1	0
CB	Jakarrie Washington	11	8	2	10	0.0–0	0.0–0	0	0	0	0
CB	T.J. Reynard	7	5	3	8	0.0–0	0.0–0	0	1	0	0
NT	Bryce Gilbert	8	5	2	7	1.0–8	1.0–8	0	0	0	0
LB	Leon Jacobs	13	4	3	7	1.0–5	0.0–0	0	0	0	0
CB	Jerry Ponio	13	2	4	6	0.0–0	0.0–0	0	0	0	0
WR	A.J. Jordan	13	3	3	6	0.0–0	0.0–0	0	0	0	0
K	Andrew Endicott	10	5	0	5	0.0–0	0.0–0	0	0	0	0
RB	James White	13	4	0	4	0.0–0	0.0–0	0	0	1	0
CB	Dare Ogunbowale	8	3	0	3	0.0–0	0.0–0	0	0	0	0
LS	James McGuire	13	1	2	3	0.0–0	0.0–0	0	0	0	0
WR	Jordan Fredrick	13	2	1	3	0.0–0	0.0–0	0	0	0	0
OL	Rob Havenstein	13	2	0	2	0.0–0	0.0–0	0	0	0	0
WR	Alex Erickson	13	1	1	2	0.0–0	0.0–0	0	0	0	0
K	Kyle French	8	1	1	2	0.0–0	0.0–0	0	0	0	0
P	Drew Meyer	13	1	0	1	0.0–0	0.0–0	0	0	0	0
WR	Lance Baretz	3	0	1	1	0.0–0	0.0–0	0	0	0	0
DE	James Adeyanju	3	0	1	1	0.0–0	0.0–0	0	0	0	0
S	Joe Ferguson	4	1	0	1	0.0–0	0.0–0	0	0	0	0
S	Michael Trotter	4	1	0	1	0.0–0	0.0–0	0	0	0	0
RB	Jeffrey Lewis	2	0	1	1	0.0–0	0.0–0	0	0	0	0
RB	Melvin Gordon	13	1	0	1	0.0–0	0.0–0	0	0	1	0
LB	Jack Cichy	4	1	0	1	0.0–0	0.0–0	0	0	0	0
WR	Kenzel Doe	11	1	0	1	0.0–0	0.0–0	0	0	0	0
G	Kyle Costigan	13	0	0	0	0.0–0	0.0–0	0	1	0	0

== Regular starters ==
Note – Number of starts in parentheses ()

Position	Player
Quarterback	Joel Stave (13)
Running Back	James White (12); Melvin Gordon (4)
Fullback	Derek Watt (5)
Wide Receiver	Jared Abbrederis (11)
Tight End	Jacob Pedersen (11)
Tight End	Brian Wozniak (10)
Left Tackle	Tyler Marz (13)
Left Guard	Ryan Groy (13)
Center	Dallas Lewallen (7); Dan Voltz (6)
Right Guard	Kyle Costigan (12)
Right Tackle	Rob Havenstein (13)

Position	Player
Defensive End	Pat Muldoon (10)
Nose Guard	Beau Allen (12)
Defensive End	Ethan Hemer (8)
Outside Linebacker	Ethan Armstrong (11)
Inside Linebacker	Chris Borland (12)
Inside Linebacker	Conor O'Neill (9)
Outside Linebacker	Brendan Kelly (8)
Cornerback	Sojourn Shelton (12)
Strong Safety	Dezmen Southward (13)
Free Safety	Michael Caputo (11)
Cornerback	Darius Hillary (13)

== 2014 NFL draft ==
=== 2014 NFL Draft class ===
2014 NFL draft selections
Round	Pick #	Team	Player	Position
3	68	Atlanta Falcons	Dezmen Southward	Safety
3	77	San Francisco 49ers	Chris Borland	Linebacker
4	130	New England Patriots	James White	Running back
5*	176	Green Bay Packers	Jared Abbrederis	Wide receiver
7	224	Philadelphia Eagles	Beau Allen	Defensive tackle

* Fifth round compensatory pick

=== Signed undrafted free agents ===
- OL Ryan Groy, Chicago Bears
- TE Jacob Pedersen, Atlanta Falcons
- TE Brian Wozniak, Atlanta Falcons
- DE Ethan Hemer, Pittsburgh Steelers
