= Ethan Hemer =

American football player (born 1991)

No. 79
- Position: Defensive end

Personal information
- Born: March 30, 1991 (age 35); Medford, Wisconsin, U.S.
- Listed height: 6 ft 6 in (1.98 m)
- Listed weight: 282 lb (128 kg)

Career information
- High school: Medford (WI)
- College: Wisconsin
- NFL draft: 2014: undrafted

Career history
- Pittsburgh Steelers (2014–2015)*
- * Offseason or practice squad member only
- Stats at Pro Football Reference

Ethan Hemer (born March 30, 1991) is an American former football defensive end. He played college football at Wisconsin. Hemer was undrafted in the 2014 NFL draft and signed as a free agent on May 10, 2014.

== Early life ==
Hemer attended Medford Area Senior High School in Medford, Wisconsin, where he was First-team All-State (WFCA, Wisconsin Preps) as a Senior, Second-team All-State selection by the Associated Press, First-team All-Region, All-Area, All-Conference, Conference Defensive Player of the Year and Team Captain. He was a letterman in football, hockey, and track. As a senior, he qualified for state in the Discus throw. His high school career totals of 146 tackles, 47 TFLs and 11 QB sacks. Coached by Ted Wilson.

== College career ==
=== 2009 ===
Hemer walked onto the Badgers in 2009 and redshirted his Freshman season. Hemer was named the defensive scout team player of the week for the game against Purdue. Hemer was named the Badgers defensive scout team player of the year.

=== 2010 ===
Hemer played in all 13 games his redshirt Freshman year, which included him starting the last 6 games of the year. Hemer played in his first career game against UNLV September 4 and recorded his first tackle against Arizona State on September 18. Hemer posted 2 tackles in the Rose Bowl game against TCU. He was named co-defensive player of the week against Iowa after his first career start where he recorded 6 tackles. He earned Academic-All Big 10.

=== 2011 ===
Hemer started all 14 games for the Badgers his redshirt Sophomore year. He was named defensive player of the week against UNLV September 4 after recording 4 tackles. On October 22 Hemer recorded his first career sack against Michigan State. Hemer had a season high 5 tackles in the Big 10 Championship game against Michigan State on December 3.

=== 2012 ===
Hemer started all 13 games for the Badgers his redshirt Junior year. Hemer record 5 tackles and a tackle for loss in a game against UTEP on September 22. On October 6 in a game against Illinois Hemer had 1 sack and a tackle for a loss. For his efforts in the 2012 campaign, Hemer was selected as Honorable Mention All-Big 10 (Coaches).

=== 2013 ===
Prior to the 2013 season Hemer was Preseason 3rd Team All-Big 10 (Athlon) and 4th Team All-Big 10 (Phil Steele). Hemer was moved from Defensive Tackle to Defensive End in the new 3–4 defense. Hemer played in all 13 games and started 8 of them. He recorded a season high 3 tackles in games against Iowa, Minnesota, and Penn State. At the Badger pro day Hemer bench pressed 225 pounds 32 times, which would have tied for 2nd best at the NFL scouting combine among D-linemen had he been invited. He clocked in at 4.95 in the 40. In the vertical he got as high as 29.5 inches. And in the broad jump, 109 inches.

=== College statistics ===
Year	Team	Solo	Ast	Total	TFL	Sack	INT	FF	FR
2009	Wisconsin	0	0	0	0.0	0.0	0	0	0
2010	Wisconsin	10	11	21	0.5	0.0	0	0	0
2011	Wisconsin	12	22	34	1.0	1.0	0	0	0
2012	Wisconsin	14	10	24	2.5	1.0	0	0	0
2013	Wisconsin	7	6	13	2.0	9.0	0	0	1
College totals		43	49	92	6.0	2.0	0	0	1

== Professional career ==
=== Pittsburgh Steelers ===
Hemer went undrafted in the 2014 NFL draft. He later signed with the Pittsburgh Steelers on May 10, 2014. Throughout training camp and preseason Hemer competed for a roster spot with Josh Mauro and Nick Williams.

Hemer spent the 2014 season on the Pittsburgh Steelers practice squad. After the 2014 preseason Hemer made the practice squad, but on November 5 he was cut by the Steelers. A week later the Steelers brought back Hemer after Josh Mauro was claimed by the Arizona Cardinals. On January 5, 2015 Hemer signed a Future/Reserve contract with the Steelers.

He was released by the Steelers and was signed to the practice squad on September 6, 2015 but was released the following day.

=== Professional statistics ===
				Tackles			Other					Interceptions			
Year	Team	G	GS	Comb	Solo	Assist	Sack	Safety	Pass Def	FF	TDs	Int	Yds	Avg	Lng
2014	Pittsburgh Steelers	0	0	0	0	0	0.0	–	0	0	0	0	0	0.0	0

== Personal life ==
Hemer has 1 brother and 1 sister. His brother Ben also played for the Wisconsin team, as Tackle. He got married in 2017 to his college sweetheart, former UW volleyball alum (2009-2012) Mary Ording. His parents are Jeff and Kathy Hemer.
