= Sojourn Shelton =

American football player (born 1994)

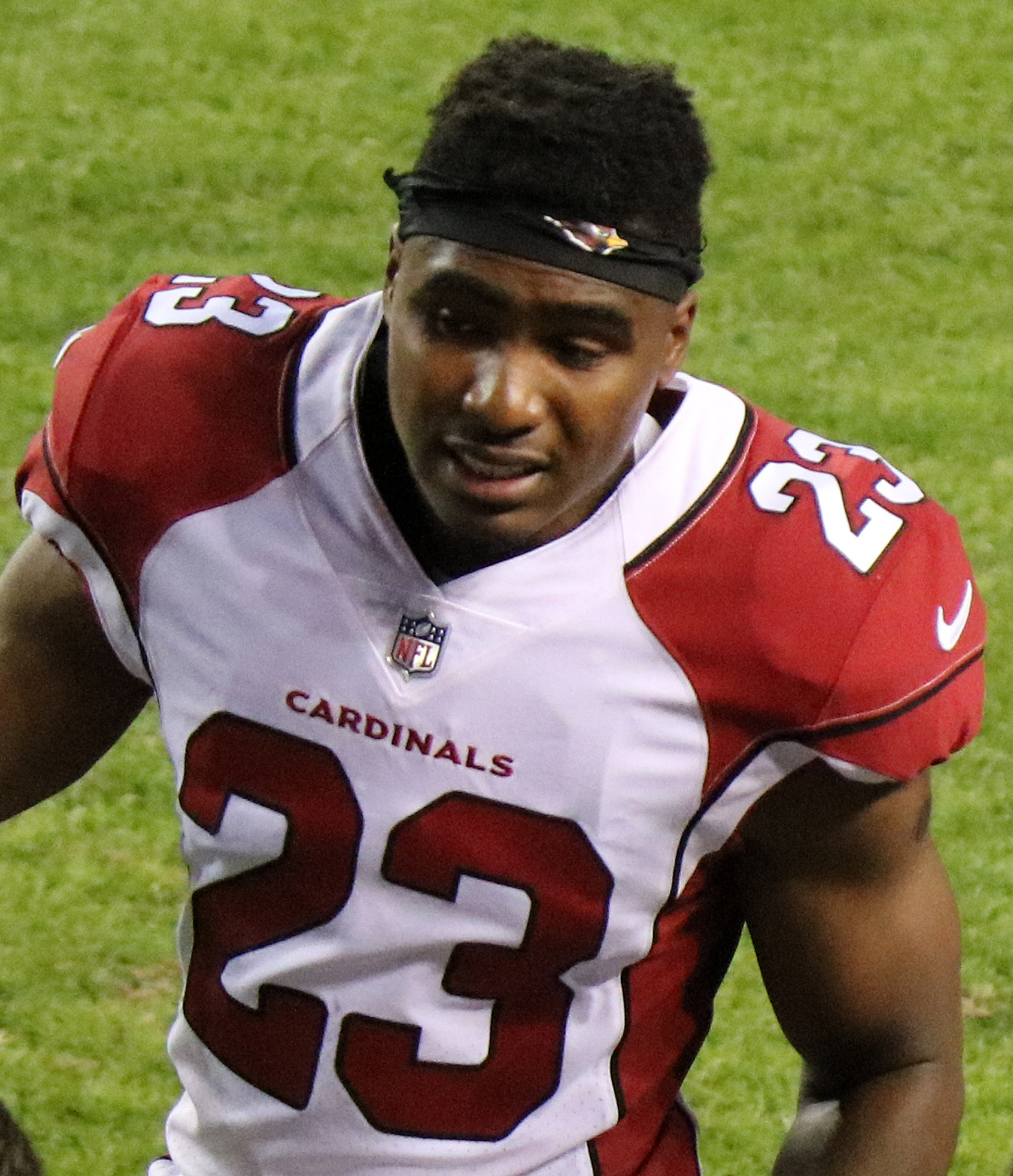
- Shelton with the Arizona Cardinals in 2017

No. 39
- Position: Cornerback

Personal information
- Born: December 25, 1994 (age 31); Fort Lauderdale, Florida, U.S.
- Listed height: 5 ft 9 in (1.75 m)
- Listed weight: 168 lb (76 kg)

Career information
- High school: Plantation (Plantation, Florida)
- College: Wisconsin
- NFL draft: 2017: undrafted

Career history
- Arizona Cardinals (2017)*; Cincinnati Bengals (2017–2018)*; Philadelphia Eagles (2019)*; Arizona Cardinals (2019–2020)*; Chicago Bears (2020)*
- * Offseason or practice squad member only

Awards and highlights
- First-team All-Big Ten (2016)
- Stats at Pro Football Reference

Sojourn Shelton II (born December 25, 1994) is an American former professional football cornerback. He played college football at Wisconsin, and was signed by the Arizona Cardinals as an undrafted free agent in 2017.

== Early life ==
Shelton attended Plantation High School in Plantation, Florida. He was a defensive back for their football team. As a senior, he was rated as a four-star recruit and the 27th best cornerback in the nation. After receiving offers from several big colleges such as Florida State, Ole Miss, and West Virginia, Shelton committed to the University of Wisconsin–Madison to play college football.

== College career ==
In his first year with the Badgers in 2013, Shelton played all 13 games in the season which included 12 starts at cornerback, in which he recorded thirty-six tackles, four interceptions (tying for third in the Big Ten), and seven pass breakups. He became the first true freshmen to start in a season opener since Travis Frederick in 2009. In 2014, he had a season that only included 33 tackles and 6 pass breakups.

In 2015, Shelton seemed to have an increasingly mediocre season, statistically. He recorded 27 tackles, one interception, and seven pass breakups. His sole interception came in the fourth quarter of the 2015 Holiday Bowl helping seal a 23-21 victory over The University of Southern California Trojans. In his final season with Wisconsin in 2016, he had a career high season in interceptions and pass breakups with 4 interceptions and 12 pass-breakups. On November 26, 2016, he logged a 2 interception game against Minnesota.

== Professional career ==
After what most analysts called an "above average" career at Wisconsin, he was projected to go undrafted by NFL.com. He was invited to the 2016 NFL Combine, where he performed in every workout besides the splits. He achieved a 4.02 second 20-yard shuttle, which ranked third best in his position. He attended the Wisconsin Badgers Pro day, where he chose to only do the 40 yard dash, broad jump, and three cone drill.

Pre-draft measurables
Height	Weight	Arm length	Hand span	40-yard dash	20-yard shuttle	Three-cone drill	Vertical jump	Broad jump	Bench press	Wonderlic
5 ft 9 in (1.75 m)	177 lb (80 kg)	31 in (0.79 m)	8 3/8 in (0.21 m)	4.51 s	4.02 s	6.92 s	35 in (0.89 m)	10 ft 0 in (3.05 m)	10 reps	14
All values from NFL Combine

=== Arizona Cardinals (first stint) ===
Shelton was signed by the Arizona Cardinals as an undrafted free agent on May 2, 2017. He was waived on September 2, 2017.

=== Cincinnati Bengals ===
On September 4, 2017, Shelton was signed to the Cincinnati Bengals' practice squad. He was released on October 27, 2017. On November 14, 2017, Shelton was signed back to the Bengals practice squad. He signed a reserve/future contract with the Bengals on January 1, 2018.

On August 23, 2018, Shelton was waived by the Bengals.

=== Philadelphia Eagles ===
On August 11, 2019, Shelton was signed by the Philadelphia Eagles. He was waived during final roster cuts on August 30, 2019.

=== Arizona Cardinals (second stint) ===
On November 13, 2019, Shelton was signed to the Arizona Cardinals practice squad. He signed a reserve/future contract with the Cardinals on December 30, 2019.

On June 1, 2020, Shelton was released by the Cardinals.

=== Chicago Bears ===
On December 30, 2020, Shelton signed with the practice squad of the Chicago Bears. His practice squad contract with the team expired after the season on January 18, 2021.
