= Beau Allen =

American football player (born 1991)

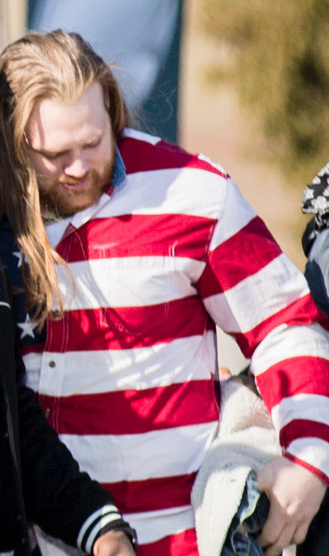
- Allen in 2018

No. 94, 91
- Position: Nose tackle

Personal information
- Born: November 14, 1991 (age 35); Minnetonka, Minnesota, U.S.
- Listed height: 6 ft 3 in (1.91 m)
- Listed weight: 327 lb (148 kg)

Career information
- High school: Minnetonka
- College: Wisconsin
- NFL draft: 2014: 7th round, 224th overall pick

Career history
- Philadelphia Eagles (2014–2017); Tampa Bay Buccaneers (2018–2019); New England Patriots (2020)

Awards and highlights
- Super Bowl champion (LII)

Career NFL statistics
- Total tackles: 117
- Sacks: 2.5
- Fumble recoveries: 1
- Stats at Pro Football Reference

Beau Christian Allen (born November 14, 1991) is an American former professional football player who was a nose tackle in the National Football League (NFL). He played college football for the Wisconsin Badgers and was selected by the Philadelphia Eagles in the seventh round of the 2014 NFL draft.

== Early life ==
Beau attended Minnetonka High School, graduating in 2010. He was the only Minnetonka student in history to start all four years under coach Dave Nelson. He was ranked 5th in the state by the website Rivals. He was recruited by Notre Dame, Stanford, Michigan, UCLA, amongst others. He ultimately chose Wisconsin as that is the alma mater of his parents.

== College career ==
In his last three years at the University of Wisconsin, Allen had eight sacks and 15 tackles for loss.

== Professional career ==
=== Philadelphia Eagles ===
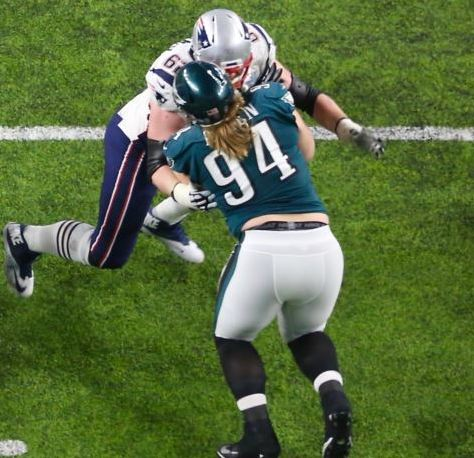
Allen (number 94) in Super Bowl LII

Allen was selected in the seventh round (224th overall) of the 2014 NFL draft by the Philadelphia Eagles. On May 15, 2014, he signed a four-year deal with the Eagles. As a rookie in 2014, Allen played all 16 games with 10 tackles and half a sack. In 2015, he played 16 games with 2 starts, finishing the year with 28 tackles and 2 passes defended.

On September 11, 2016, in a game against the Cleveland Browns, Allen played situational snaps at fullback, while still rotating in for plays on defense. The Eagles were able to score a rushing touchdown behind Allen's blocking, while he also had a tackle on defense. Beau finished the 2016 year with 29 tackles and 0.5 sacks.

On April 8, 2017, it was reported that Allen had suffered a pectoral injury that required 4–6 weeks to recover. Allen had 20 tackles and 1 sack for his 2017 season. Allen recorded 2 tackles in Super Bowl LII and beat the New England Patriots 41-33.

Allen is also known for carrying his passed out teammate Jason Kelce out of a Buffalo Billiards bar in Philadelphia after a night of heavy drinking following an Eagles holiday party. Allen has stated that carrying the famed Eagles center on the cobblestone streets "fireman style" was the hardest thing he's ever done because Kelce fought him the entire way.

=== Tampa Bay Buccaneers ===
On March 15, 2018, Allen signed a three-year contract worth an estimated $15 million with the Tampa Bay Buccaneers. In 13 games, he had 10 tackles and 0.5 sacks.

=== New England Patriots ===
On March 20, 2020, Allen signed a two-year deal worth up to $8 million with the New England Patriots. He was placed on injured reserve on September 7. Allen was designated to return from injured reserve on October 21, and began practicing with the team again; however, after he suffered an injury in practice, the Patriots declined to activate him after his 21-day practice period expired, and he was ruled out for the rest of the season. Allen was released after the season on March 18, 2021.

Allen announced his retirement from professional football on July 1, 2022.

== Career statistics ==
Pre-draft measurables
Height	Weight	Arm length	Hand span	20-yard shuttle	Three-cone drill	Vertical jump	Broad jump	Bench press
6 ft 2 1/2 in (1.89 m)	333 lb (151 kg)	32 1/8 in (0.82 m)	9 3/4 in (0.25 m)	4.50 s	7.27 s	31.0 in (0.79 m)	8 ft 8 in (2.64 m)	30 reps
All values from Pro Day

== Personal life ==
In October 2026, Allen, alongside former teammate Jason Kelce played in an amateur rugby game in London for Old Streetonians in a 30-minute friendly against Hackney RFC. The game followed a coaching session from former Harlequins and England prop Joe Marler and former USA Eagles centre Ilona Maher.
