= Andy Ludwig =

American football player and coach (born 1964)

Biographical details
- Born: May 14, 1964 (age 62); Ogden, Utah, U.S.

Playing career
- 1982–1983: Snow College
- 1985–1986: Portland State
- Position: Wide receiver

Coaching career (HC unless noted)
- 1987–1988: Portland State (WR)
- 1989–1991: Idaho State (QB/WR)
- 1992: Utah (GA)
- 1993–1994: Augustana (SD) (OC/WR/QB)
- 1995–1996: Boise State (QB)
- 1997: Cal Poly (OC)
- 1998–2001: Fresno State (OC)
- 2002–2004: Oregon (OC)
- 2005–2008: Utah (OC)
- 2009–2010: California (OC/QB)
- 2011–2012: San Diego State (OC)
- 2013–2014: Wisconsin (OC/QB)
- 2015: Vanderbilt (OC/QB)
- 2016–2017: Vanderbilt (OC/TE)
- 2018: Vanderbilt (OC/RB)
- 2019–2024: Utah (OC)

Andy Ludwig (born May 14, 1964) is an American football coach who was most recently the offensive coordinator and quarterbacks coach at the University of Utah. He played college football at Snow College and Portland State University, graduating in 1988.

== Coaching career ==
From 1987 to 1988, Ludwig was the receivers coach at Portland State. From 1989–1991, Ludwig was the quarterback and receiver coach at Idaho State. In 1992, Ludwig came to Utah to be the graduate assistant for the defense. From 1993 to 1994, Ludwig was the as the offensive coordinator at Augustana College in Sioux Falls, South Dakota. 1995 to 1996, he was the quarterback coach at Boise State University. In 1997, Ludwig was at California Polytechnic State University as offensive coordinator and quarterback coach. From 1998 to 2001, Ludwig was at California State University, Fresno, where he was a finalist for the Broyles Award in 2001. From 2002 to 2004, Ludwig was the offensive coordinator at Oregon. After some difficult years, Ludwig was hired by close personal friend and newly named Utah head coach Kyle Whittingham for the 2005 season. Following the 2009 Sugar Bowl, Ludwig accepted the offensive coordinator position at Kansas State, but two months later he was hired to be the offensive coordinator for the California Golden Bears for the 2009 season. In 2011, Ludwig was hired by new San Diego State coach Rocky Long to be offensive coordinator for the Aztecs. Ludwig was hired to be the offensive coordinator for the Wisconsin Badgers for the 2013 season. After spending two seasons as the offensive coordinator at Wisconsin, he began the 2015 season under Derek Mason at Vanderbilt University as the offensive coordinator. On January 10, 2019, Ludwig was hired by the University of Utah to return as offensive coordinator. He stepped down from the Utah Utes on October 20, 2024.

== Personal life ==
Ludwig is married and has two children.
