= Dezmen Southward =

American football player (born 1990)

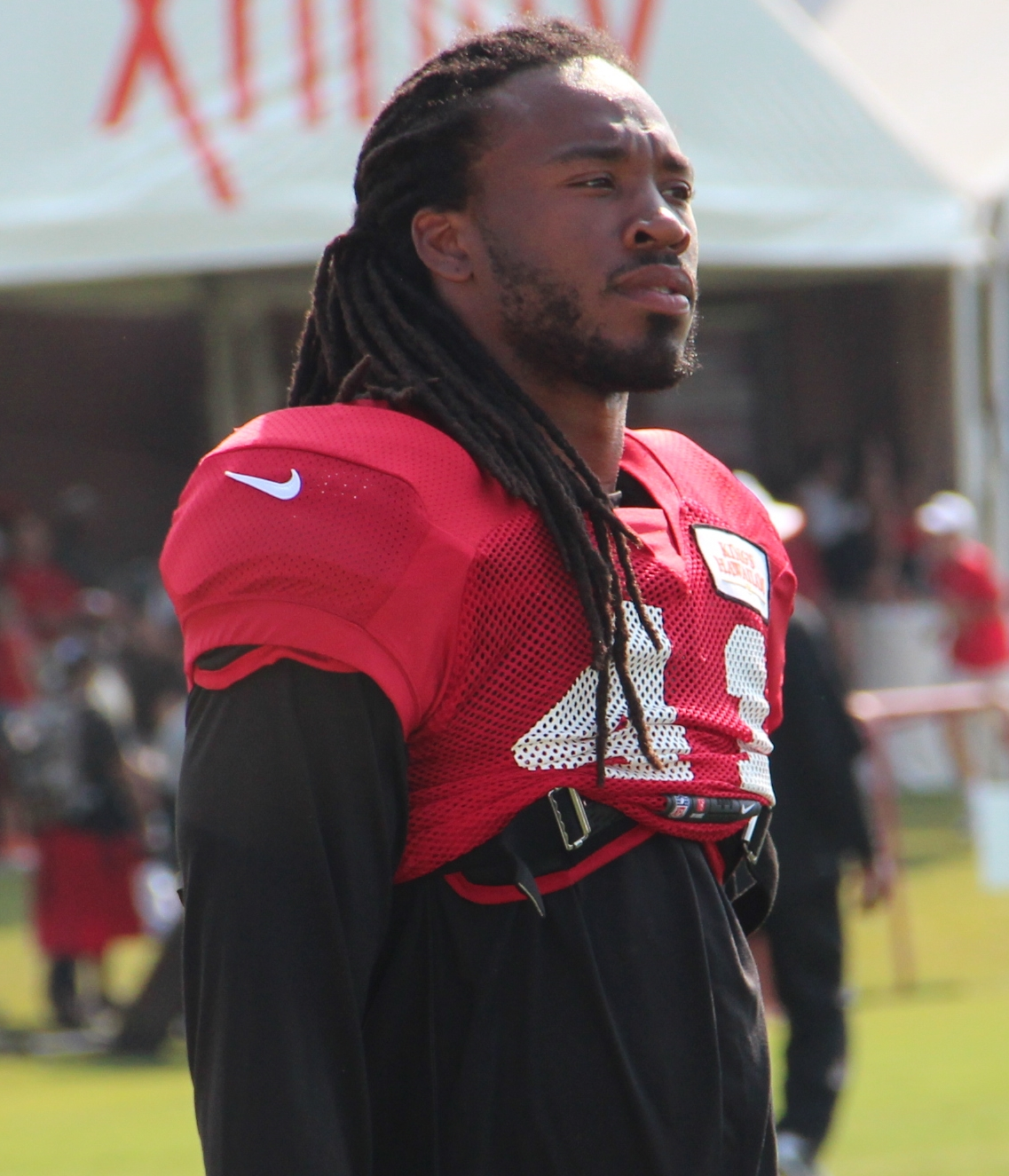
- Southward with the Atlanta Falcons in 2014

No. 41, 22, 37
- Position: Safety

Personal information
- Born: October 1, 1990 (age 36); Indianapolis, Indiana, U.S.
- Listed height: 6 ft 2 in (1.88 m)
- Listed weight: 208 lb (94 kg)

Career information
- High school: St. Thomas Aquinas (Fort Lauderdale, Florida)
- College: Wisconsin
- NFL draft: 2014: 3rd round, 68th overall pick

Career history
- Atlanta Falcons (2014–2015); Indianapolis Colts (2015–2016)*; Carolina Panthers (2016–2018)
- * Offseason or practice squad member only

Career NFL statistics
- Total tackles: 24
- Sacks: 1.0
- Interceptions: 1
- Stats at Pro Football Reference

Dezmen Southward (born October 1, 1990) is an American former professional football player who was a safety in the National Football League (NFL). He played college football for the Wisconsin Badgers, and was selected by the Atlanta Falcons in the third round of the 2014 NFL draft.

== Early life ==
Southward attended St. Thomas Aquinas High School in Fort Lauderdale, Florida, where he did not start playing organized football until his senior year. He was a starting defensive back for the team, helping lead the team to a national championship. He was also a key member of the school's basketball team, being named a three-year captain and two-time team MVP. He was considered a two-star recruit by Rivals.com.

== College career ==
He accepted a scholarship to the University of Wisconsin where he was a member of the Wisconsin Badgers football team from 2009 to 2013. He set a school record by playing in 54 games, never missing a game over his four-year career. He started 30 games for the Badgers, recording 152 total tackles and 11.5 tackles for loss, forcing four fumbles, adding two interceptions and breaking up 11 passes.

== Professional career ==
=== Atlanta Falcons ===
Southward was selected by the Atlanta Falcons in the third round (68th overall) of the 2014 NFL draft. In Week 11 of the 2014 season, Southward picked off Cleveland Browns quarterback Brian Hoyer for his first career interception.

During the 2015 offseason, the Atlanta Falcons hired Dan Quinn as their head coach, replacing the outgoing Mike Smith. Quinn quickly changed Southward to a cornerback, from his natural safety position, and praised Southward's "speed and length".

Southward was waived by the Falcons on November 6, 2015, after appearing in just three games for the Falcons.

=== Indianapolis Colts ===
Southward was signed to the practice squad of the Indianapolis Colts on November 10, 2015. On August 30, 2016, Southward was placed on injured reserve. On September 7, 2016, he was released from their injured reserve with an injury settlement.

=== Carolina Panthers ===
On December 28, 2016, Southward was signed to the Carolina Panthers' practice squad. He signed a reserve/future contract with the Panthers on January 12, 2017.

On September 2, 2017, Southward was waived by the Panthers and was signed to the practice squad the next day. He was promoted to the active roster on October 6, 2017. He was waived on October 16, 2017, and was re-signed to the practice squad the next day. He signed a reserve/future contract with the Panthers on January 8, 2018.

On September 1, 2018, Southward was waived by the Panthers and was signed to the practice squad the next day. He was released on September 11, 2018, but was re-signed on September 24. He was released again on October 30, 2018.
