= 2015 Wisconsin Badgers football team =

American college football season

2015 Wisconsin Badgers football

Holiday Bowl champion

Holiday Bowl, W 23–21 vs. USC
- Conference: Big Ten Conference
- West Division

Ranking
- Coaches: No. 21
- AP: No. 21
- Record: 10–3 (6–2 Big Ten)
- Head coach: Paul Chryst (1st season)
- Offensive coordinator: Joe Rudolph (1st season)
- Offensive scheme: Pro-style
- Defensive coordinator: Dave Aranda (3rd season)
- Base defense: 3–4
- MVP: Joe Schobert
- Captains: Michael Caputo; Alex Erickson; Joe Schobert; Joel Stave
- Home stadium: Camp Randall Stadium

Uniform
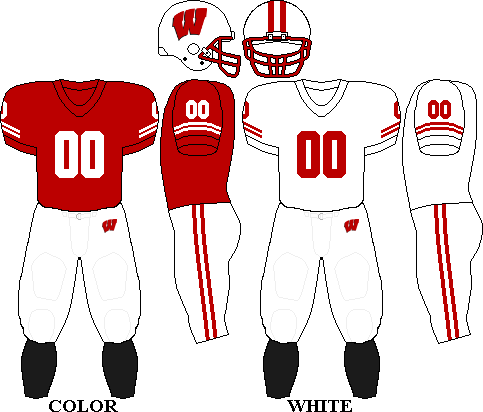

2015 Big Ten Conference football standings
	Conf.			Overall
Team	W		L	W		L
East Division
No. 6 Michigan State xy$^	7	–	1	12	–	2
No. 4 Ohio State x	7	–	1	12	–	1
No. 12 Michigan	6	–	2	10	–	3
Penn State	4	–	4	7	–	6
Indiana	2	–	6	6	–	7
Rutgers	1	–	7	4	–	8
Maryland	1	–	7	3	–	9
West Division
No. 9 Iowa xy	8	–	0	12	–	2
No. 23 Northwestern	6	–	2	10	–	3
No. 21 Wisconsin	6	–	2	10	–	3
Nebraska	3	–	5	6	–	7
Minnesota	2	–	6	6	–	7
Illinois	2	–	6	5	–	7
Purdue	1	–	7	2	–	10
Championship: Michigan State 16, Iowa 13
^ – College Football Playoff participant; $ – Conference champion; x – Division champion/co-champions; y – Championship game participant; Rankings from AP Poll

The 2015 Wisconsin Badgers football team represented the University of Wisconsin–Madison in the 2015 NCAA Division I FBS football season. The Badgers, led by first-year head coach Paul Chryst, were members of the West Division of the Big Ten Conference and played their home games at Camp Randall Stadium. On January 13, 2015, the Badgers hired offensive coordinator Joe Rudolph. The Badgers were the media preseason favorites to win the Big Ten West division. During fall camp prior to the start of the season Chryst announced the Badgers would return to a pro-style punt scheme instead of the shield punt scheme, also known as the spread punt scheme. Two days after Wisconsin played in the Holiday Bowl defensive coordinator Dave Aranda was hired by LSU as their new defensive coordinator. At the end of the season, Wisconsin featured the #1 defense in college football, with opponents averaging just 13.1 points per game against the Badgers.

== Recruiting ==
College recruiting (2015)
Name	Hometown	School	Height	Weight	40^{‡}	Commit date
Zack Baun; ATH	Brown Deer, WI	Brown Deer HS	6 ft 3 in (1.91 m)	210 lb (95 kg)	N/A	Jan 18, 2015
Zack Baun; ATH	Recruit ratings: Scout: Rivals: 247Sports: ESPN:					
Titus Booker; ATH	Grayslake, IL	Grayslake HS	6 ft 0 in (1.83 m)	182 lb (83 kg)	4.4	Jul 3, 2014
Titus Booker; ATH	Recruit ratings: Scout: Rivals: 247Sports: ESPN:					
Jon Dietzen; OL	Seymour, WI	Seymour HS	6 ft 5 in (1.96 m)	334 lb (151 kg)	5.3	May 4, 2014
Jon Dietzen; OL	Recruit ratings: Scout: Rivals: 247Sports: ESPN:					
David Edwards; ATH	Downers Grove, IL	Downers Grove North HS	6 ft 6 in (1.98 m)	225 lb (102 kg)	N/A	Jun 18, 2014
David Edwards; ATH	Recruit ratings: Scout: Rivals: 247Sports: ESPN:					
Kevin Estes; OL	San Marcos, CA	San Marcos HS	6 ft 6 in (1.98 m)	273 lb (124 kg)	N/A	Aug 15, 2014
Kevin Estes; OL	Recruit ratings: Scout: Rivals: 247Sports: ESPN:					
Arrington Farrar; DB	College Park, GA	Woodward Academy	6 ft 2 in (1.88 m)	201 lb (91 kg)	N/A	Jan 23, 2015
Arrington Farrar; DB	Recruit ratings: Scout: Rivals: 247Sports: ESPN:					
Alex Hornibrook; QB	Malvern, PA	Malvern Prep	6 ft 4 in (1.93 m)	210 lb (95 kg)	N/A	Jan 12, 2015
Alex Hornibrook; QB	Recruit ratings: Scout: Rivals: 247Sports: ESPN:					
Kraig Howe; DT	Kettering, OH	Archbishop Alter HS	6 ft 3 in (1.91 m)	262 lb (119 kg)	N/A	Jan 23, 2015
Kraig Howe; DT	Recruit ratings: Scout: Rivals: 247Sports: ESPN:					
Alec Ingold; ATH	Green Bay, WI	Bay Port HS	6 ft 1 in (1.85 m)	215 lb (98 kg)	N/A	Jun 21, 2014
Alec Ingold; ATH	Recruit ratings: Scout: Rivals: 247Sports: ESPN:					
Andrew James; WR	Fort Lauderdale, FL	Westminster Academy	5 ft 10 in (1.78 m)	161 lb (73 kg)	N/A	Mar 11, 2014
Andrew James; WR	Recruit ratings: Scout: Rivals: 247Sports: ESPN:					
David Moorman; OL	Northville, MI	Northville HS	6 ft 5 in (1.96 m)	291 lb (132 kg)	5.3	May 7, 2014
David Moorman; OL	Recruit ratings: Scout: Rivals: 247Sports: ESPN:					
Chris Orr; LB	DeSoto, TX	DeSoto HS	6 ft 0 in (1.83 m)	207 lb (94 kg)	4.6	Jun 14, 2014
Chris Orr; LB	Recruit ratings: Scout: Rivals: 247Sports: ESPN:					
Kyle Penniston; TE	Santa Ana, CA	Mater Dei HS	6 ft 4 in (1.93 m)	232 lb (105 kg)	N/A	Feb 17, 2014
Kyle Penniston; TE	Recruit ratings: Scout: Rivals: 247Sports: ESPN:					
David Pfaff; DE	Mequon, WI	Homestead HS	6 ft 1 in (1.85 m)	243 lb (110 kg)	4.9	May 21, 2014
David Pfaff; DE	Recruit ratings: Scout: Rivals: 247Sports: ESPN:					
Olive Sagapolu; DT	Santa Ana, CA	Mater Dei HS	6 ft 3 in (1.91 m)	300 lb (140 kg)	N/A	Oct 27, 2014
Olive Sagapolu; DT	Recruit ratings: Scout: Rivals: 247Sports: ESPN:					
Bradrick Shaw; RB	Hoover, AL	Hoover HS	6 ft 2 in (1.88 m)	210 lb (95 kg)	4.7	Sep 26, 2014
Bradrick Shaw; RB	Recruit ratings: Scout: Rivals: 247Sports: ESPN:					
Nick Thomas; LB	Bradenton, FL	IMG Academy	6 ft 1 in (1.85 m)	218 lb (99 kg)	N/A	Jun 12, 2014
Nick Thomas; LB	Recruit ratings: Scout: Rivals: 247Sports: ESPN:					
Jake Whalen; LB	Wausau, WI	Wausau HS	6 ft 1 in (1.85 m)	218 lb (99 kg)	4.6	Feb 1, 2015
Jake Whalen; LB	Recruit ratings: Scout: Rivals: 247Sports: ESPN:					
Overall recruit ranking: Scout: 31 Rivals: 37 247Sports: 35 ESPN: 38
‡ Refers to 40-yard dash; Note: In many cases, Scout, Rivals, 247Sports, On3, and ESPN may conflict in their listings of height, weight and 40 time.; In these cases, the average was taken. ESPN grades are on a 100-point scale.; Sources: "Wisconsin Football Commitment List 2015". Rivals.; "Wisconsin Football Recruiting Commits 2015". Scout.; "Wisconsin Badgers Commits 2015". ESPN.; "Scout.com Team Recruiting Rankings". Scout.; "2015 Team Ranking". Rivals.com.

== Watchlists and preseason awards ==
- Vince Biegel (OLB)

Bednarik Award, Bronko Nagurski Trophy, Lombardi Award

- Michael Caputo (S)

Lott IMPACT Trophy, Bednarik Award, Bronko Nagurski Trophy, Jim Thorpe Award

- Corey Clement (RB)

Maxwell Award, Doak Walker Award

- Alex Erickson (WR)

Biletnikoff Award

- Rafael Gaglianone (K)

Lou Groza Award

- Dan Voltz (C)

Rimington Trophy, Outland Trophy

== Schedule ==
Date	Time	Opponent	Rank	Site	TV	Result	Attendance
September 5	7:00 p.m.	vs. No. 3 Alabama*	No. 20	AT&T Stadium; Arlington, TX (Advocare Classic) (College GameDay)	ABC	L 17–35	64,279
September 12	11:00 a.m.	Miami (OH)*		Camp Randall Stadium; Madison, WI	ESPNU	W 58–0	76,535
September 19	2:30 p.m.	Troy*	No. 24	Camp Randall Stadium; Madison, WI	BTN	W 28–3	77,157
September 26	7:00 p.m.	Hawaii*	No. 22	Camp Randall Stadium; Madison, WI	BTN	W 28–0	80,829
October 3	11:00 a.m.	Iowa	No. 19	Camp Randall Stadium; Madison, WI (Heartland Trophy)	ESPN	L 6–10	80,933
October 10	2:30 p.m.	at Nebraska		Memorial Stadium; Lincoln, NE (Freedom Trophy)	ABC/ESPN2	W 23–21	89,886
October 17	11:00 a.m.	Purdue^{†}		Camp Randall Stadium; Madison, WI	BTN	W 24–7	80,794
October 24	2:30 p.m.	at Illinois		Memorial Stadium; Champaign, IL	BTN	W 24–13	45,438
October 31	11:00 a.m.	Rutgers		Camp Randall Stadium; Madison, WI	BTN	W 48–10	74,575
November 7	2:30 p.m.	at Maryland		Byrd Stadium; College Park, MD	BTN	W 31–24	44,678
November 21	2:30 p.m.	No. 20 Northwestern	No. 25	Camp Randall Stadium; Madison, WI	BTN	L 7–13	75,276
November 28	2:30 p.m.	at Minnesota		TCF Bank Stadium; Minneapolis, MN (Paul Bunyan's Axe)	BTN	W 31–21	52,850
December 30	9:30 p.m.	vs. No. 25 USC*		Qualcomm Stadium; San Diego, CA (Holiday Bowl)	ESPN	W 23–21	48,329
*Non-conference game; ^{†}Homecoming; Rankings from AP Poll and CFP Rankings after November 3 released prior to game; All times are in Central time

== Rankings ==
Ranking movements Legend: ██ Increase in ranking ██ Decrease in ranking — = Not ranked RV = Received votes
	Week															
Poll	Pre	1	2	3	4	5	6	7	8	9	10	11	12	13	14	Final
AP	20	RV	24	22	19	—	—	RV	RV	RV	23	21	RV	25	23	21
Coaches	18	24	23	21	18	RV	RV	RV	RV	RV	22	20	RV	25	23	21
CFP	Not released									—	25	25	—	—	—	Not released

== Game summaries ==
=== vs #3 Alabama ===
#3 Alabama Crimson Tide vs #20 Wisconsin Badgers

Quarter	1	2	3	4	Total
#3 Crimson Tide	7	7	14	7	35
#20 Badgers	0	7	3	7	17

at AT&T Stadium • Arlington, TX

- Date: September 5
- Game time: 7:00 p.m. CDT
- Game weather: Indoors
- Game attendance: 64,279
- Referee: Alan Eck
- TV announcers (ABC): Chris Fowler (Play-by-play), Kirk Herbstreit (Color) & Heather Cox (Sideline)

Game information

First Quarter

- ALA – Derrick Henry, 37-yard run (Adam Griffith kick), 5:54 (ALA 7–0)

Second Quarter

- WIS – Alex Erickson, 6-yard pass from Joel Stave (Rafael Gaglianone kick), 11:06 (TIE 7–7)
- ALA – Robert Foster, 17-yard pass from Jake Coker (Adam Griffith kick), 6:39 (ALA 14–7)

Third Quarter

- ALA – Derrick Henry, 56-yard run (Adam Griffith kick), 11:42 (ALA 21–7)
- ALA – Derrick Henry, 2-yard run (Adam Griffith kick), 5:17 (ALA 28–7)
- WIS – Rafael Gaglianone, 43-yard field goal, 1:05 (ALA 28–10)

Fourth Quarter

- ALA – Kenyan Drake, 43-yard run (Adam Griffith kick), 8:02 (ALA 35–10)
- WIS – Rob Wheelwright, 3-yard pass from Joel Stave (Rafael Gaglianone kick), 4:42 (ALA 35–17)

Passing

- WIS - Joel Stave, 26 completions, 39 attempts, 228 yards, 2 touchdowns, 1 interception
- ALA - Jake Coker, 15 completions, 21 attempts, 213 yards, 1 touchdown

Rushing

- WIS - Alex Erickson, 1 carry, 25 yards
- ALA - Derrick Henry, 13 carries, 147 yards, 3 touchdowns

Receiving

- WIS - Alex Erickson, 6 catches, 73 yards, 1 touchdown
- ALA - Robert Foster, 4 catches, 50 yards, 1 touchdown

Defense

- WIS - Joe Schobert, 13 tackles, 2 sacks, 4 tackles-for-loss
- ALA - Reggie Ragland, 12 tackles

Wisconsin starting lineup

Offense
Position	Player	Class
QB	Joel Stave	RS Sr
RB	Corey Clement	Jr
FB	Derek Watt	RS Sr
WR	Alex Erickson	RS Sr
WR	Rob Wheelwright	Jr
TE	Austin Traylor	RS Sr
LT	Tyler Marz	RS Sr
LG	Michael Deiter	RS Fr
C	Dan Voltz	RS Jr
RG	Walker Williams	RS Jr
RT	Hayden Biegel	RS Fr

Defense
Position	Player	Class
DE	Arthur Goldberg	RS Jr
DT	Conor Sheehy	So
DE	Chikwe Obasih	RS So
OLB	Vince Biegel	RS Jr
ILB	T. J. Edwards	RS Fr
ILB	Leon Jacobs	Jr
OLB	Joe Schobert	Sr
CB	Darius Hillary	RS Sr
SS	Michael Caputo	RS Sr
FS	Leo Musso	RS Jr
CB	Sojourn Shelton	Jr

Special teams
Position	Player	Class
P	Drew Meyer	RS Sr
FG	Rafael Gaglianone	So
KO	Andrew Endicott	Jr
LS	Connor Udelhoven	RS Jr
H	Drew Meyer	RS Sr
PR	Alex Erickson	RS Sr
KR	Natrell Jamerson	So

=== Miami (OH) ===
Miami RedHawks vs Wisconsin Badgers

Quarter	1	2	3	4	Total
RedHawks	0	0	0	0	0
Badgers	13	24	14	7	58

at Camp Randall Stadium • Madison, Wisconsin

- Date: September 12
- Game time: 11:00 a.m. CDT
- Game weather: Temperature: 56, Wind: North 10, Weather: Partly Cloudy
- Game attendance: 76,535
- Referee: A. Cannella
- TV announcers (ESPNU): Clay Matvick (Play-by-play) & John Congemi (Color)

Game information

First Quarter

- WIS – Rafael Gaglianone, 29-yard field goal, 09:47 (WIS 3-0)
- WIS – Rafael Gaglianone, 25-yard field goal, 03:58 (WIS 6-0)
- WIS – Robert Wheelwright, 13-yard pass from Joel Stave (Rafael Gaglianone kick), 00:06 (WIS 13-0)

Second Quarter

- WIS – Austin Traylor, 20-yard pass from Joel Stave (Rafael Gaglianone kick), 10:40 (WIS 20-0)
- WIS – Taiwan Deal, 1-yard run (Rafael Gaglianone kick), 06:32 (WIS 27-0)
- WIS – Robert Wheelwright, 15-yard pass from Joel Stave (Rafael Gaglianone kick), 00:50 (WIS 34-0)
- WIS – Rafael Gaglianone, 38-yard field goal, 00:01 (WIS 37-0)

Third Quarter

- WIS – Taiwan Deal, 1-yard run (Rafael Gaglianone kick), 07:29 (WIS 44-0)
- WIS – Dare Ogunbowale, 35-yard run (Russell, Jack kick), 02:41 (WIS 51-0)

Fourth Quarter

- WIS – Caleb Kinlaw, 5-yard pass from Bart Houston (Jack Russell kick), 04:57 (WIS 58-0)

Passing

- WIS - Joel Stave, 19 completions, 30 attempts, 236 yards, 3 touchdowns, 1 interception
- MIA - Billy Bahl, 7 completions, 20 attempts, 98 yards, 2 interceptions

Rushing

- WIS - Dare Ogunbowale, 16 carries, 112 yards, 1 touchdown
- MIA - Leonard Ross, 8 carries, 16 yards

Receiving

- WIS - Robert Wheelright, 6 catches, 79 yards, 2 touchdowns
- MIA - Sam Martin, 4 catches, 46 yards

Defense

- WIS - Derrick Tindal, 7 tackles, 1 pass breakup
- MIA - Paul Moses, 10 tackles, 1 sack, 1 tackle-for-loss

Wisconsin starting lineup

Offense
Position	Player	Class
QB	Joel Stave	RS Sr
RB	Dare Ogunbowale	Jr
FB	Derek Watt	RS Sr
WR	Alex Erickson	RS Sr
WR	Rob Wheelwright	Jr
TE	Austin Traylor	RS Sr
LT	Tyler Marz	RS Sr
LG	Michael Deiter	RS Fr
C	Dan Voltz	RS Jr
RG	Walker Williams	RS Jr
RT	Hayden Biegel	RS Fr

Defense
Position	Player	Class
DE	Arthur Goldberg	RS Jr
DE	Chikwe Obasih	RS So
OLB	Vince Biegel	RS Jr
ILB	T. J. Edwards	RS Fr
ILB	Leon Jacobs	Jr
OLB	Joe Schobert	Sr
CB	Derrick Tindal	So
CB	Darius Hillary	RS Sr
SS	Michael Caputo	RS Sr
FS	Leo Musso	RS Jr
CB	Sojourn Shelton	Jr

Special teams
Position	Player	Class
P	Drew Meyer	RS Sr
FG	Rafael Gaglianone	So
KO	Andrew Endicott	Jr
LS	Connor Udelhoven	RS Jr
H	Drew Meyer	RS Sr
PR	Alex Erickson	RS Sr
KR	Natrell Jamerson	So

=== Troy ===
Troy Trojans vs Wisconsin Badgers

Quarter	1	2	3	4	Total
Trojans	3	0	0	0	3
#24 Badgers	7	7	7	7	28

at Camp Randall Stadium • Madison, Wisconsin

- Date: September 19
- Game time: 2:30 p.m. CDT
- Game weather: Temperature: 66, Wind: North 12, Weather: Partly Cloudy
- Game attendance: 77,157
- Referee: J. Serinski
- TV announcers (BTN): Matt Devlin (Play-by-play), J Leman (Color) & Jay Wilson (Sideline)

Game information

First Quarter

- WIS – Dare Ogunbowale, 17-yard run (Rafael Gaglianone kick), 06:49 (WIS 7-0)
- TROY – Ryan Kaye, 32-yard field goal, 01:13 (WIS 7-3)

Second Quarter

- WIS – Joel Stave, 4-yard run (Rafael Gaglianone kick), 00:39 (WIS 14-3)

Third Quarter

- WIS – Tanner McEvoy, 32-yard run (Rafael Gaglianone kick), 07:16 (WIS 21-3)

Fourth Quarter

- WIS – Austin Traylor, 1-yard pass from Joel Stave (Rafael Gaglianone kick), 05:07 (WIS 28-3)

Passing

- WIS - Joel Stave, 13 completions, 17 attempts, 202 yards, 1 touchdown
- TROY - Brandon Silvers, 22 completions, 34 attempts, 174 yards

Rushing

- WIS - Taiwan Deal, 16 carries, 84 yards
- TROY - Brandon Burks, 19 carries, 66 yards

Receiving

- WIS - Alex Ericksen, 3 catches, 87 yards
- TROY - Jarvis Bentley, 6 catches, 58 yards

Defense

- WIS - Chris Orr, 14 tackles, 1 tackle-for-loss, 1 pass breakup
- TROY - Montres Kitchens, 6 tackles, 1 sack, 1 tackle-for-loss

Wisconsin starting lineup

Offense
Position	Player	Class
QB	Joel Stave	RS Sr
RB	Dare Ogunbowale	Jr
FB	Derek Watt	RS Sr
WR	Alex Erickson	RS Sr
WR	Rob Wheelwright	Jr
TE	Austin Traylor	RS Sr
LT	Tyler Marz	RS Sr
LG	Michael Deiter	RS Fr
C	Dan Voltz	RS Jr
RG	Micah Kapoi	RS Fr
RT	Hayden Biegel	RS Fr

Defense
Position	Player	Class
DE	Arthur Goldberg	RS Jr
DE	Chikwe Obasih	RS So
OLB	Vince Biegel	RS Jr
ILB	T. J. Edwards	RS Fr
ILB	Leon Jacobs	Jr
OLB	Joe Schobert	Sr
CB	Derrick Tindal	So
CB	Darius Hillary	RS Sr
SS	Michael Caputo	RS Sr
FS	Tanner McEvoy	RS Sr
CB	Sojourn Shelton	Jr

Special teams
Position	Player	Class
P	Drew Meyer	RS Sr
FG	Rafael Gaglianone	So
KO	Andrew Endicott	Jr
LS	Connor Udelhoven	RS Jr
H	Drew Meyer	RS Sr
PR	Alex Erickson	RS Sr
KR	Natrell Jamerson	So

=== Hawaii ===
Hawaii Rainbow Warriors vs Wisconsin Badgers

Quarter	1	2	3	4	Total
Rainbow Warriors	0	0	0	0	0
#22 Badgers	7	7	7	7	28

at Camp Randall Stadium • Madison, Wisconsin

- Date: September 26
- Game time: 7:00 p.m. CDT
- Game weather: Temperature: 73, Wind: 12 ESE, Weather: Clear
- Game attendance: 80,829
- Referee: R. Snodgrass
- TV announcers (BTN): Joe Beninati (Play-by-play), J Leman (Color) & Jay Wilson (Sideline)

Game information

First Quarter

- WIS – Taiwan Deal, 2-yard run (Rafael Gaglianone kick), 04:27 (WIS 7-0)

Second Quarter

- WIS – Taiwan Deal, 2-yard run (Rafael Gaglianone kick), 00:38 (WIS 14-0)

Third Quarter

- WIS – Austin Traylor, 12-yard pass from Joel Stave (Rafael Gaglianone kick), 00:53 (WIS 21-0)

Fourth Quarter

- WIS – Dare Ogunbowale, 9-yard run (Rafael Gaglianone kick), 07:29 (WIS 28-0)

Passing

- WIS - Joel Stave, 14 completions, 23 attempts, 164 yards, 1 touchdown
- HAW - Max Wittek, 15 completions, 32 attempts, 189 yards

Rushing

- WIS - Taiwan Deal, 26 carries, 147 yards, 2 touchdowns
- HAW - Paul Harris, 6 carries, 22 yards

Receiving

- WIS - Alex Ericksen, 9 catches, 87 yards
- HAW - Quiton Pedroza, 10 catches, 134 yards

Defense

- WIS - Joe Schobert, 3 tackles, 2 tackles-for-loss, 2 sacks
- HAW - Marrell Jackson, 13 tackles

Wisconsin starting lineup

Offense
Position	Player	Class
QB	Joel Stave	RS Sr
RB	Taiwan Deal	Jr
FB	Derek Watt	RS Sr
FB	Austin Ramesh	RS So
WR	Reggie Love	RS Jr
TE	Austin Traylor	RS Sr
LT	Tyler Marz	RS Sr
LG	Michael Deiter	RS Fr
C	Dan Voltz	RS Jr
RG	Micah Kapoi	RS Fr
RT	Hayden Biegel	RS Fr

Defense
Position	Player	Class
DE	Arthur Goldberg	RS Jr
DE	Chikwe Obasih	RS So
OLB	Vince Biegel	RS Jr
ILB	Chris Orr	Fr
ILB	T. J. Edwards	RS Fr
OLB	Joe Schobert	Sr
S	Leo Musso	RS Jr
CB	Darius Hillary	RS Sr
SS	Michael Caputo	RS Sr
FS	Tanner McEvoy	RS Sr
CB	Sojourn Shelton	Jr

Special teams
Position	Player	Class
P	Drew Meyer	RS Sr
FG	Rafael Gaglianone	So
KO	Andrew Endicott	Jr
LS	Connor Udelhoven	RS Jr
H	Drew Meyer	RS Sr
PR	Alex Erickson	RS Sr
KR	Natrell Jamerson	So

=== Iowa ===
Iowa Hawkeyes vs Wisconsin Badgers

Quarter	1	2	3	4	Total
Hawkeyes	0	10	0	0	10
#19 Badgers	3	0	3	0	6

at Camp Randall Stadium • Madison, Wisconsin

- Date: October 3
- Game time: 11:00 a.m. CDT
- Game weather: Temperature: 50, Wind: 14 ENE, Weather: Partly Cloudy
- Game attendance: 80,933
- Referee: D. Willard
- TV announcers (ESPN): Steve Levy (Play-by-play), Brock Huard (Color) & Shannon Spake (Sideline)

Game information

First Quarter

- WIS – Rafael Gaglianone, 46-yard field goal, 09:58 (WIS 3-0)

Second Quarter

- IOWA – George Kittle, 1 yd pass from C. J. Beathard (Marshall Koehn kick), 02:59 (IOWA 3-7)
- IOWA – Marshall Koehn, 33-yard field goal, 01:03 (IOWA 3-10)

Third Quarter

- WIS – Rafael Gaglianone, 46-yard field goal, 03:40 (IOWA 6-10)

Fourth Quarter

- NONE

Passing

- WIS - Joel Stave, 21 completions, 38 attempts, 234 yards, 2 interceptions
- IOWA - C. J. Beathard, 9 completions, 21 attempts, 77 yards, 1 touchdown, 1 interception

Rushing

- WIS - Taiwan Deal, 15 carries, 59 yards
- IOWA - Jordan Canzeri, 26 carries, 125 yards

Receiving

- WIS - Dare Ogunbowale, 4 catches, 43 yards
- IOWA - Matt VandeBerg, 6 catches, 61 yards

Defense

- WIS - Joe Schobert, 8 tackles, 3.5 tackles-for-loss, 3 sacks, 5 QB hurries, 2 force fumbles, 1 fumble recovery
- IOWA - Cole Fisher, 14 tackles, .5 sack, 1 tackle-for-loss

Wisconsin starting lineup

Offense
Position	Player	Class
QB	Joel Stave	RS Sr
RB	Dare Ogunbowale	Jr
FB	Derek Watt	RS Sr
WR	Alex Erickson	RS Sr
WR	Rob Wheelwright	Jr
TE	Austin Traylor	RS Sr
LT	Tyler Marz	RS Sr
LG	Michael Deiter	RS Fr
C	Dan Voltz	RS Jr
RG	Micah Kapoi	RS Fr
RT	Jacob Maxwell	RS Fr

Defense
Position	Player	Class
DE	Arthur Goldberg	RS Jr
NT	Olive Sagapolu	Fr
DE	Chikwe Obasih	RS So
OLB	Vince Biegel	RS Jr
ILB	T. J. Edwards	RS Fr
ILB	Chris Orr	Fr
OLB	Joe Schobert	Sr
CB	Darius Hillary	RS Sr
SS	Michael Caputo	RS Sr
FS	Tanner McEvoy	RS Sr
CB	Sojourn Shelton	Jr

Special teams
Position	Player	Class
P	Drew Meyer	RS Sr
FG	Rafael Gaglianone	So
KO	Andrew Endicott	Jr
LS	Connor Udelhoven	RS Jr
H	Drew Meyer	RS Sr
PR	Alex Erickson	RS Sr
KR	Natrell Jamerson	So

=== At Nebraska ===
Wisconsin Badgers vs Nebraska Cornhuskers

Quarter	1	2	3	4	Total
Badgers	0	7	3	13	23
Cornhuskers	0	14	0	7	21

at Memorial Stadium • Lincoln, Nebraska

- Date: October 10
- Game time: 2:30 p.m. CDT
- Game weather: Temperature: 76, Wind: SSW 7–10, Weather: Sunny
- Game attendance: 89,886
- Referee: John O'Neill
- TV announcers (ABC/ESPN2): Adam Amin (Play-by-play), Kelly Stouffer (Color) & Olivia Harlan (Sideline)

Game information

First Quarter

- None

Second Quarter

- WIS – Troy Fumagalli, 7–yard pass from Joel Stave (Rafael Gaglianone kick), 09:45 (WIS 7–0)
- NEB – Tommy Armstrong Jr., 7–yard run (Drew Brown kick), 02:40 (TIE 7–7)
- NEB – Alonzo Moore, 41–yard pass from Tommy Armstrong Jr. (Drew Brown kick), 00:31 (NEB 14–7)

Third Quarter

- WIS – Rafael Gaglianone, 45–yard field goal, 01:06 (NEB 14–10)

Fourth Quarter

- WIS – Alec Ingold, 1–yard Run (Rafael Gaglianone kick), 10:08 (WIS 17–14)
- WIS – Rafael Gaglianone, 42–yard field goal, 06:17 (WIS 20–14)
- NEB – Andy Jamovich, 55–yard run (Drew Brown kick), 03:38 (NEB 21–20)
- WIS – Rafael Gaglianone, 46–yard field goal, 00:04 (WIS 23–21)

Passing

- WIS - Joel Stave, 24 completions, 50 attempts, 322 yards, 1 touchdown
- NEB - Tommy Armstrong Jr., 11 completions, 28 attempts, 129 yards, 1 touchdown

Rushing

- WIS - Dare Ogunbowale, 18 carries, 117 yards
- NEB - Andy Janovich, 3 carries, 59 yards, 1 touchdown

Receiving

- WIS - Alex Erickson, 7 catches, 113 yards
- NEB - Alonzo Moore, 1 catch, 41 yards, touchdown

Defense

- WIS - T. J. Edwards, 9 tackles
- NEB - Byerson Cockrell, 10 tackles, 1 tackle for loss, 1 pass breakup

Wisconsin starting lineup

Offense
Position	Player	Class
QB	Joel Stave	RS Sr
RB	Taiwan Deal	RS Fr
FB	Derek Watt	RS Sr
WR	Alex Erickson	RS Sr
WR	Rob Wheelwright	Jr
TE	Eric Steffes	RS Jr
LT	Tyler Marz	RS Sr
LG	Michael Deiter	RS Fr
C	Dan Voltz	RS Jr
RG	Micah Kapoi	RS Fr
RT	Beau Benzschawel	RS Fr

Defense
Position	Player	Class
DE	Arthur Goldberg	RS Jr
NT	Olive Sagapolu	Fr
DE	Chikwe Obasih	RS So
OLB	Vince Biegel	RS Jr
ILB	T. J. Edwards	RS Fr
ILB	Chris Orr	Fr
OLB	Joe Schobert	Sr
CB	Darius Hillary	RS Sr
SS	Michael Caputo	RS Sr
FS	Tanner McEvoy	RS Sr
CB	Sojourn Shelton	Jr

Special teams
Position	Player	Class
P	Drew Meyer	RS Sr
FG	Rafael Gaglianone	So
KO	Andrew Endicott	Jr
LS	Connor Udelhoven	RS Jr
H	Drew Meyer	RS Sr
PR	Alex Erickson	RS Sr
KR	Natrell Jamerson	So

=== Purdue ===
Purdue Boilermakers vs Wisconsin Badgers

Quarter	1	2	3	4	Total
Boilermakers	0	7	0	0	7
Badgers	7	3	7	7	24

at Camp Randall Stadium • Madison, Wisconsin

- Date: October 17
- Game time: 11:00 a.m. CDT
- Game weather: Temperature: 41, Wind: W 6, Weather: Partly Cloudy
- Game attendance: 80,794
- Referee: J. McGinn
- TV announcers (BTN): Kevin Kugler (Play-by-play), Matt Millen (Color) & Lisa Byington (Sideline)

Game information

First Quarter

- WIS – Alec Ingold, 4–yard Run (Rafael Gaglianone kick), 09:25 (WIS 7–0)

Second Quarter

- PUR – David Blough, 2–yard Run (Paul Griggs kick), 12:44 (TIE 7–7)
- WIS – Rafael Gaglianone, 28–yard field goal, 06:54 (WIS 10–7)

Third Quarter

- WIS – Dare Ogunbowale, 4–yard Run (Rafael Gaglianone kick), 00:00 (WIS 17–7)

Fourth Quarter

- WIS – Alec Ingold, 1–yard Run (Rafael Gaglianone kick), 07:16 (WIS 24–7)

Passing

- WIS - Joel Stave, 30 completions, 39 attempts, 322 yards, 1 interception
- PUR - David Blough, 15 completions, 26 attempts, 136 yards

Rushing

- WIS - Dare Ogunbowale, 18 carries, 56 yards, 1 touchdown
- PUR - Markell Jones, 12 carries, 46 yards

Receiving

- WIS - Alex Erickson, 9 catches, 86 yards
- PUR - D.J. Knox, 2 catches, 35 yards

Defense

- WIS - T. J. Edwards, 16 tackles, 1.5 tackles for loss, 1 forced fumble
- PUR - Anthony Brown, 11 tackles, blocked kick

Wisconsin starting lineup

Offense
Position	Player	Class
QB	Joel Stave	RS Sr
RB	Dare Ogunbowale	Jr
FB	Derek Watt	RS Sr
WR	Alex Erickson	RS Sr
WR	Rob Wheelwright	Jr
TE	Eric Steffes	RS Jr
LT	Tyler Marz	RS Sr
LG	Michael Deiter	RS Fr
C	Walker Williams	RS Jr
RG	Micah Kapoi	RS Fr
RT	Beau Benzschawel	RS Fr

Defense
Position	Player	Class
DE	Arthur Goldberg	RS Jr
NT	Conor Sheehy	So
DE	Chikwe Obasih	RS So
OLB	Vince Biegel	RS Jr
ILB	T. J. Edwards	RS Fr
ILB	Chris Orr	Fr
OLB	Joe Schobert	Sr
CB	Darius Hillary	RS Sr
SS	Michael Caputo	RS Sr
FS	Tanner McEvoy	RS Sr
CB	Sojourn Shelton	Jr

Special teams
Position	Player	Class
P	Drew Meyer	RS Sr
FG	Rafael Gaglianone	So
KO	Andrew Endicott	Jr
LS	Connor Udelhoven	RS Jr
H	Drew Meyer	RS Sr
PR	Alex Erickson	RS Sr
KR	Natrell Jamerson	So

=== At Illinois ===
Wisconsin Badgers vs Illinois Fighting Illini

Quarter	1	2	3	4	Total
Badgers	0	10	7	7	24
Fighting Illini	3	3	7	0	13

at Memorial Stadium • Champaign, Illinois

- Date: October 24
- Game time: 2:30 p.m. CDT
- Game weather: Temperature: 64, Wind: W 21, Weather: Cloudy
- Game attendance: 45,438
- Referee: Jeff Servinski
- TV announcers (BTN): Kevin Kugler (Play-by-play), Matt Millen (Color) & Lisa Byington (Sideline)

Game information

First Quarter

- ILL – Taylor Zalewski, 37–yard field goal, 04:21 (ILL 3–0)

Second Quarter

- WIS – Rob Wheelwright, 23–yard pass from Bart Houston (Rafael Gaglianone kick), 14:09 (WIS 7–3)
- WIS – Rafael Gaglianone, 25–yard field goal, 04:23 (WIS 10–3)
- ILL – Taylor Zalewski, 37–yard field goal, 04:21 (WIS 10–6)

Third Quarter

- ILL – Ke'Shawn Vaughn, 36–yard run (Taylor Zalewski kick), 07:48 (ILL 13–10)
- WIS – Alec Ingold, 2–yard run (Rafael Gaglianone kick), 04:05 (WIS 17–13)

Fourth Quarter

- WIS – Alex Erickson, 9–yard pass from Bart Houston (Rafael Gaglianone kick), 09:42 (WIS 24–13)

Passing

- WIS - Bart Houston, 22 completions, 30 attempts, 232 yards, 2 touchdowns, 2 interceptions
- ILL - Wes Lunt, 22 completions, 43 attempts, 278 yards, 1 interception

Rushing

- WIS - Alex Erickson, 4 carries, 81 yards
- ILL - Ke'Shawn Vaughn, 13 carries, 60 yards, 1 touchdown

Receiving

- WIS - Alex Erickson, 10 catches, 96 yards, 1 touchdown
- ILL - Geronimo Allison, 8 catches, 99 yards

Defense

- WIS - Michael Caputo, 4 tackles, 1 forced fumble, 1 interception
- ILL - Clayton Fejedelem, 19 tackles, 1 interception

Wisconsin starting lineup

Offense
Position	Player	Class
QB	Joel Stave	RS Sr
RB	Dare Ogunbowale	Jr
WR	Alex Erickson	RS Sr
WR	Rob Wheelwright	Jr
TE	Troy Fumagalli	RS So
TE	Eric Steffes	RS Jr
LT	Tyler Marz	RS Sr
LG	Michael Deiter	RS Fr
C	Dan Voltz	RS Jr
RG	Walker Williams	RS Jr
RT	Beau Benzschawel	RS Fr

Defense
Position	Player	Class
NT	Conor Sheehy	So
DE	Chikwe Obasih	RS So
OLB	Vince Biegel	RS Jr
ILB	T. J. Edwards	RS Fr
ILB	Chris Orr	Fr
OLB	Joe Schobert	Sr
CB	Darius Hillary	RS Sr
SS	Michael Caputo	RS Sr
FS	Tanner McEvoy	RS Sr
CB	Sojourn Shelton	Jr
CB	Derrick Tindal	So

Special teams
Position	Player	Class
P	Drew Meyer	RS Sr
FG	Rafael Gaglianone	So
KO	Andrew Endicott	Jr
LS	Connor Udelhoven	RS Jr
H	Drew Meyer	RS Sr
PR	Alex Erickson	RS Sr
KR	Natrell Jamerson	So

=== Rutgers ===
Rutgers Scarlet Knights vs Wisconsin Badgers

Quarter	1	2	3	4	Total
Scarlet Knights	3	0	7	0	10
Badgers	10	17	14	7	48

at Camp Randall Stadium • Madison, Wisconsin

- Date: October 31
- Game time: 11:00 a.m. CDT
- Game weather: Temperature: 45, Wind: S 14, Weather: Light rain
- Game attendance: 74,575
- Referee: T. Geerlings
- TV: BTN

Game information

First Quarter

- WIS – Rafael Gaglianone, 49–yard field goal, 11:26 (WIS 3–0)
- WIS – Corey Clement, 12–yard run (Rafael Gaglianone kick), 09:15 (WIS 10–0)
- RUT – Kyle Federico, 21–yard field goal, 02:19 (WIS 10–3)

Second Quarter

- WIS – Alex Erickson, 31–yard pass from Joel Stave (Rafael Gaglianone kick), 10:29 (WIS 17–3)
- WIS – Corey Clement, 21–yard run (Rafael Gaglianone kick), 03:30 (WIS 24–3)
- WIS – Rafael Gaglianone, 27–yard field goal, 00:00 (WIS 27–3)

Third Quarter

- WIS – Corey Clement, 1–yard run (Rafael Gaglianone kick), 08:52 (WIS 34–3)
- RUT – Blessuan Austin, 50–yard interception return (Kyle Federico kick), 03:01 (WIS 34–10)
- WIS – Dare Ogunbowale, 4–yard run (Rafael Gaglianone kick), 01:46 (WIS 41–10)

Fourth Quarter

- WIS – Tanner McEvoy, 20–yard run (Rafael Gaglianone kick), 09:47 (WIS 48–10)

Passing

- WIS - Joel Stave, 13 completions, 25 attempts, 217 yards, 1 touchdown, 2 interceptions
- RUT - Chris Laviano, 4 completions, 14 attempts, 31 yards, 1 interception

Rushing

- WIS - Corey Clement, 11 carries, 115 yards, 3 touchdowns
- RUT - Josh Hicks, 15 carries, 72 yards

Receiving

- WIS - Alex Erickson, 6 catches, 103 yards, 1 touchdown
- RUT - Carlton Agudosi, 1 catch, 49 yards

Defense

- WIS - Jack Cichy, 8 tackles, 1 pass breakup
- RUT - Quentin Gause, 15 tackles, 2 tackles for loss, 1 pass breakup

Wisconsin starting lineup

Offense
Position	Player	Class
QB	Joel Stave	RS Sr
RB	Dare Ogunbowale	Jr
FB	Derek Watt	RS Sr
WR	Alex Erickson	RS Sr
WR	Jazz Peavy	RS So
TE	Troy Fumagalli	RS So
LT	Tyler Marz	RS Sr
LG	Micah Kapoi	RS Fr
C	Michael Deiter	RS Fr
RG	Walker Williams	RS Jr
RT	Beau Benzschawel	RS Fr

Defense
Position	Player	Class
DE	Alec James	RS So
NT	Conor Sheehy	So
DE	Chikwe Obasih	RS So
OLB	Vince Biegel	RS Jr
ILB	T. J. Edwards	RS Fr
ILB	Jack Cichy	RS So
OLB	Joe Schobert	Sr
CB	Darius Hillary	RS Sr
SS	Michael Caputo	RS Sr
FS	Tanner McEvoy	RS Sr
CB	Sojourn Shelton	Jr

Special teams
Position	Player	Class
P	Drew Meyer	RS Sr
FG	Rafael Gaglianone	So
KO	Jack Russell	Sr
KO	P.J. Rosowski	RS Fr
LS	Connor Udelhoven	RS Jr
H	Drew Meyer	RS Sr
PR	Alex Erickson	RS Sr
PR	Jazz Peavy	RS So
KR	Natrell Jamerson	So

=== At Maryland ===
Wisconsin Badgers vs Maryland Terrapins

Quarter	1	2	3	4	Total
Badgers	14	3	7	7	31
Terrapins	7	10	0	7	24

at Byrd Stadium • College Park, Maryland

- Date: November 7
- Game time: 2:30 p.m. CST
- Game weather: Temperature: 55, Wind: SW 5, Weather: Light rain
- Game attendance: 44,678
- Referee: Daniel Caprin
- TV: BTN

Game information

First Quarter

- MD – Wes Brown, 7–yard run (Brad Craddock kick), 09:17 (MAR 7–0)
- WIS – Natrell Jamerson, 98–yard kickoff return (Rafael Gaglianone kick), 09:04 (TIE 7–7)
- WIS – Dare Ogunbowale, 21–yard run (Rafael Gaglianone kick), 03:56 (WIS 14–7)

Second Quarter

- MD – Adam Greene, 44–yard field goal, 13:34 (WIS 14–10)
- WIS – Rafael Gaglianone, 28–yard field goal, 07:05 (WIS 17–10)
- MD – D.J. Moore, 40–yard pass from Perry Hills (Adam Greene kick), 00:49 (TIE 17–17)

Third Quarter

- WIS – Alec Ingold, 1–yard run (Rafael Gaglianone kick), 05:17 (WIS 24–17)

Fourth Quarter

- WIS – Dare Ogunbowale, 7–yard pass from Joel Stave (Rafael Gaglianone kick), 14:01 (WIS 31–17)
- MD – Taivon Jacobs, 31–yard pass from Caleb Rowe (Adam Greene kick), 02:39 (WIS 31–24)

Passing

- WIS - Joel Stave, 15 completions, 24 attempts, 188 yards, 1 touchdown, 1 interception
- MD - Perry Hills, 6 completions, 16 attempts, 107 yards, 1 touchdown, 1 interception

Rushing

- WIS - Dare Ogunbowale, 19 carries, 47 yards, 1 touchdown
- MD - William Likely, 3 carries, 56 yards

Receiving

- WIS - Alex Erickson, 5 catches, 83 yards
- MD - DeAndre Lane, 3 catches, 63 yards

Defense

- WIS - Jack Cichy, 10 tackles, 3 tackles for loss, 2 sacks
- MD - Quinton Jefferson, 6 tackles, 2 tackles for loss, 1 sack

Wisconsin starting lineup

Offense
Position	Player	Class
QB	Joel Stave	RS Sr
RB	Dare Ogunbowale	Jr
FB	Austin Ramesh	RS So
WR	Alex Erickson	RS Sr
WR	Tanner McEvoy	RS Sr
TE	Troy Fumagalli	RS So
LT	Tyler Marz	RS Sr
LG	Micah Kapoi	RS Fr
C	Michael Deiter	RS Fr
RG	Walker Williams	RS Jr
RT	Beau Benzschawel	RS Fr

Defense
Position	Player	Class
NT	Conor Sheehy	So
DE	Chikwe Obasih	RS So
OLB	Vince Biegel	RS Jr
ILB	T. J. Edwards	RS Fr
ILB	Jack Cichy	RS So
OLB	Joe Schobert	Sr
CB	Darius Hillary	RS Sr
SS	Michael Caputo	RS Sr
FS	Tanner McEvoy	RS Sr
CB	Sojourn Shelton	Jr
CB	Derrick Tindal	So

Special teams
Position	Player	Class
P	Drew Meyer	RS Sr
FG	Rafael Gaglianone	So
KO	Jack Russell	Sr
KO	P.J. Rosowski	RS Fr
LS	Connor Udelhoven	RS Jr
H	Drew Meyer	RS Sr
PR	Alex Erickson	RS Sr
KR	Natrell Jamerson	So

=== #20 Northwestern ===
Northwestern Wildcats vs Wisconsin Badgers

Quarter	1	2	3	4	Total
#20 Wildcats	7	3	0	3	13
#21 Badgers	0	0	7	0	7

at Camp Randall Stadium • Madison, Wisconsin

- Date: November 21
- Game time: 2:30 p.m. CST
- Game weather: Temperature: 28, Wind: NW 10, Weather: Mostly cloudy
- Game attendance: 75,276
- Referee: J. McGinn
- TV: BTN

Game information

First Quarter

- NU – Justin Jackson, 8–yard run (Jack Mitchell kick), 09:12 (NU 7–0)

Second Quarter

- NU – Jack Mitchell, 35–yard field goal, 00:00 (NU 10–0)

Third Quarter

- WIS – Corey Clement, 9–yard run (Rafael Gaglianone kick), 08:24 (NU 10–7)

Fourth Quarter

- NU – Jack Mitchell, 37–yard field goal, 04:00 (NU 13–7)

Passing

- WIS - Joel Stave, 20 completions, 34 attempts, 229 yards, 2 interceptions
- NU - Clayton Thorson, 9 completions, 20 attempts, 60 yards

Rushing

- WIS - Corey Clement, 10 carries, 24 yards, 1 touchdown
- NU - Justin Jackson, 35 carries, 139 yards, 1 touchdown

Receiving

- WIS - Jazz Peavy, 5 catches, 88 yards
- NU - Garrett Dickerson, 2 catches, 24 yards

Defense

- WIS - Vince Biegel, 14 tackles, 1.5 tackles for loss, 1 sack
- NU - Anthony Walker, 8 tackles, 0.5 tackles for loss, 1 interception, 1 pass breakup

Wisconsin starting lineup

Offense
Position	Player	Class
QB	Joel Stave	RS Sr
RB	Dare Ogunbowale	Jr
WR	Alex Erickson	RS Sr
WR	Jazz Peavy	RS So
TE	Troy Fumagalli	RS So
TE	Austin Traylor	RS Sr
LT	Tyler Marz	RS Sr
LG	Micah Kapoi	RS Fr
C	Michael Deiter	RS Fr
RG	Walker Williams	RS Jr
RT	Beau Benzschawel	RS Fr

Defense
Position	Player	Class
DE	Arthur Goldberg	RS Jr
NT	Conor Sheehy	So
DE	Chikwe Obasih	RS So
OLB	Vince Biegel	RS Jr
ILB	T. J. Edwards	RS Fr
ILB	Jack Cichy	RS So
OLB	Joe Schobert	Sr
CB	Darius Hillary	RS Sr
SS	Michael Caputo	RS Sr
FS	Tanner McEvoy	RS Sr
CB	Sojourn Shelton	Jr

Special teams
Position	Player	Class
P	Drew Meyer	RS Sr
FG	Rafael Gaglianone	So
KO	Jack Russell	Sr
LS	Connor Udelhoven	RS Jr
H	Drew Meyer	RS Sr
PR	Alex Erickson	RS Sr
KR	Natrell Jamerson	So

=== At Minnesota ===
Wisconsin Badgers vs Minnesota Golden Gophers

Quarter	1	2	3	4	Total
#25 Badgers	7	21	3	0	31
Golden Gophers	7	7	0	7	21

at TCF Bank Stadium • Minneapolis, Minnesota

- Date: November 28
- Game time: 2:30 p.m. CST
- Game weather: Temperature: 32, Wind: SSW 8, Weather: Sunny and crisp
- Game attendance: 52,850
- Referee: Don Willard
- TV: BTN

Game information

First Quarter

- MIN – Briean Boddy-Calhoun, 16–yard interception return (Ryan Santoso kick), 13:27 (MIN 7–0)
- WIS – Alec Ingold, 1–yard run (Rafael Gaglianone kick), 08:23 (TIE 7–7)

Second Quarter

- WIS – Taiwan Deal, 1–yard run (Rafael Gaglianone kick), 14:57 (WIS 14–7)
- MIN – Rodney Smith, 6–yard run (Ryan Santoso kick), 10:34 (TIE 14–14)
- WIS – Taiwan Deal, 13–yard run (Rafael Gaglianone kick), 04:56 (WIS 21–14)
- WIS – Dare Ogunbowale, 18–yard run (Rafael Gaglianone kick), 02:44 (WIS 28–14)

Third Quarter

- WIS – Rafael Gaglianone, 46–yard field goal, 08:27 (WIS 31–14)

Fourth Quarter

- MIN – Drew Wolitarsky, 27–yard pass from Mitch Leidner (Ryan Santoso kick), 05:33 (WIS 31–21)

Passing

- WIS - Joel Stave, 9 completions, 17 attempts, 79 yards, 1 interception
- MIN - Mitch Leidner, 16 completions, 37 attempts, 223 yards, 1 touchdown, 3 interceptions

Rushing

- WIS - Dare Ogunbowale, 33 carries, 155 yards, 1 touchdown
- MIN - Rodney Smith, 7 carries, 35 yards, 1 touchdown

Receiving

- WIS - Alex Erickson, 6 catches, 66 yards
- MIN - Shannon Brooks, 3 catches, 53 yards

Defense

- WIS - Joe Schobert, 5 tackles, 1 forced fumble, 1 interception
- MIN - De'Vondre Campbell, 13 tackles, 0.5 tackle for loss

Wisconsin starting lineup

Offense
Position	Player	Class
QB	Joel Stave	RS Sr
RB	Dare Ogunbowale	Jr
FB	Derek Watt	RS Sr
WR	Alex Erickson	RS Sr
WR	Jazz Peavy	RS So
TE	Austin Traylor	RS Sr
LT	Tyler Marz	RS Sr
LG	Micah Kapoi	RS Fr
C	Michael Deiter	RS Fr
RG	Beau Benzschawel	RS Fr
RT	Jacob Maxwell	RS Fr

Defense
Position	Player	Class
DE	Conor Sheehy	So
NT	Olive Sagapolu	Fr
DE	Chikwe Obasih	RS So
OLB	Vince Biegel	RS Jr
ILB	T. J. Edwards	RS Fr
ILB	Jack Cichy	RS So
OLB	Joe Schobert	Sr
CB	Darius Hillary	RS Sr
FS	Michael Caputo	RS Sr
SS	Tanner McEvoy	RS Sr
CB	Sojourn Shelton	Jr

Special teams
Position	Player	Class
P	Drew Meyer	RS Sr
FG	Rafael Gaglianone	So
KO	Andrew Endicott	Jr
KO	P.J. Rosowski	RS Fr
KO	Jack Russell	SR
LS	Connor Udelhoven	RS Jr
H	Drew Meyer	RS Sr
PR	Alex Erickson	RS Sr
KR	Natrell Jamerson	So

=== Holiday Bowl ===
2015 Holiday Bowl

Quarter	1	2	3	4	Total
Trojans	0	7	7	7	21
#23 Badgers	0	13	7	3	23

at Qualcomm Stadium • San Diego, California

- Date: December 30
- Game time: 9:30 p.m. CST
- Game weather: Temperature: 52, Wind: N 4, Weather: Clear and cool
- Game attendance: 48,329
- Referee: John McDaid
- TV: ESPN

Game information

First Quarter

- None

Second Quarter

- WIS – Rafael Gaglianone, 28–yard field goal, 13:30 (WIS 3–0)
- WIS – Corey Clement, 6–yard run (Rafael Gaglianone kick), 08:56 (WIS 10–0)
- USC – Justin Davis, 1–yard run (Alex Wood kick), 05:17 (WIS 10–7)
- WIS – Rafael Gaglianone, 33–yard field goal, 00:26 (WIS 13–7)

Third Quarter

- WIS – Austin Traylor, 4–yard pass from Joel Stave (Rafael Gaglianone kick), 07:49 (WIS 20–7)
- USC – Justin Davis, 4–yard run (Alex Wood kick), 05:34 (WIS 20–14)

Fourth Quarter

- USC – Darreus Rogers, 7–yard pass from Cody Kessler (Alex Wood kick), 10:19 (USC 21–20)
- WIS – Rafael Gaglianone, 29–yard field goal, 02:27 (WIS 23–21)

Passing

- WIS - Joel Stave, 18 completions, 27 attempts, 217 yards, 1 touchdown
- USC - Cody Kessler, 18 completions, 32 attempts, 221 yards, 1 touchdown, 1 interception

Rushing

- WIS - Corey Clement, 19 carries, 66 yards, 1 touchdown
- USC - Justin Davis, 12 carries, 27 yards, 2 touchdowns

Receiving

- WIS - Alex Erickson, 5 catches, 54 yards
- USC - JuJu Smith-Schuster, 4 catches, 65 yards

Defense

- WIS - Jack Cichy, 9 tackles, 3 tackles for loss, 3 sacks
- USC - Delvon Simmons, 11 tackles, 2 tackles for loss, 1 pass breakup

== Coaching staff ==
Name	Position	First season	Alma Mater
Paul Chryst	Head coach / quarterbacks coach	2015	Wisconsin
Dave Aranda	Defensive coordinator / inside linebackers coach	2013	Cal Lutheran
Joe Rudolph	Associate head coach / offensive coordinator / offensive line coach	2015	Wisconsin
John Settle	Running backs coach	2015	Appalachian State
Mickey Turner	Tight ends coach	2015	Wisconsin
Ted Gilmore	Wide receivers coach	2015	Wyoming
Daronte Jones	Defensive backs coach	2015	Morgan State
Tim Tibesar	Outside linebackers coach	2015	North Dakota
Inoke Breckterfield	Defensive line coach	2015	Oregon State
Chris Haering	Special teams coordinator	2015	West Virginia
Ross Kolodziej	Strength and conditioning coach	2015	Wisconsin

== Roster ==
2015 Wisconsin Badgers football team roster
Players
Coaches
Offense

Pos.	#	Name	Class
QB	2	Joel Stave (C)	Sr
WR/S	3	Tanner McEvoy	Sr
RB	6	Corey Clement	Jr
QB	7	D.J. Gillins	Fr
WR	9	Jordan Fredrick	Sr
WR	11	Jazz Peavy	So
QB	12	Alex Hornibrook	Fr
QB	13	Bart Houston	Jr
QB	14	Thad Armstrong	Jr
WR	15	Robert Wheelright	Jr
WR	16	Reggie Love	Jr
FB	20	Austin Ramesh	So
RB	21	Mark Saari	Fr
RB	22	Caleb Kinlaw	Fr
RB	23	Dare Ogunbowale	Jr
WR	24	Ricky Finco	So
FB	26	Derek Straus	Sr
RB	27	Bradrick Shaw	Fr
RB	28	Taiwan Deal	Fr
RB	30	Serge Trezy	Jr
FB	34	Derek Watt	Sr
FB	36	Troy Laufenberg	Fr
TE	38	John Damrow	Fr
WR	41	Henry Houden	Fr
WR	43	Peter Roy	Fr
TE	44	Eric Steffes	Jr
RB	45	Alec Ingold	Fr
TE	46	Austin Traylor	Sr
TE	47	Mitchell Herl	Fr
TE	49	Kyle Penniston	Fr
OL	52	Jacob Maxwell	Fr
OL	58	George Panos	Fr
OL	61	Tyler Marz	Sr
OL	62	Walker Williams	Jr
OL	63	Michael Deiter	Fr
OL	64	Brett Connors	Fr
OL	65	Ryan Ramczyk	Fr
OL	66	Beau Benzschawel	Fr
OL	67	Jon Dietzen	Fr
OL	68	David Moorman	Fr
OL	69	Aidan McNamara	So
OL	70	Dan Voltz	Jr
OL	71	Ray Ball	Sr
OL	73	Kevin Estes	Fr
OL	74	Hayden Biegel	Fr
OL	75	Micah Kapoi	Fr
OL	76	Logan Schmidt	Jr
OL	77	Ian Dretzka	Fr
OL	78	Jason Erdmann	Fr
OL	79	Ben Hemer	So
TE	81	Troy Fumagalli	So
WR	82	A. J. Jordan	Sr
WR	84	Andrew James	Fr
WR	85	Krenwick Sanders	So
WR	86	Alex Erickson (C)	Sr
WR	87	George Rushing	So
TE	89	David Edwards	Fr

Defense

Pos.	#	Name	Class
WR/S	3	Tanner McEvoy	Sr
CB	5	Darius Hillary	Sr
S	7	Michael Caputo (C)	Sr
CB	8	Sojourn Shelton	Jr
CB	9	Titus Booker	Fr
CB	11	T.J. Reynard	Sr
CB	12	Natrell Jamerson	So
S	13	Evan Bondoc	Fr
ILB	14	D'Cota Dixon	So
S	19	Leo Musso	Jr
OLB	21	Arrington Farrar	Fr
ILB	24	Keelon Brookins	So
CB	25	Derrick Tindal	So
CB	26	Elijah Strong	Fr
CB	29	Terrance Floyd	Sr
ILB	29	Max Praschak	Fr
OLB	30	Jake Whalen	Fr
S	31	Lubern Figaro	So
ILB	32	Leon Jacobs	Jr
DE	34	Chikwe Obasih	So
S	36	Joe Ferguson	So
S	37	Bret Verstegen	Fr
OLB	41	Jesse Hayes	Sr
OLB	42	T. J. Watt	So
OLB	43	Ryan Connelly	Fr
ILB	45	Nick Thomas	Fr
OLB	47	Vince Biegel	Jr
OLB	48	Jack Cichy	So
ILB	50	Chris Orr	Fr
DE	52	David Pfaff	Fr
ILB	53	T. J. Edwards	Fr
ILB	54	Ty DeForest	Fr
OLB	55	Garret Dooley	So
OLB	56	Zack Baun	Fr
DE	57	Alec James	So
OLB	58	Joe Schobert (C)	Sr
OLB	59	Tyler Johnson	Fr
NT	65	Olive Sagapolu	Fr
DE	66	Kelly Thomas	Fr
NT	74	Gunnar Roberge	Fr
DE	91	Zander Neuville	Fr
NT	92	Jeremy Patterson	Fr
DE	93	Jake Keefer	Sr
NT	94	Conor Sheehy	So
DE	95	Arthur Goldberg	Jr
DE	96	Billy Hirschfeld	Fr
DE	97	Andrew Ruzek	Fr
DE	98	Kraig Howe	Fr

Special teams

Pos.	#	Name	Class
K	10	Rafael Gaglianone	So
K	37	Andrew Endicott	Jr
P	38	P. J. Rosowski	Fr
K	39	Zach Hintze	Fr
LS	60	Connor Udelhoven	Jr
P	90	Drew Meyer	Sr
P	96	Connor Allen	Fr
K	97	Jack Russell	Sr

Head coach

- Paul Chryst (Wisconsin)
  Also quarterbacks coach

Coordinators/assistant coaches

- Dave Aranda (Cal Lutheran)
  Defensive coordinator, inside linebackers
- Joe Rudolph (Wisconsin)
  Associate head coach, offensive coordinator, offensive line coach
- John Settle (Appalachian State)
  Running backs coach
- Mickey Turner (Wisconsin)
  Tight ends coach
- Ted Gilmore (Wyoming)
  Wide receivers coach
- Daronte Jones (Morgan State)
  Defensive backs coach
- Tim Tibesar (North Dakota)
  Outside linebackers coach
- Inoke Breckterfield (Oregon State)
  Defensive line coach
- Chris Haering (West Virginia)
  Special teams coordinator
- Ross Kolodziej (Wisconsin)
  Strength and conditioning coach
- Antonio Fenelus (Wisconsin)
  Graduate assistant

Legend

- (C) Team captain
- (S) Suspended
- (I) Ineligible
- Injured
- Redshirt

Roster
Last update: 11/2/15

=== Departures ===
After enrolling early and attending spring training quarterback Austin Kafentzis announced that he would transfer from Wisconsin to the University of Nevada before the start of the 2015 season.

At the end of the season redshirt freshman quarterback D.J. Gillins announced that he would transfer as well, to Pearl River Community College. It was reported that Gillins likely transferred because he wouldn't fit in Paul Chryst's Pro-style offense, he was originally recruited by former head coach Gary Andersen as a more mobile dual-threat style quarterback.

=== Depth chart ===
Defense

FS
Tanner McEvoy
Leo Musso
⋅

OLB	ILB	ILB	OLB
Vince Biegel	T. J. Edwards	Jack Cichy	Joe Schobert
Jesse Hayes	Chris Orr	Ryan Connelly	T. J. Watt
⋅	⋅	⋅	⋅

SS
Michael Caputo
D'Cota Dixon
⋅

CB
Darius Hillary
Natrell Jamerson
⋅

DE	NT	DE
Arthur Goldberg	Conor Sheehy	Chikwe Obasih
Jake Keefer	Olive Sagapolu	Alec James
⋅	⋅	⋅

CB
Sojourn Shelton
Derrick Tinda
⋅

Offense

WR
Alex Erickson
Tanner McEvoy
Reggie Love
⋅

LT	LG	C	RG	RT
Tyler Marz	Michael Deiter	Dan Voltz	Walker Williams	Hayden Biegel
Jacob Maxwell	Ray Ball	Micah Kapoi	Micah Kapoi	Walker Williams
⋅	⋅	⋅	⋅	⋅

TE
Troy Fumagalli
Austin Traylor
Eric Steffes

WR
Robert Wheelwright
Jazz Peavy
Jordan Fredrick

QB
Joel Stave
Bart Houston
⋅

Key reserves

RB
Dare Ogunbowale
Taiwan Deal
Alec Ingold

FB
Derek Watt
Austin Ramesh
⋅

Special teams
PK Rafael Gaglianone
P Drew Meyer
KR Natrell Jamerson
PR Alex Erickson
LS Connor Udelhoven

== Statistics ==
=== Team ===
Team statistics
	Wisconsin	Opponents
Scoring & Efficiency
Points	348	178
Total Time Possession	07:20:10	05:39:50
Average Time Per Game	33:52	26:08
First Downs	276	183
Rushing	95	60
Passing	157	107
Penalty	24	16
3rd–Down Conversions	75/184	59/189
4th–Down Conversions	6/8	6/20
Red Zone Scoring	46/54	19/25
Red Zone Touchdowns	35/54	11/25
Penalties – Yards	75-689	99-869
Yards Per Game	53.0	66.9
Offense
Total Offense	4,922	3,491
Total plays	931	791
Average Plays Per Game	71.6	60.8
Average Yards Per Play	5.3	4.4
Average Yards Per Game	378.6	268.5
Rushing Yards	1,954	1,240
Rushing Attempts	512	396
Average Per Rush	3.8	3.1
Average Per Game	150.3	95.4
Rushing TDs	27	13
Passing Yards	2,968	2,251
Comp–Att	252-419	194–395
Comp %	60.1	49.1
Average Per Pass	7.1	5.7
Average Per Catch	11.8	11.6
Average Per Game	228.3	173.2
Passing tds	14	7
Interceptions	13	12
Defense
INT Returns: # – Yards	12-105	13–195
INT Touchdowns	0	2
Fumbles Recovered: # – Yards	9–15	5–10
Fumble recovery Touchdowns	0	0
QB Sacks: # – Yards	29-221	23-154
Touchdowns	0	2
Safeties	0	0
Special teams
Kickoffs: # – Yards	71–4,122	41–2,451
Average Yards Per Kick	58.1	59.8
Touchbacks	13	11
Onside Kicks: # – Recovered	0-0	1–0
Punts: # – Yards	71–2,788	85–3,434
Average Yards Per Punt	39.3	40.4
Kickoff Returns: # – Yards	28-555	55-935
Average Yards Per Return	19.8	17.0
Kickoff return Touchdowns	1	0
Punt Returns: # – Yards	29-211	17-69
Average Yards Per Return	7.3	4.1
Punt return Touchdowns	0	0
Field Goals: # – Attempts	18-27	8–19
Longest Field Goal: Yards	49	44
PAT: # – Attempts	42-42	22-22

Non-conference opponents

	1	2	3	4	Total
Wisconsin	27	58	38	31	154
All opponents	10	14	21	14	59

Big 10 opponents

	1	2	3	4	Total
Wisconsin	41	61	51	41	194
Big 10 opponents	27	54	14	24	119

=== Offense ===
Passing statistics
#	NAME	POS	RAT	CMP	ATT	YDS	AVG	CMP%	TD	INT	LONG
2	Joel Stave	QB	125.7	225	370	2,687	7.3	60.8	11	11	45
13	Bart Houston	QB	120.2	27	47	281	6.0	57.5	3	2	23
--	Team	--	0	0	2	0	0.0	0.0	0	0	0
	TOTALS		124.5	252	419	2,968	7.1	60.1	14	13	45
	OPPONENTS		96.8	194	395	2,251	5.7	49.1	7	12	51

Rushing statistics
#	NAME	POS	CAR	YDS	AVG	LONG	TD
23	Dare Ogunbowale	RB	194	819	4.2	35	7
28	Taiwan Deal	RB	117	503	4.3	17	6
6	Corey Clement	RB	48	221	4.6	58	5
3	Tanner McEvoy	WR-QB	17	132	7.8	32	2
45	Alec Ingold	RB	49	131	2.7	26	6
86	Alex Erickson	WR	7	111	15.9	56	0
58	Joe Schobert	LB	1	57	57.0	57	0
34	Derek Watt	FB	9	45	5.0	19	0
16	Reggie Love	WR	7	38	5.4	18	0
22	Caleb Kinlaw	RB	7	30	4.4	10	0
30	Serge Trezy	RB	6	18	3.0	7	0
87	George Rushing	WR	2	7	3.5	6	0
26	Derek Straus	FB	1	4	4.0	4	0
21	Mark Saari	RB	3	0	0.0	3	0
13	Bart Houston	QB	4	-17	-4.3	1	0
--	Team	--	7	-22	-3.1	0	0
2	Joel Stave	QB	33	-123	-3.7	11	0
	TOTALS		512	2,257	3.8	58	27
	OPPONENTS		396	1,566	3.1	56	13

Receiving statistics
#	NAME	POS	REC	YDS	AVG	LONG	TD
86	Alex Erickson	WR	77	978	12.7	45	3
15	Robert Wheelwright	WR	32	416	13.0	30	4
81	Tony Fumagalli	TE	28	313	11.2	31	1
23	Dare Ogunbowale	RB	36	299	8.3	35	1
11	Jazz Peavy	WR	20	268	13.4	42	0
46	Austin Traylor	TE	14	210	15.0	38	4
34	Derek Watt	FB	15	139	9.3	27	0
3	Tanner McEvoy	WR-QB	10	109	10.9	23	0
9	Jordan Fredrick	WR	7	81	11.6	22	0
16	Reggie Love	WR	4	55	13.8	26	0
44	Eric Steffes	TE	3	50	16.8	19	0
6	Corey Clement	RB	2	19	9.5	13	0
20	Austin Ramesh	FB	1	12	12.0	12	0
87	George Rushing	WR	1	10	10.0	10	0
22	Caleb Kinlaw	RB	1	5	5.0	5	1
28	Taiwan Deal	RB	1	4	4.0	4	0
	TOTALS		252	2,968	11.8	45	14
	OPPONENTS		194	2,251	11.6	51	7

=== Defense ===
Defense statistics
#	NAME	POS	SOLO	AST	TOT	TFL-YDS	SACK-YDS	INT-YDS	PBU	QBH	FF	FR-YDS	TD
53	T. J. Edwards	LB	41	43	84	6.5-11	0.0–0	0–0	4	2	1	0–0	0
58	Joe Schobert	LB	39	40	79	19.5-98	9.5–78	1–14	2	14	5	2–0	0
47	Vince Biegel	LB	31	35	66	14.0-81	8.0–64	0–0	0	9	0	0–0	0
7	Michael Caputo	S	36	29	65	1.0-7	0.5–5	2–4	8	0	2	1–0	0
48	Jack Cichy	LB	32	28	60	8.0-52	5.0–38	0–0	4	2	0	0–0	0
50	Chris Orr	LB	24	22	46	2.0-11	0.5–5	0–0	2	3	0	1–0	0
5	Darius Hillary	CB	28	16	44	1.5-3	0.0–0	0–0	6	0	0	2–0	0
3	Tanner McEvoy	S	27	15	42	2.0-15	1.0–10	6–83	6	0	0	1–15	0
34	Chikwe Obasih	DE	19	22	41	5.0-15	1.0–9	0–0	0	2	0	0–0	0
25	Derrick Tindal	CB	18	14	32	0.5-1	0.0–0	0–0	5	2	0	0–0	0
94	Conor Sheehy	NT	8	23	31	3.0-9	2.0–7	0–0	1	0	0	0–0	0
8	Sojourn Shelton	CB	20	9	29	0.0-0	0.0–0	1–0	7	0	1	0–0	0
57	Alec James	DE	7	10	17	2.0-4	1.0–2	0–0	1	0	0	0–0	0
95	Arthur Goldberg	DE	5	12	17	0.0-0	0.0–0	0–0	0	0	0	0–0	0
14	D'Cota Dixon	LB	11	5	16	0.0-0	0.0–0	0–0	1	2	0	0–0	0
43	Ryan Connelly	LB	8	7	15	1.0-3	0.0–0	0–0	0	0	0	0–0	0
12	Natrell Jamerson	CB	10	4	14	0.5-2	0.0–0	0–0	0	0	0	0–0	0
32	Leon Jacobs	LB	5	5	10	2.0-4	0.5–3	0–0	0	0	0	0–0	0
36	Joe Ferguson	S	2	8	10	0.0-0	0.0–0	0–0	0	0	0	0–0	0
19	Leo Musso	S	5	3	8	0.0-0	0.0–0	2–4	1	1	0	1–0	0
34	Derek Straus	FB	5	3	8	0.0-0	0.0–0	0–0	0	0	0	0–0	0
41	Jesse Hayes	LB	2	6	8	0.0-0	0.0–0	0–0	1	0	0	0–0	0
42	T. J. Watt	LB	4	4	8	1.5-5	0.0–0	0–0	3	4	0	0–0	0
65	Olive Sagapolu	NT	1	6	7	1.0-4	0.0–0	0–0	0	0	0	0–0	0
21	Arrington Farrar	LB	5	1	6	0.0-0	0.0–0	0–0	0	1	0	0–0	0
93	Jake Keefer	DE	3	3	6	0.0-0	0.0–0	0–0	0	0	0	0–0	0
37	Andrew Endicott	K	2	3	5	0.0-0	0.0–0	0–0	0	0	0	0–0	0
55	Garret Dooley	LB	0	3	3	0.0-0	0.0–0	0–0	0	0	0	0–0	0
96	Billy Hirschfeld	DE	2	1	3	1.0-2	0.0–0	0–0	1	0	0	0–0	0
24	Keelon Brookins	LB	2	0	2	1.0-2	0.0–0	0–0	0	0	0	0–0	0
97	Jack Russell	K	1	1	2	0.0-0	0.0–0	0–0	0	0	0	0–0	0
30	Serge Trezy	RB	1	1	2	0.0-0	0.0–0	0–0	0	0	0	0–0	0
2	Joel Stave	QB	1	0	1	0.0-0	0.0–0	0–0	0	0	0	0–0	0
9	Jordan Fredrick	WR	0	1	1	0.0-0	0.0–0	0–0	0	0	0	0–0	0
11	Jazz Peavy	WR	1	0	1	0.0-0	0.0–0	0–0	0	0	0	0–0	0
16	Reggie Love	WR	1	0	1	0.0-0	0.0–0	0–0	0	0	0	0–0	0
23	Dare Ogunbowale	RB	1	0	1	0.0-0	0.0–0	0–0	0	0	0	0–0	0
31	Lubern Figaro	S	1	0	1	0.0-0	0.0–0	0–0	0	0	0	0–0	0
46	Austin Traylor	TE	1	0	1	0.0-0	0.0–0	0–0	0	0	0	0–0	0
52	Kellen Jones	LB	1	0	1	1.0-4	0.0–0	0–0	0	0	0	0–0	0
82	A.J. Jordan	WR	0	1	1	0.0-0	0.0–0	0–0	0	0	0	0–0	0
86	Alex Erickson	WR	1	0	1	0.0-0	0.0–0	0–0	0	0	0	0–0	0
66	Beau Benzschawel	OL	1	0	1	0.0-0	0.0–0	0–0	0	0	0	0–0	0
29	Terrance Floyd	CB	1	0	1	0.0-0	0.0–0	0–0	0	0	0	0–0	0
60	Connor Udelhoven	LS	0	0	0	0.0-0	0.0–0	0–0	0	0	0	1–0	0
91	Zander Neuville	DE	0	0	0	0.0-0	0.0–0	0–0	1	0	0	0–0	0
	TOTAL		414	384	798	74-333	29-221	12–105	54	42	9	9-15	0
	OPPONENTS		472	527	999	73-276	23-154	13-195	55	21	6	5-10	2

Key: POS: Position, SOLO: Solo Tackles, AST: Assisted Tackles, TOT: Total Tackles, TFL: Tackles-for-loss, SACK: Quarterback Sacks, INT: Interceptions, PBU: Passes Broken Up, QBH: Quarterback Hits, FF: Forced Fumbles, FR: Fumbles Recovered, TD : Touchdown

=== Special teams ===
Kicking statistics
#	NAME	POS	XPM	XPA	XP%	FGM	FGA	FG%	1–19	20–29	30–39	40–49	50+	LNG	PTS
10	Rafael Gaglianone	PK	40	40	100.0	18	27	66.7	0/0	8/8	2/5	8/11	0/3	49	94
97	Jack Russell	PK	2	2	100.0	0	0	0	0/0	0/0	0/0	0/0	0/0	0	2
	TOTALS		42	42	100.0	18	27	66.7	0/0	8/8	2/5	8/11	0/3	49	96
	OPPONENTS		22	22	100.0	8	19	42.1	3/3	1/4	4/10	0/2	1/3	44	45

Kickoff statistics
#	NAME	POS	KICKS	YDS	AVG	TB	OB
37	Andrew Endicott	PK	36	2,169	60.3	9	2
97	Jack Russell	PK	27	1,453	53.8	3	1
38	P.J. Rosowski	P	8	500	62.5	1	0
	TOTALS		71	4,122	58.1	13	3
	OPPONENTS		41	2,451	59.8	11	2

Punting statistics
#	NAME	POS	PUNTS	YDS	AVG	LONG	TB	I–20	50+	BLK
90	Drew Meyer	P	69	2,737	39.7	60	10	27	14	0
38	P.J. Rosowski	P	1	40	40.0	0	0	0	0	0
--	Team	--	1	11	11.0	0	0	0	0	0
	TOTALS		71	2,788	39.3	60	10	27	14	0
	OPPONENTS		85	3,434	40.4	61	3	22	12	0

Kick return statistics
#	NAME	POS	RTNS	YDS	AVG	TD	LNG
12	Natrell Jamerson	CB	20	448	22.4	1	98
86	Alex Erickson	WR	2	37	18.5	0	19
26	Derek Straus	FB	3	35	11.8	0	14
45	Alec Ingold	RB	2	32	16.0	0	22
91	Zander Neuville	DE	1	3	3.0	0	3
	TOTALS		28	555	19.8	1	98
	OPPONENTS		55	935	17.0	0	42

Punt return statistics
#	NAME	POS	RTNS	YDS	AVG	TD	LONG
86	Alex Erickson	WR	24	176	7.3	0	35
8	Sojourn Shelton	CB	3	26	8.7	0	17
11	Jazz Peavy	WR	2	9	4.5	0	9
	TOTALS		29	211	7.3	0	35
	OPPONENTS		17	69	4.1	0	18

== Big Ten Players of the Week ==
- Week 4 - Freshman of the Week - RB, Taiwan Deal
- Week 5 - Co-defensive Player of the Week - LB, Joe Schobert
- Week 7 - Freshman of the Week - LB, T. J. Edwards
- Week 8 - Special Teams Player of the Week - P, Drew Meyer
- Week 13 - Special Teams Player of the Week - P, Drew Meyer

== Awards ==
- Vince Biegel

Third team All-Big Ten (Media)
Third team All-Big Ten (Coaches)

- Michael Caputo

Second team All-Big Ten (Media)
Second team All-Big Ten (Coaches)

- Joe Schobert

Jack Lambert Trophy
Butkus-Fitzgerald Linebacker of the Year
First team All-Big Ten (Coaches)
First team All-Big Ten (Media)

- Derek Watt

Big Ten Sportsmanship Award

== 2016 NFL draft ==
=== 2016 NFL Draft class ===
2016 NFL draft selections
Round	Pick #	Team	Player	Position
4	99	Cleveland Browns	Joe Schobert	Outside linebacker
6	198	San Diego Chargers	Derek Watt	Fullback

=== Signed undrafted free agents ===
- Michael Caputo, S, New Orleans Saints
- Alex Erickson, WR, Cincinnati Bengals
- Darius Hillary, CB, Cincinnati Bengals
- Tyler Marz, OT, Tennessee Titans
- Tanner McEvoy, QB/S/WR, Seattle Seahawks
- Joel Stave, QB, Minnesota Vikings
- Austin Traylor, TE, Dallas Cowboys
