= 2014 All-Big Ten Conference football team =

American college football all-star team

The 2014 All-Big Ten Conference football team consists of American football players chosen as All-Big Ten Conference players for the 2014 Big Ten Conference football season. The conference recognizes two official All-Big Ten selectors: (1) the Big Ten conference coaches selected separate offensive and defensive units and named first- and second-team players (the "Coaches" team); and (2) a panel of sports writers and broadcasters covering the Big Ten also selected offensive and defensive units and named first- and second-team players (the "Media" team).

Michigan State led all other teams with five first-team selections, including wide receiver Tony Lippett and defensive back Shilique Calhoun. Conference and national champion Ohio State followed with four first-team selections, including quarterback J. T. Barrett and Joey Bosa.

There were only two unanimous selections, both of whom were All-Americans, consensus All-American defensive lineman Joey Bosa and unanimous All-American running back Melvin Gordon.

== Offensive selections ==
=== Quarterbacks ===
- J. T. Barrett, Ohio State (Coaches-1; Media-1)
- Connor Cook, Michigan State (Coaches-2; Media-2)

=== Running backs ===
- Tevin Coleman, Indiana (Coaches-1; Media-1)
- Melvin Gordon, Wisconsin (Coaches-1; Media-1)
- Ameer Abdullah, Nebraska (Coaches-2; Media-2)
- David Cobb, Minnesota (Coaches-2; Media-2)

=== Wide receivers ===
- Tony Lippett, Michigan State (Coaches-1; Media-1)
- Kenny Bell, Nebraska (Coaches-1)
- Leonte Carroo, Rutgers (Media-1)
- Stefon Diggs, Maryland (Coaches-2)
- Devin Funchess, Michigan (Coaches-2)
- Mike Dudek, Illinois (Media-2)
- DaeSean Hamilton, Penn State (Media-2)

=== Centers ===
- Jack Allen, Michigan State (Coaches-1; Media-1)
- Austin Blythe, Iowa (Coaches-2)
- Dan Voltz, Wisconsin (Media-2)

=== Guards ===
- Kyle Costigan, Wisconsin (Coaches-1; Media-1)
- Pat Elflein, Ohio State (Coaches-1; Media-2)
- Zac Epping, Minnesota (Coaches-2; Media-1)
- Travis Jackson, Michigan State (Coaches-2; Media-2)

=== Tackles ===
- Brandon Scherff, Iowa (Coaches-1; Media-1)
- Rob Havenstein, Wisconsin (Coaches-1; Media-1)
- Jack Conklin, Michigan State (Coaches-2; Media-2)
- Taylor Decker, Ohio State (Coaches-2; Media-2)

=== Tight ends ===
- Maxx Williams, Minnesota (Coaches-1; Media-1)
- Jeff Heuerman, Ohio State (Coaches-2; Media-2)

== Defensive selections ==
=== Defensive linemen ===
- Joey Bosa, Ohio State (Coaches-1; Media-1)
- Shilique Calhoun, Michigan State (Coaches-1; Media-1)
- Randy Gregory, Nebraska (Coaches-1; Media-1)
- Anthony Zettel, Penn State (Coaches-1; Media-1)
- Carl Davis, Iowa (Coaches-2; Media-2)
- Michael Bennett, Ohio State (Coaches-2; Media-2)
- Louis Trinca-Pasat, Iowa (Coaches-2)
- Maliek Collins, Nebraska (Coaches-2)
- Drew Ott, Iowa (Media-2)
- Andre Monroe, Maryland (Media-2)

=== Linebackers ===
- Jake Ryan, Michigan (Coaches-1; Media-1)
- Mike Hull, Penn State (Coaches-1; Media-1)
- Derek Landisch, Wisconsin (Coaches-1; Media-2)
- Damien Wilson, Minnesota (Coaches-2; Media-1)
- Quinton Alston, Iowa (Coaches-2)
- Taiwan Jones, Michigan State (Coaches-2)
- Joshua Perry, Ohio State (Media-2)
- Vince Biegel, Wisconsin (Media-2)

=== Defensive backs ===
- William Likely, Maryland (Coaches-1; Media-1)
- Kurtis Drummond, Michigan State (Coaches-1; Media-1)
- Trae Waynes, Michigan State (Coaches-1; Media-1)
- Doran Grant, Ohio State (Coaches-1; Media-2)
- Briean Boddy-Calhoun, Minnesota (Coaches-2; Media-1)
- Michael Caputo, Wisconsin (Coaches-2; Media-2)
- Ibraheim Campbell, Northwestern (Coaches-2)
- Eric Murray, Minnesota (Coaches-2)
- Frankie Williams, Purdue (Coaches-2)
- Darius Hillary, Wisconsin (Coaches-2)
- Nate Gerry, Nebraska (Media-2)
- Nick Van Hoose, Northwestern (Media-2)

== Special teams ==
=== Kickers ===
- Brad Craddock, Maryland (Coaches-1; Media-1)
- Sam Ficken, Penn State (Coaches-2; Media-2)

=== Punters ===
- Peter Mortell, Minnesota (Coaches-1; Media-1)
- Justin DuVernois, Illinois (Coaches-2; Media-2)

== Key ==
CAPS = Unanimous first-team selection by both the coaches and media

Bold = Consensus first-team selection by both the coaches and media

Coaches = Selected by the Big Ten Conference coaches

Media = Selected by the conference media

== See also ==
- 2014 College Football All-America Team
