= Michael Caputo (American football) =

American football player and coach (born 1992)

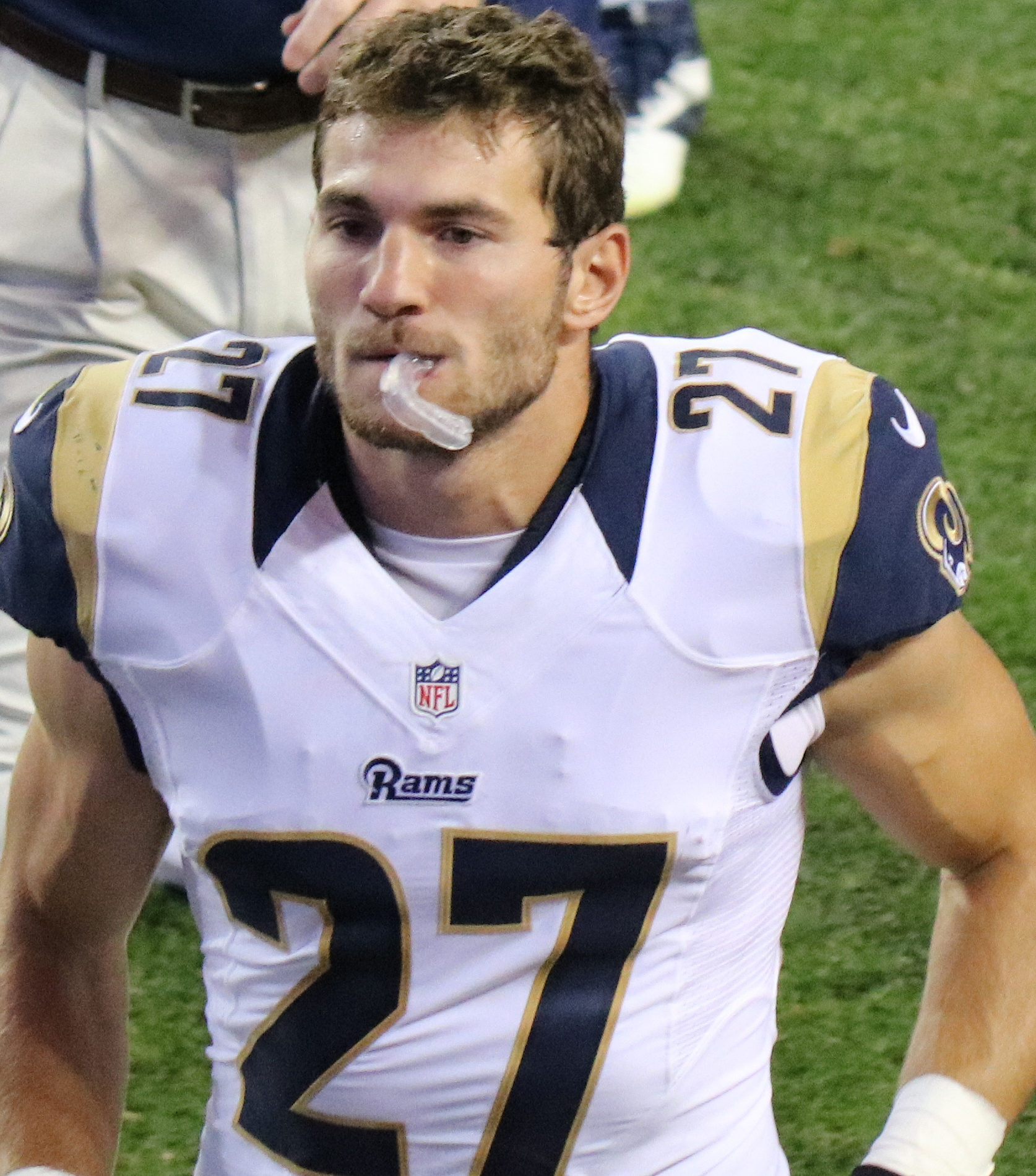
- Caputo with the Los Angeles Rams in 2016

Buffalo Bulls
- Title: Quality control coach

Personal information
- Born: October 26, 1992 (age 34); Imperial, Pennsylvania, U.S.
- Listed height: 6 ft 1 in (1.85 m)
- Listed weight: 206 lb (93 kg)

Career information
- High school: West Allegheny
- College: Wisconsin
- NFL draft: 2016: undrafted

Career history

Playing
- New Orleans Saints (2016)*; Los Angeles Rams (2016)*
- * Offseason or practice squad member only

Coaching
- LSU (2017–2018) Graduate assistant; Utah State (2019) Safeties coach; Baylor (2020–2021) Quality Control Coach; Wisconsin (2022) Defensive Assistant; Buffalo (2023) Safeties/Special Teams

Awards and highlights
- Second-team All-American (2014); 2× Second-team All-Big Ten (2014, 2015); Defensive MVP East–West Shrine Game (2015)

Michael Caputo (born October 26, 1992) is an American college football coach and former player. He played college football for the Wisconsin Badgers. He is currently working as the safeties and special teams coach for the Buffalo Bulls.

== Early life ==
College recruiting
Name	Hometown	School	Height	Weight	40^{‡}	Commit date
Michael Caputo; S/OLB	Imperial, PA	West Allegheny	6 ft 1 in (1.85 m)	190 lb (86 kg)	–	Aug 10, 2010
Michael Caputo; S/OLB	Recruit ratings: Scout: Rivals: 247Sports: ESPN: (77)					
Overall recruit ranking:
‡ Refers to 40-yard dash; Note: In many cases, Scout, Rivals, 247Sports, On3, and ESPN may conflict in their listings of height, weight and 40 time.; In these cases, the average was taken. ESPN grades are on a 100-point scale.; Sources: "Wisconsin Football Commitment List 2014". Rivals.; "Wisconsin Football Recruiting Commits 2014". Scout.; "Wisconsin Badgers Commits 2014". ESPN.; "Scout.com Team Recruiting Rankings". Scout.; "2011 Team Ranking". Rivals.com.; "247sports.com 2011 Wisconsin Football Commits". 247Sports.

== College career ==
=== 2011–2014 ===
Caputo attended the University of Wisconsin–Madison where he played safety for the Wisconsin Badgers football team from 2011 through 2015. He was a starter for three seasons, 2013–2015.

Caputo's freshman year he was a member of the scout team and received a redshirt. In 2012, he played in 13 games, and only recorded ten tackles.

For the 2013 season Caputo earned a starting spot at safety despite missing all of spring training after undergoing neck surgery. Caputo started 12 of 13 games. By the end of the season Caputo tallied 63 tackles which ranked 2nd on the entire team.

In the 2014 season Caputo led the team in tackles with 106 tackles and was a consensus 2nd team All-Big Ten pick as well being named 2nd team All-American by the Football Writers Association of America.

=== 2015 ===
In the off season Caputo was named team captain for the 2015 season. Prior to the season starting Caputo was named to numerous preseason award watchlists, including the Lott IMPACT Trophy, Bednarik Award, Bronko Nagurski Trophy and Jim Thorpe Award.

In the season opener against Alabama, on the third play of the game, Caputo went down hard while tackling runningback Derrick Henry. After the play Caputo tried to join the Alabama huddle, shortly thereafter the referees called timeout and Caputo was later diagnosed with a concussion.

Caputo played in the 2016 East–West Shrine Game which was played at Tropicana Field in St. Petersburg, Florida. He recorded three tackles, two passes defensed and two interceptions. One of the interceptions was on former teammate Joel Stave which Caputo returned for 66 yards and was eventually tackled by Stave on the 11-yard line, preventing a pick six. After the game, Caputo was named the defensive MVP.

=== College statistics ===
Year	Team	GP	Solo	Ast	Total	TFL	Sack	INT	PD	FF	FR
2011	Wisconsin	redshirt season									
2012	Wisconsin	13	8	2	10	0.0	0.0	0	0	0	0
2013	Wisconsin	12	36	27	63	3.0	0.0	0	3	0	0
2014	Wisconsin	14	64	42	106	6.0	1.0	1	6	4	2
2015	Wisconsin	13	36	29	65	1.0	0.5	2	8	1	2
College Totals		52	144	100	244	10.0	1.5	3	17	5	4

== Professional career ==
Pre-draft measurables
Height	Weight	Arm length	Hand span	40-yard dash	10-yard split	20-yard split	20-yard shuttle	Three-cone drill	Vertical jump	Broad jump
6 ft 0 1/2 in (1.84 m)	207 lb (94 kg)	31 in (0.79 m)	9 1/2 in (0.24 m)	4.62 s	1.64 s	2.69 s	4.14 s	6.86 s	35.5 in (0.90 m)	9 ft 9 in (2.97 m)
All values from Wisconsin's Pro Day

Caputo trained at Fischer Sports Institute in Phoenix, Arizona for the NFL Combine in February and Wisconsin's Pro Day in March, ultimately in preparation for the 2016 NFL draft. Caputo did not receive an invite to the NFL Combine and worked out at Wisconsin's Pro Day on March 9, 2016.

=== New Orleans Saints ===
After going unselected in the 2016 NFL draft, Caputo signed with the New Orleans Saints as an undrafted free agent on May 1, 2016. He was released by New Orleans on May 16.

=== Los Angeles Rams ===
Caputo was signed by the Los Angeles Rams on August 15, 2016. On August 30, Caputo was released by the Rams.
