= Vince Biegel =

American football player (born 1993)

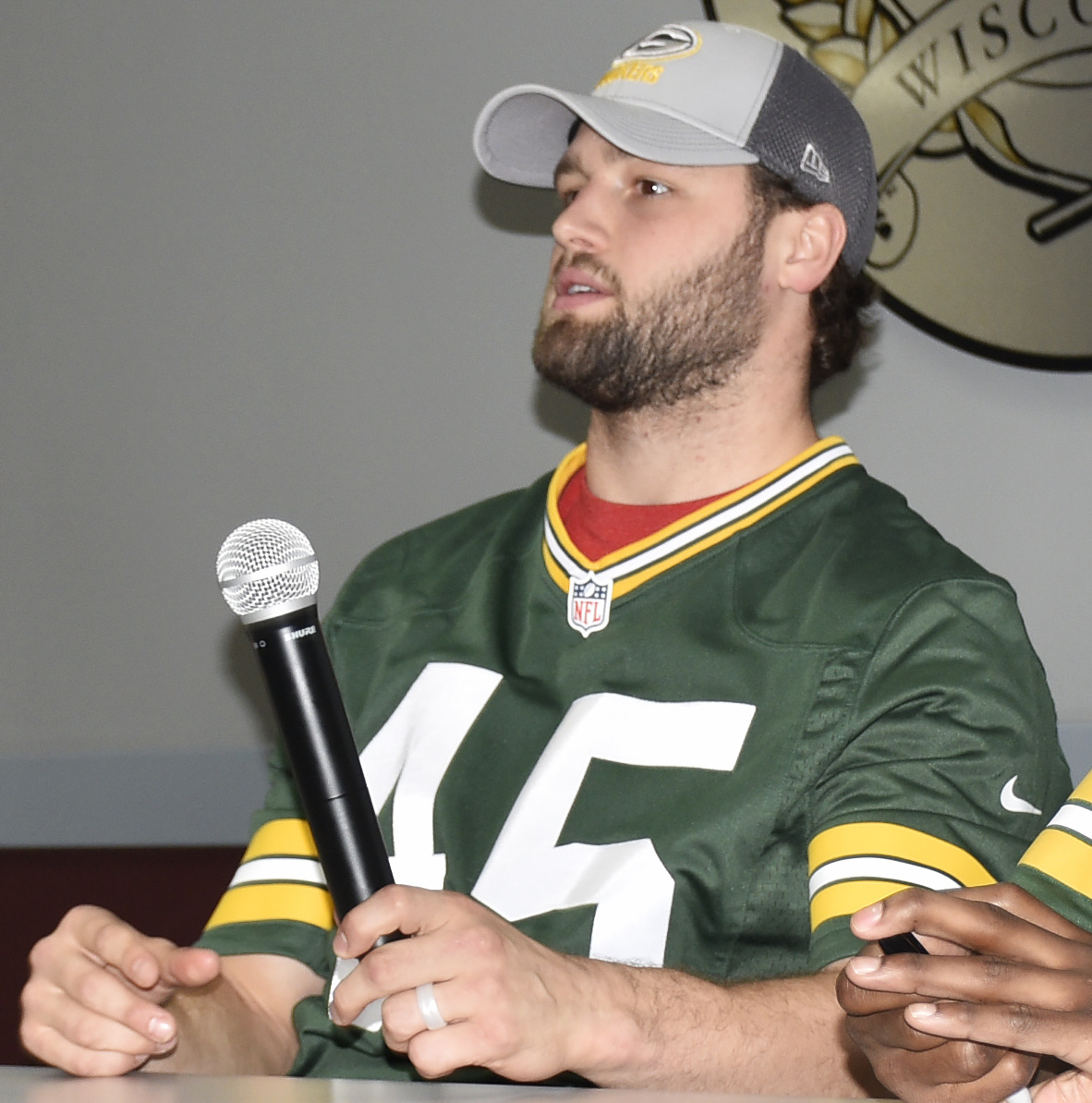
- Biegel with the Green Bay Packers in 2017

No. 45, 59, 47
- Position: Linebacker

Personal information
- Born: July 2, 1993 (age 33); Marshfield, Wisconsin, U.S.
- Listed height: 6 ft 3 in (1.91 m)
- Listed weight: 246 lb (112 kg)

Career information
- High school: Lincoln (Wisconsin Rapids, Wisconsin)
- College: Wisconsin (2012-2016)
- NFL draft: 2017: 4th round, 108th overall pick

Career history
- Green Bay Packers (2017); New Orleans Saints (2018); Miami Dolphins (2019–2021); Baltimore Ravens (2022)

Awards and highlights
- 2× Second-team All-Big Ten (2014, 2016); Third-team All-Big Ten (2015)

Career NFL statistics
- Total tackles: 81
- Sacks: 2.5
- Interceptions: 1
- Stats at Pro Football Reference

Vincent James Biegel (/ˈbiːɡəl/ BEE-gul; born July 2, 1993) is an American former professional football player who was a linebacker in the National Football League (NFL). He played college football for the Wisconsin Badgers.

== Early life ==
Biegel's father, Rocky, was a linebacker for BYU from 1988–92 and a second-team All-Western Athletic Conference player in 1990. His uncle, T.D., played fullback alongside his father for BYU from 1989–93. His grandfather, Ken Biegel, played linebacker and offensive guard for the division III UW–Eau Claire Blugolds. His younger brother, Hayden Biegel, played offensive tackle at UW-Madison.

Named after the legendary Packers' coach Vince Lombardi, Vince grew up on a cranberry marsh near Wisconsin Rapids, Wisconsin, that was originally established by his mother's ancestors in 1919; he, his brother, and his sister are the fifth generation of the family to have worked the farm. He regularly worked on the marsh while growing up, although his football development eventually limited his farm work.

Biegel's senior year he recorded 172 tackles, 21 sacks, three interceptions, five forced fumbles, three fumble recoveries and two defensive touchdowns. He was named the Wisconsin Football Coaches Association Defensive Player of the Year, 2011 Gatorade State Player of the Year in Wisconsin as well as being a member of the 2011 USA Today All-USA high school football team.

Regarded as a four-star recruit by four major recruiting services; Rivals.com, Scout.com, ESPN.com and 247Sports.com. Biegel committed to Wisconsin his junior year of high school, on April 23, 2011. He chose Wisconsin over scholarship offers from BYU, Iowa, Michigan, Michigan State, Stanford, Tennessee, among others. Biegel's final decision came down to Wisconsin and BYU; in a 2016 interview for ESPN, he elaborated on his choice of Wisconsin:

I felt that Wisconsin was the place where I needed to be. I knew if I went to BYU, I would be kind of another Mormon kid on campus. But if I went to Wisconsin, I could really be someone that could make a difference and show the person who I am and have the biggest impact.

He was one of 90 players across the nation selected to play in the 2012 U.S. Army All-American Bowl which was held on January 7, 2012, at the Alamodome in San Antonio, Texas.

College recruiting
Name	Hometown	School	Height	Weight	40^{‡}	Commit date
Vince Biegel; LB	Wisconsin Rapids, WI	Lincoln HS	6 ft 3 in (1.91 m)	210 lb (95 kg)	4.6	Apr 23, 2011
Vince Biegel; LB	Recruit ratings: Scout: Rivals: 247Sports: ESPN: (80)					
Overall recruit ranking: Scout: #23 OLB Rivals: #3 OLB 247Sports: #16 OLB ESPN: #15 OLB
‡ Refers to 40-yard dash; Note: In many cases, Scout, Rivals, 247Sports, On3, and ESPN may conflict in their listings of height, weight and 40 time.; In these cases, the average was taken. ESPN grades are on a 100-point scale.; Sources: "Wisconsin Football Commitment List 2012". Rivals.; "Wisconsin Football Recruiting Commits 2012". Scout.; "Wisconsin Badgers Commits 2012". ESPN.; "Scout.com Team Recruiting Rankings". Scout.; "2012 Team Ranking". Rivals.com.; "247sports.com 2011 Wisconsin Football Commits". 247Sports.

== College career ==
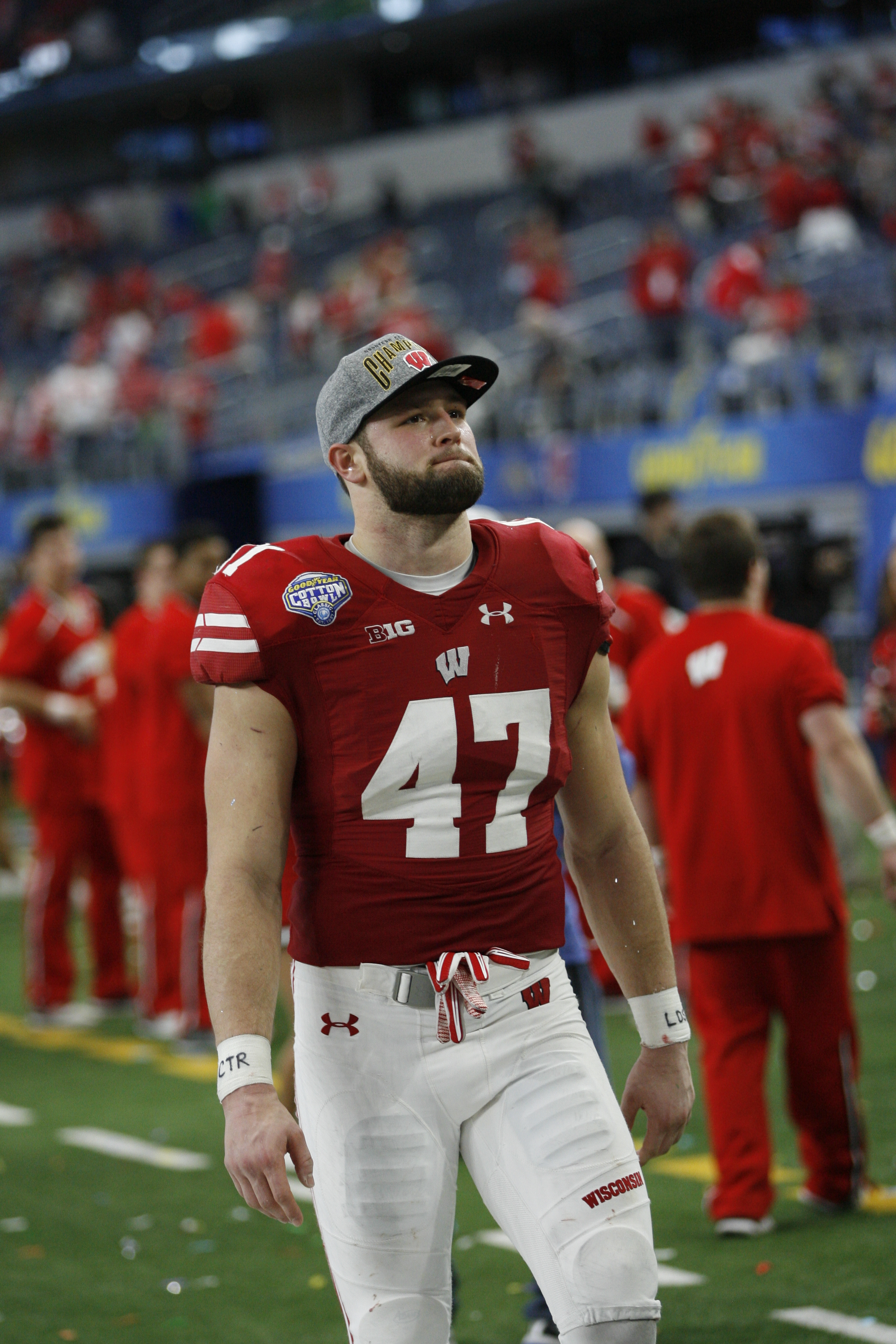
Biegel with the Wisconsin Badgers in 2017

Biegel attended the University of Wisconsin-Madison where he played outside linebacker for the Wisconsin Badgers football team from 2012 through 2016.

=== 2012 ===
Biegel played in two games his freshman year and didn't record any statistics, he injured his foot and received a medical redshirt.

=== 2013 ===
Biegel played in 13 games and started two of them in 2013. He recorded 25 total tackles, three tackles-for-loss and two sacks.

=== 2014 ===
The 2014 season saw the Badgers replace all 4 starting linebackers from 2013. Joe Schobert and Biegel replaced the starting outside linebackers while Derek Landisch and Marcus Trotter replaced the starting inside linebackers. Schobert and Biegel were described by Trotter as exact opposites, he described Biegel as "a hamster on a wheel, man. He's just always running." while he said "Schobert is the exact opposite. He's very calm all the time." Biegel started 13 of 14 games in 2014.

Biegel had a breakout game against Purdue in 2014 when he recorded seven tackles, three sacks, four tackles-for-loss and one pass defensed. He was named Big Ten Conference Defensive Player of the Week for his performance.

For the season, Biegel recorded 56 total tackles, 16.5 tackles-for-loss and 7.5 sacks. He was named 2nd-team All-Big Ten by the media.

=== 2015 ===
2015 saw the Badgers replace the starting inside linebackers again while Schobert and Biegel started opposite one another again. Biegel was named to numerous preseason award watchlists, notably Bednarik Award, Bronko Nagurski Trophy and the Lombardi Award. Biegel started all 13 games in 2015.

Following the end of the regular seasons Biegel was named third-team All-Big Ten by coaches and media. During an interview Biegel was asked what he thought of Schobert's comment on Biegel deserving more recognition, Biegel said "being named third-team all-Big Ten is a flat-out slap in the face to me."

Following the Badgers win over USC in the Holiday Bowl Biegel announced he would return for the 2016 season instead of declaring for the 2016 NFL draft. Biegel had requested an evaluation by the NFL Draft Advisory Board and they projected him to be drafted between the 3rd and 6th rounds should he enter the 2016 draft.

For the season Biegel recorded 66 total tackles, 14 tackles-for-loss and 8 sacks. He was third on the team in tackles behind fellow linebackers T. J. Edwards (84) and Joe Schobert (79), second behind Schobert in both tackles-for-loss (19.5) and sacks (9.5).

=== 2016 ===
Prior to the start of the season Biegel was named to the preseason watchlist for the Bednarik Award. Biegel was named by Pro Football Focus as the number one rated returning outside linebacker in both pass rushing and defending the run. On November 29, 2016, Biegel was named Second-team All-Big Ten.

=== College statistics ===
Year	Team	GP	Solo	Ast	Total	TFL	TFLyds	Sack	INT	PD	FF	FR
2012	Wisconsin	2	0	0	0	0.0	0	0.0	0	0	0	0
2013	Wisconsin	13	19	6	25	3.0	14	2.0	0	2	0	0
2014	Wisconsin	14	38	18	56	16.5	67	7.5	0	2	2	2
2015	Wisconsin	13	31	35	66	14.0	81	8.0	0	0	0	0
2016	Wisconsin	12	29	15	44	6.0	16	3.0	0	1	1	0
College totals		54	117	74	191	39.5	175	20.5	0	5	3	2

== Professional career ==
Pre-draft measurables
Height	Weight	Arm length	Hand span	40-yard dash	10-yard split	20-yard split	20-yard shuttle	Three-cone drill	Vertical jump	Broad jump	Bench press	Wonderlic
6 ft 3 1/4 in (1.91 m)	246 lb (112 kg)	32 3/8 in (0.82 m)	9 1/8 in (0.23 m)	4.67 s	1.64 s	2.73 s	4.30 s	6.92 s	33.5 in (0.85 m)	9 ft 10 in (3.00 m)	21 reps	23
All values from NFL Combine

=== Green Bay Packers ===
Biegel was selected by the Green Bay Packers in the fourth round, 108th overall, in the 2017 NFL draft. On May 15, 2017, Biegel suffered a fracture in the fifth metatarsal in his foot. He signed his rookie contract on May 31, 2017. On September 2, 2017, Biegel was placed on the physically unable to perform (PUP) list. He was activated off PUP to the active roster on November 3, 2017.

On September 1, 2018, Biegel was waived by the Packers.

=== New Orleans Saints ===
On September 2, 2018, Biegel was signed to the practice squad of the New Orleans Saints. He was promoted to the active roster on September 21, 2018.

=== Miami Dolphins ===
On September 1, 2019, Biegel was traded to the Miami Dolphins in exchange for linebacker Kiko Alonso in a salary swap. In week 15 against the New York Giants, Biegel recorded his first career interception off a pass thrown by Eli Manning during the 36–20 loss.

Biegel signed his tender for a one-year contract with the Dolphins on April 6, 2020. On August 18, 2020, Biegel suffered a torn Achilles and was ruled out for the 2020 season. He was placed on injured reserve the next day.

Biegel signed a contract extension with the Dolphins on March 16, 2021. He was placed on injured reserve on August 28, 2021. He was released on September 7. He was re-signed to the practice squad on October 19. He was promoted to the active roster on November 24, 2021.

=== Baltimore Ravens ===
On May 16, 2022, Biegel signed with the Baltimore Ravens. On August 4, after a reportedly strong training camp effort that saw Biegel expected to make Baltimore’s final roster, coach John Harbaugh announced Biegel had suffered a season-ending Achilles injury while practicing. He was placed on injured reserve on August 8, 2022.

== NFL career statistics ==
Regular season statistics
Year	Team	GP	GS	Tackles					Interceptions						Fumbles	
Year	Team	GP	GS	Total	Solo	Ast	Sck	SFTY	PDef	Int	Yds	Avg	Lng	TDs	FF	FR
2017	GB	9	0	15	10	5	0.0	0	0	0	0	0	0	0	0	0
2018	NO	14	0	4	3	1	0.0	0	0	0	0	0	0	0	0	0
2019	MIA	15	10	57	25	32	2.5	0	1	1	7	7	7	0	0	0
2020	MIA	0	0	DNP												
2021	MIA	5	0	2	1	1	0.0	0	0	0	0	0	0	0	0	0
Total		43	10	78	39	39	2.5	0	0	1	7	7	7	0	0	0
Source: NFL.com

== Awards and honors ==
College

- Third-team All-Big Ten (2015)
- 2× Second-team All-Big Ten (media) (2014, 2016)
- Big Ten Defensive Player of the Week (2014)
- Academic All-Big Ten (2013, 2014)
- William V. Campbell Trophy Semifinalist (2016)

High School

- USA Today High School All-American (2011)
- Wisconsin's Gatorade Player of the Year (2011)
- WFCA Defensive Player of the Year (2011)
