= Quinton Alston =

American football player (born 1993)

Profile
- Position: Linebacker

Personal information
- Born: September 7, 1993 (age 33); Sicklerville, New Jersey, U.S.
- Listed height: 6 ft 1 in (1.85 m)
- Listed weight: 232 lb (105 kg)

Career information
- College: Iowa
- NFL draft: 2015: undrafted

Career history
- Tampa Bay Buccaneers (2015)*
- * Offseason or practice squad member only

Awards and highlights
- Second-team All-Big Ten (2014)
- Stats at Pro Football Reference

Quinton Alston (born September 7, 1993) is an American former professional football player who was a linebacker in the National Football League (NFL). He played college football at Iowa and was signed by the Tampa Bay Buccaneers of the NFL.

== Tampa Bay Buccaneers ==
Alston was signed as an undrafted rookie on May 5, 2015. He was cut from the Buccaneers on August 25, 2015.
