= Tanner McEvoy =

American football player (born 1993)

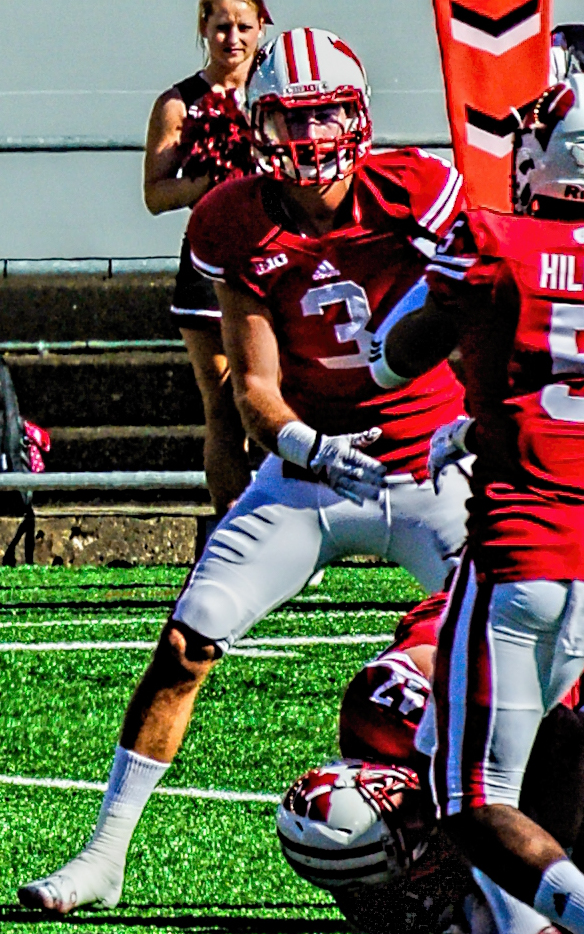
- McEvoy with Wisconsin in 2015

No. 16, 19
- Position: Wide receiver

Personal information
- Born: January 26, 1993 (age 33); Hillsdale, New Jersey, U.S.
- Listed height: 6 ft 6 in (1.98 m)
- Listed weight: 230 lb (104 kg)

Career information
- High school: Bergen Catholic (Oradell, New Jersey)
- College: South Carolina (2011); Arizona Western (2012); Wisconsin (2013–2015)
- NFL draft: 2016: undrafted

Career history
- Seattle Seahawks (2016–2017); New Orleans Saints (2018)*; Miami Dolphins (2018); New Orleans Saints (2018)*; Buffalo Bills (2018)*; Tennessee Titans (2019)*; Tampa Bay Vipers (2020)
- * Offseason or practice squad member only

Career NFL statistics
- Receptions: 14
- Receiving yards: 253
- Receiving touchdowns: 2
- Stats at Pro Football Reference

Tanner McEvoy (born January 26, 1993) is an American former professional football player who was a wide receiver in the National Football League (NFL). He played college football as a quarterback and safety for the Wisconsin Badgers, Arizona Western College, and the South Carolina Gamecocks.

== Early life ==
Born to Tina and Steve McEvoy, McEvoy grew up in Hillsdale, New Jersey. He attended Bergen Catholic High School in Oradell, New Jersey, where he played football and basketball. McEvoy graduated from Bergen Catholic in 2011.

== College career ==
McEvoy verbally committed to the South Carolina Gamecocks on January 20, 2011, to play quarterback. McEvoy redshirted his first year on campus. On July 30, 2012, McEvoy was arrested in North Carolina and charged with speeding and driving after consuming alcohol while under age 21. On August 7, eight days after his arrest, McEvoy announced that he was going to transfer from South Carolina.

McEvoy transferred to Arizona Western prior to the start of the 2012 season. He appeared in 10 games during the 2012 season as a quarterback, passing for 2,301 yards with 29 touchdowns and rushing for six more.

McEvoy transferred to the University of Wisconsin where he played from the 2013 season through the 2015 season. McEvoy played in 38 games, splitting time between playing at safety, quarterback and wide receiver.

== Professional career ==
On January 13, 2016, McEvoy participated in the College Gridiron Showcase in Bedford, Texas. Unfortunately, McEvoy did not receive an invitation to the NFL Combine, most likely due to his time playing multiple positions at Wisconsin and not being a top prospect at a single position. On March 9, 2016, he attended Wisconsin's pro day, where he performed positional drills and combine drills, but chose not to run the 40-yard dash due to tendinitis in his knee. At the conclusion of the pre-draft process, McEvoy was projected to go undrafted and be signed as a free agent. He was ranked the 20th best wide receiver prospect by NFLDraftScout.com.

Pre-draft measurables
Height	Weight	Arm length	Hand span	20-yard shuttle	Three-cone drill	Vertical jump	Broad jump	Bench press
6 ft 5 7/8 in (1.98 m)	230 lb (104 kg)	31 in (0.79 m)	10 3/8 in (0.26 m)	4.29 s	7.00 s	33.5 in (0.85 m)	9 ft 9 in (2.97 m)	17 reps
All values from Wisconsin's Pro Day

=== Seattle Seahawks ===
On May 1, 2016, the Seattle Seahawks signed McEvoy as an undrafted free agent after he went unselected in the 2016 NFL draft. The Seahawks signed him to a three-year, $1.62 million contract.

==== 2016 season: Rookie year ====
Throughout rookie minicamp, organized team activities, and spring training, McEvoy was used at the safety position. Upon arriving at training camp, he was moved to wide receiver and competed for a roster spot against Kenny Lawler, Antwan Goodley, Deshon Foxx, Kasen Williams, Tyler Slavin, Kevin Smith, and Douglas McNeil. Head coach Pete Carroll tried him out at tight end after Jimmy Graham and Nick Vannett suffered injuries and Cooper Helfet was waived.

In his first preseason game against the Kansas City Chiefs, McEvoy caught a 37-yard touchdown pass from Trevone Boykin as time expired, along with two other receptions to total 77-yards. The Seahawks went on to win 17–16 after scoring on the subsequent two-point conversion. Despite missing some time in training camp with a groin injury, McEvoy avoided the Seahawks' practice squad and won the fifth wide receiver position, beating out Kenny Lawler. Head coach Pete Carroll made him the fifth wide receiver on the Seahawks' depth chart behind veterans Doug Baldwin, Tyler Lockett, Jermaine Kearse and Paul Richardson.

McEvoy made his NFL debut in the Seahawks' season-opening 12-10 victory over the Miami Dolphins. On October 2, 2016, McEvoy made his first NFL reception for a 42-yard touchdown during the Seahawks' 27–17 victory at the New York Jets. He made the catch on a pass from Russell Wilson after Jets' safety Calvin Pryor blew his zone coverage and fell down, allowing McEvoy to become wide open for a 42-yard touchdown. During a Week 7 matchup at the Arizona Cardinals, McEvoy blocked a punt attempt by Cardinals' punter Ryan Quigley in the fourth quarter that was recovered by Seahawks' defensive end Cassius Marsh. The blocked punt and recovery helped send the game into overtime with a 3–3 tie, but resulted in a 6–6 tie at the end of the game. The following week, McEvoy received a lateral from Russell Wilson and threw his first career pass attempt for a 43-yard completion to running back C. J. Prosise in the second quarter of the Seahawks' 25–20 loss at the New Orleans Saints. On December 11, 2016, he had a season-high three receptions for 41 receiving yards and scored a 22-yard touchdown reception in the fourth quarter of a 38–10 loss at the Green Bay Packers. He finished his rookie season with a total of nine receptions for 140 receiving yards and two touchdowns in 14 games and zero starts. McEvoy was a healthy scratch for Weeks 2 and 10.

==== 2017 season ====
McEvoy returned to training camp in 2017 and competed with Kenny Lawler, Amara Darboh, Marcus Lucas, David Moore, Kasen Williams, Rodney Smith, Darreus Rogers, and Cyril Grayson. He became the Seahawks' fourth wide receiver, behind Doug Baldwin, Paul Richardson, and Tyler Lockett, after the Seahawks traded Jermaine Kearse to the New York Jets.

On October 29, 2017, McEvoy made a 53-yard reception during Seattle's 41–38 victory over the Houston Texans. During a Week 12 contest at the San Francisco 49ers, he had a season-high two catches for 32 receiving yards in a 24–13 victory. Overall, in the 2017 season, he finished with five receptions for 113 yards.

On August 26, 2018, McEvoy was waived by the Seahawks.

=== New Orleans Saints ===
On August 29, 2018, McEvoy was signed by the New Orleans Saints. He was waived on September 1, 2018.

=== Miami Dolphins ===
On September 2, 2018, McEvoy was claimed off waivers by the Miami Dolphins. He was waived on September 25, 2018.

=== New Orleans Saints (second stint) ===
On October 2, 2018, McEvoy was signed to the New Orleans Saints' practice squad. He was released on October 17, 2018.

=== Buffalo Bills ===
On December 12, 2018, McEvoy was signed to the Buffalo Bills practice squad.

=== Tennessee Titans ===
On July 31, 2019, McEvoy signed with the Tennessee Titans. He was waived on August 31, 2019.

=== Tampa Bay Vipers ===
On October 16, 2019, McEvoy was selected by the Tampa Bay Vipers in the 2020 XFL Supplemental Draft. As a primarily special teamer and depth player, McEvoy caught one pass for 11 yards in 5 games played. He had his contract terminated when the league suspended operations on April 10, 2020.

== Personal life ==
McEvoy graduated from the University of Wisconsin with a degree in sociology in December 2015. His brother, Colin, played college football at Rutgers. His sister, Christin, attended the College of Charleston in South Carolina.
