= 2015 Holiday Bowl =

2015 National Funding Holiday Bowl
- 38th Holiday Bowl Game
USC Trojans	Wisconsin Badgers
(8–5)	(9–3)
Pac-12	Big Ten
21	23
Head coach: Clay Helton	Head coach: Paul Chryst
AP / Coaches / CFP; NR / NR / 25	AP / Coaches / CFP; 23 / 23 / NR
	1	2	3	4	Total
USC	0	7	7	7	21
Wisconsin	0	13	7	3	23
- Date: December 30, 2015
- Season: 2015
- Stadium: Qualcomm Stadium
- Location: San Diego, California
- MVP: Offense: Joel Stave (QB, Wisconsin); Defense: Jack Cichy (LB, Wisconsin)
- Favorite: USC by 3
- Referee: John McDaid (SEC)
- Attendance: 48,329

United States TV coverage
- Network: ESPN/ESPN Radio
- Announcers: Adam Amin, Kelly Stouffer, & Olivia Harlan (ESPN); Drew Goodman, Tom Ramsey & Marty Cesario (ESPN Radio)

The 2015 Holiday Bowl was an American college football bowl game played on December 30, 2015 at Qualcomm Stadium in San Diego, California. The 38th edition of the Holiday Bowl, it featured Wisconsin from the Big Ten Conference and USC from the Pac-12 Conference. It was one of the 2015–16 bowl games that concluded the 2015 FBS football season. The game started at 7:40 p.m. PST and was telecast on ESPN (also on ESPN Radio). The Badgers defeated the Trojans 23–21.

== Teams ==
This was the seventh overall meeting between these two teams, with USC leading the series 6–0 before this game. The last time these two teams met was in 1966 when #5 USC defeated the unranked Badgers 38–3 in a regular season non-conference game.

== Game summary ==
=== Scoring Summary ===
Scoring summary

Quarter	Time	Drive			Team	Scoring information	Score	
Quarter	Time	Plays	Yards	TOP	Team	Scoring information	USC	WIS
2	13:30	9	50	3:44	WIS	38-yard field goal by Rafael Gaglianone	0	3
2	8:56	6	74	3:19	WIS	Corey Clement 6-yard touchdown run, Rafael Gaglianone kick good	0	10
2	5:17	9	55	3:39	USC	Justin Davis 1-yard touchdown run, Alex Wood kick good	7	10
2	0:26	12	71	4:51	WIS	33-yard field goal by Rafael Gaglianone	7	13
3	7:49	12	64	6:15	WIS	Austin Traylor 4-yard touchdown reception from Joel Stave, Rafael Gaglianone kick good	7	20
3	5:34	5	55	2:15	USC	Justin Davis 1-yard touchdown run, Alex Wood kick good	14	20
4	10:19	12	82	5:08	USC	Darreus Rogers 7-yard touchdown reception from Cody Kessler, Alex Wood kick good	21	20
4	2:27	7	42	3:07	WIS	29-yard field goal by Rafael Gaglianone	21	23
"TOP" = time of possession. For other American football terms, see Glossary of American football.							21	23

=== Statistics ===
Statistics	USC	WIS
First downs	16	22
Plays–yards	61–286	75–394
Rushes–yards	28–65	46–177
Passing yards	221	217
Passing: Comp–Att–Int	18–33–1	18–29–0
Time of possession	22:42	37:18
