= Darius Hillary =

American football player (born 1993)

No. 28, 31, 38, 29, 36, 23
- Position: Cornerback

Personal information
- Born: April 5, 1993 (age 33); Cincinnati, Ohio, U.S.
- Listed height: 5 ft 10 in (1.78 m)
- Listed weight: 183 lb (83 kg)

Career information
- High school: Sycamore (Cincinnati)
- College: Wisconsin
- NFL draft: 2016: undrafted

Career history
- Cincinnati Bengals (2016)*; Cleveland Browns (2016–2017); Oakland Raiders (2017–2018)*; Washington Redskins (2018)*; Cincinnati Bengals (2018)*; New Orleans Saints (2018)*; Arizona Hotshots (2019); Atlanta Legends (2019); St. Louis BattleHawks (2020)
- * Offseason or practice squad member only

Awards and highlights
- Second-team All-Big Ten (2014)
- Stats at Pro Football Reference

Darius Mikail Hillary (born April 5, 1993) is an American former professional football player who was a cornerback in the National Football League (NFL). He played college football for the Wisconsin Badgers.

== College career ==
At Wisconsin, Hillary appeared in 54 games, which tied a school record, while starting in 40 consecutive games to finish his college career. As a senior in 2015, Hillary started all 13 games, recording 44 tackles, six passes defensed, and two fumble recoveries, earning All-Big Ten honorable mention.

== Professional career ==
=== Cincinnati Bengals ===
Hillary signed with the Cincinnati Bengals as an undrafted free agent on April 30, 2016. He was waived on September 3, 2016 and was signed to the practice squad the next day. He was released on October 1, 2016.

=== Cleveland Browns ===
On October 18, 2016, Hillary was signed to the Cleveland Browns' practice squad. He was promoted to the active roster on October 21, 2016. He was waived three days later and re-signed to the practice squad. He signed a reserve/future contract with the Browns on January 2, 2017.

On September 3, 2017, Hillary was waived by the Browns and was re-signed to the practice squad. He was promoted to the active roster on November 8, 2017. He was waived by the Browns on December 16, 2017.

=== Oakland Raiders ===
On December 27, 2017, Hillary was signed to the Oakland Raiders' practice squad. He signed a reserve/future contract with the Raiders on January 2, 2018. He was waived by the Raiders on May 7, 2018.

=== Washington Redskins ===
On August 18, 2018, Hillary was signed by the Washington Redskins, but was waived on August 25.

=== Cincinnati Bengals (second stint) ===
On August 28, 2018, Hillary was signed by the Cincinnati Bengals, only to be waived two days later.

=== New Orleans Saints ===
On October 2, 2018, Hillary was signed to the New Orleans Saints' practice squad. He was released on October 17, 2018.

=== Arizona Hotshots ===
On January 8, 2019, Hillary signed with the Arizona Hotshots of the Alliance of American Football. He was placed on injured reserve on January 30. He was waived from injured reserve on March 19.

=== Atlanta Legends ===
Hillary signed with the Atlanta Legends of the AAF on March 25, 2019, while on the team's rights list. He was activated to the roster on March 26. The league ceased operations in April 2019.

=== St. Louis BattleHawks ===
Hillary was selected by the St. Louis BattleHawks in the XFL Supplemental Draft, and went on to play all 5 games, producing 17 tackles and 3 passes defended, as well as one quarterback hit on a corner blitz. He had his contract terminated when the league suspended operations on April 10, 2020.
