= Tyler Marz =

American football player (born 1992)

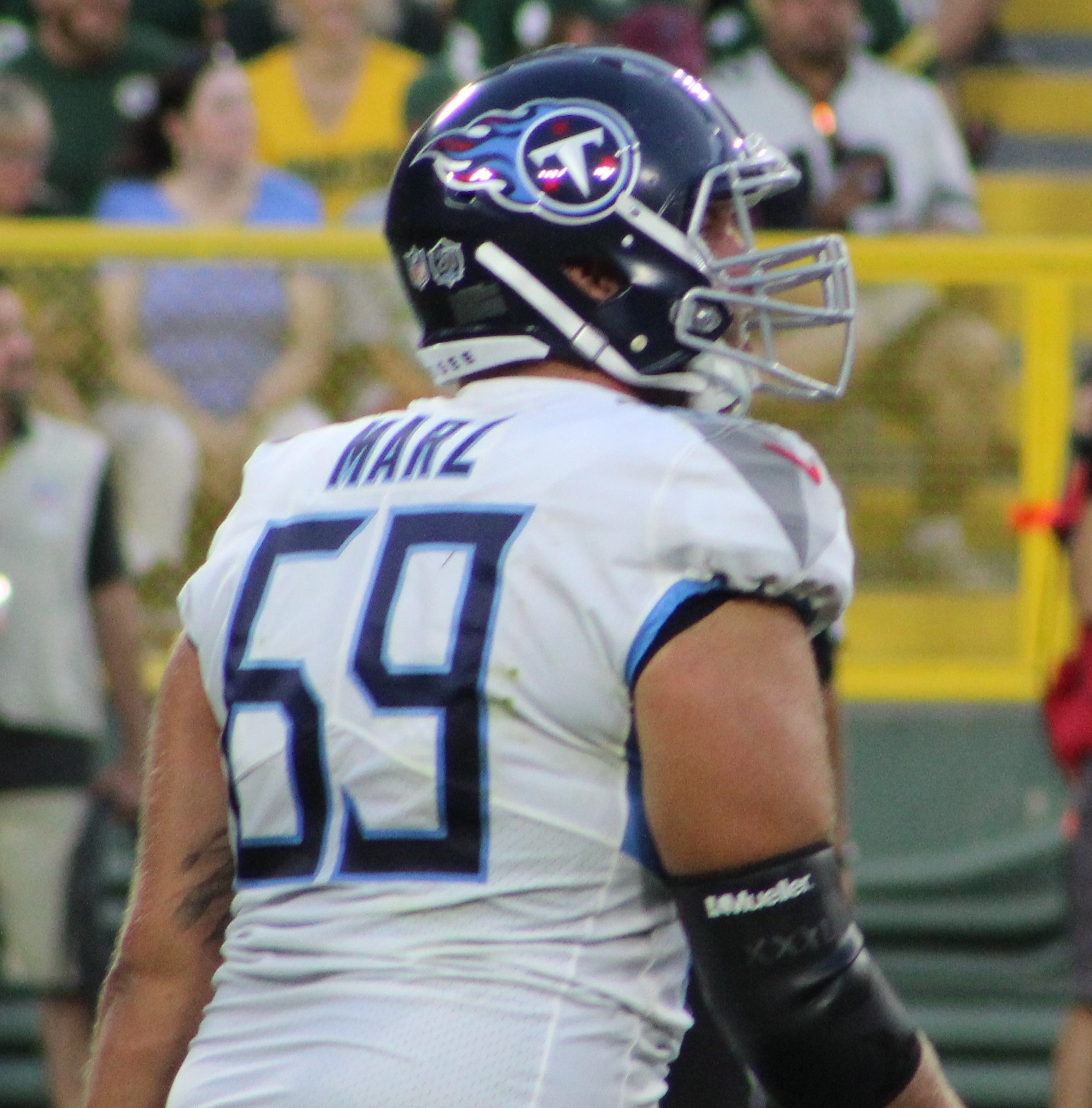
- Marz with the Tennessee Titans in 2018

No. 69
- Position: Offensive tackle

Personal information
- Born: September 9, 1992 (age 34); Springfield, Minnesota, U.S.
- Listed height: 6 ft 7 in (2.01 m)
- Listed weight: 316 lb (143 kg)

Career information
- High school: Springfield
- College: Wisconsin
- NFL draft: 2016: undrafted

Career history
- Tennessee Titans (2016–2017)*; Los Angeles Chargers (2017); Tennessee Titans (2017–2018); Carolina Panthers (2019–2020)*; Miami Dolphins (2021)*
- * Offseason or practice squad member only

Awards and highlights
- Second-team All-Big Ten (2015)

Career NFL statistics
- Games played: 6
- Games started: 1
- Stats at Pro Football Reference

Tyler Jordan Marz (born September 9, 1992) is an American former professional football player who was an offensive tackle in the National Football League (NFL). He played college football for the Wisconsin Badgers.

== Professional career ==
=== Tennessee Titans ===
Marz was signed by the Tennessee Titans as an undrafted free agent on May 9, 2016. He was released during final roster cuts on September 2, 2016, and was signed to the Titans' practice squad the next day. He signed a reserve/future contract with the Titans on January 2, 2017.

On September 2, 2017, Marz was waived by the Titans and was signed to the practice squad the next day.

=== Los Angeles Chargers ===
On September 20, 2017, Marz was signed by the Los Angeles Chargers off the Titans' practice squad. He was waived by the Chargers on November 7, 2017.

=== Tennessee Titans (second stint) ===
On November 9, 2017, Marz was signed to the Titans' practice squad. He signed a reserve/future contract with the Titans on January 15, 2018.

On September 1, 2018, Marz was waived by the Titans and was signed to the practice squad the next day. He was promoted to the active roster on September 15, 2018. On September 16, 2018, Marz made his first career start against the Houston Texans in Week 2.

On August 31, 2019, Marz was waived by the Titans.

=== Carolina Panthers ===
On December 18, 2019, Marz was signed to the Carolina Panthers practice squad. He signed a reserve/future contract with the Panthers on December 30, 2019. He was waived on August 1, 2020.

=== Miami Dolphins ===
On July 28, 2021, Marz signed with the Miami Dolphins. He was waived on August 17.
