= Rafael Gaglianone =

Brazilian gridiron football player (born 1994)

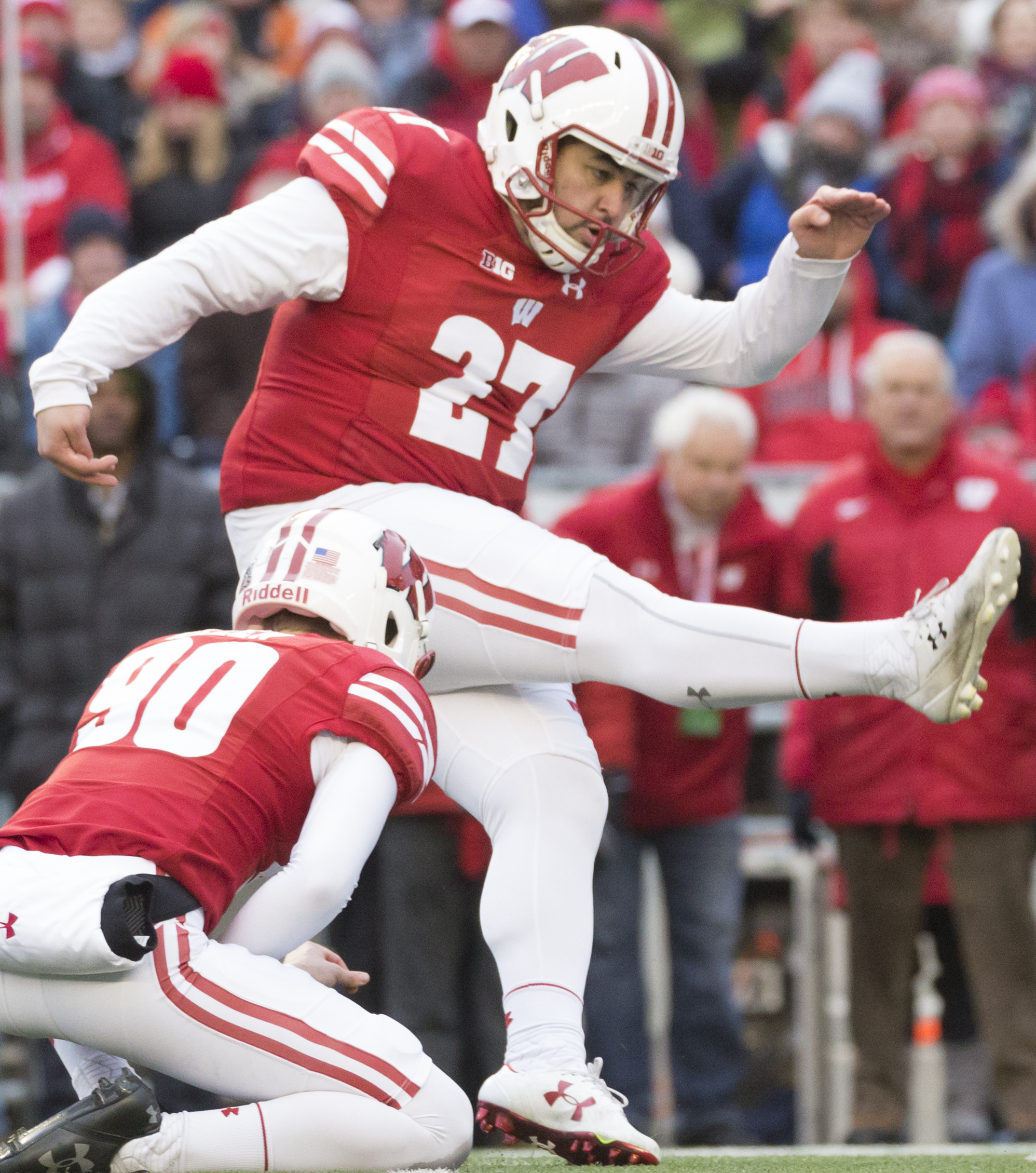
- Gaglianone with Wisconsin in 2017

Profile
- Position: K

Personal information
- Born: 26 December 1994 (age 31); São Paulo, Brazil
- Listed height: 5 ft 11 in (1.80 m)
- Listed weight: 240 lb (109 kg)

Career information
- College: Wisconsin
- CFL draft: 2022G: 2nd round, 17th overall pick

Career history
- 2022: Edmonton Elks*
- * Offseason or practice squad member only

Awards and highlights
- Second-team All-Big Ten (2017); Freshman All-Big Ten Team (2014)

Rafael Gaglianone (born 26 December 1994) is a Brazilian gridiron football placekicker. Born in São Paulo, Brazil, Gaglianone attended Baylor School in Chattanooga, Tennessee. He received scholarship offers from North Carolina State University and the University of Wisconsin, choosing Wisconsin because, “[he] had been in the south for too long.” After finishing his college career, the Big Ten posted on Twitter that he would be returning to Brazil to "work for a company that bridges opportunities for international students to receive scholarships in the USA." In 2022, he was a member of the Edmonton Elks of the Canadian Football League (CFL).

== College career ==
During the 2014–15 season, Gaglianone went 19-for-22 on field goals and 59-for-61 on extra points. In 2015, Gaglianone was named to the Big Ten all-bowl team for kicking a 29-yard field goal with seven seconds left to send the game against Auburn into overtime, and kicking the game winning 25-yard field goal in the first overtime period.

In July 2015, Gaglianone was listed on the Lou Groza Award preseason watchlist. However his sophomore season was not as good as his breakout freshman season, going only 18-for-27 on field goals. He was able to make eight of eight kicks from within 30 yards, though he missed three kicks in the 30s, 40s and 50s. He made game-winning field goals against Nebraska in October and USC in the Holiday Bowl.

On 25 July 2016, it was revealed that Gaglianone would wear No. 27 for the upcoming 2016 football season in honor of his friend, Nebraska punter Sam Foltz, who had died in a car accident days before. He had previously worn No. 10.

To open the 2016 season, Gaglianone was 3-for-3 on field goals (30, 47, 48 yards) against the No. 5 LSU Tigers, including the game-winning field goal in the last two minutes of the game. With the fourth game-winning field goal of his career Gaglianone set the record for the most in school history. Following the game Gaglianone was lauded with multiple 'Player of the Week' awards, including Big Ten special teams player of the week, Rose Bowl Big Ten player of the week and one of three Lou Groza Award Stars of the Week. Gaglianone subsequently missed most of the remainder of the season, due to a back injury. He ended the season having appeared in only three games, making 7-of-8 field goals and 10-of-10 extra points. The season did not count against his four years of NCAA eligibility.

During the 2017 season, Gaglianone appeared in 14 games, making 16-of-18 field goals and all 59 extra points he attempted. Gaglianone returned to Wisconsin for his final collegiate season in 2018.

== Professional career ==
Gaglianone was drafted in the second round (17th overall) of the 2022 CFL global draft by the Edmonton Elks. He signed with the team on May 11, and was moved to the practice roster on June 4, where he spent the entire 2022 CFL season before being released on October 21, 2022. He later re-signed with the Eskimos on January 3, 2023 before being released again on May 16, 2023.
