= Joel Stave =

American football player (born 1992)

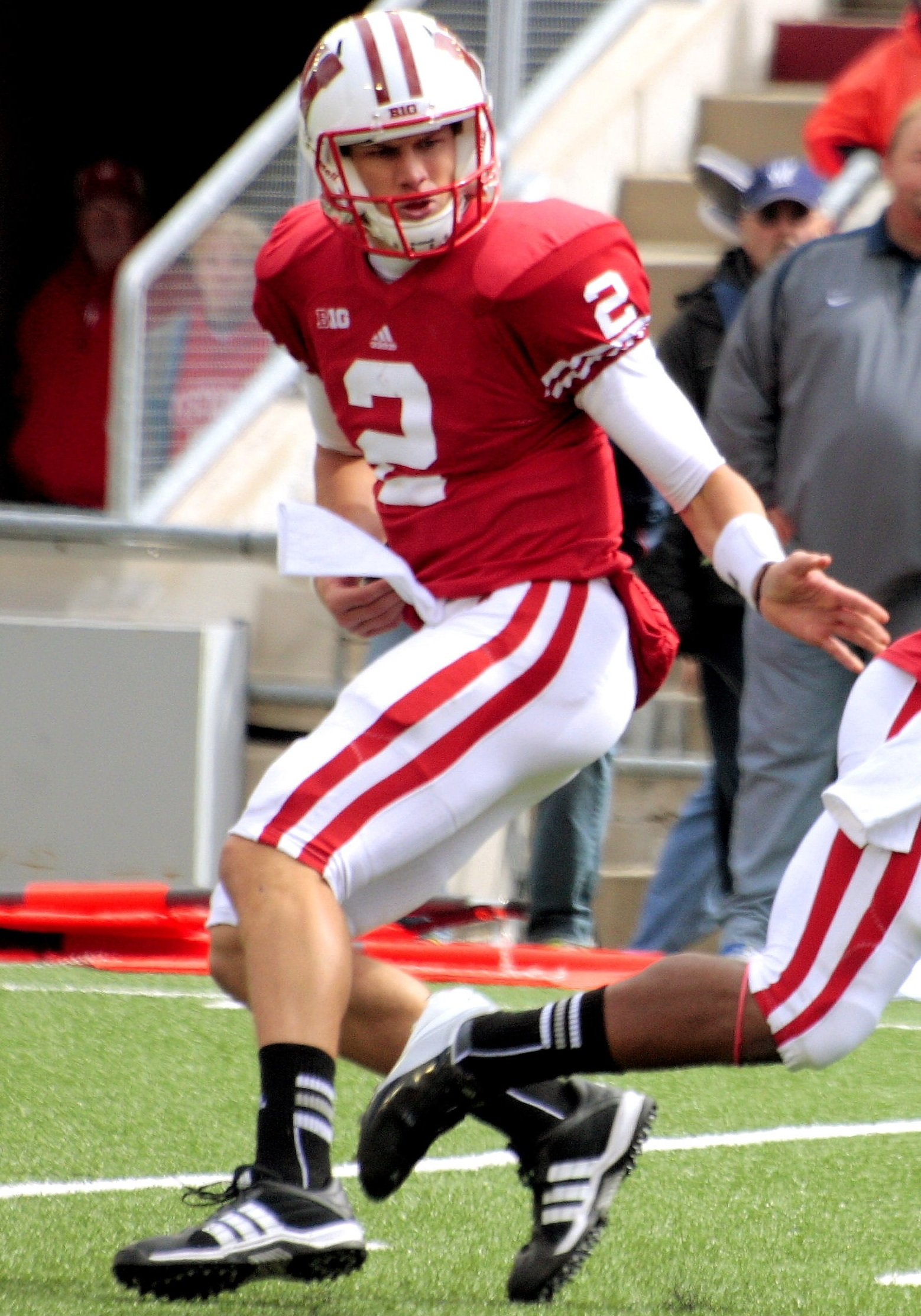
- Stave with the Wisconsin Badgers in 2012

No. 2, 8
- Position: Quarterback

Personal information
- Born: May 16, 1992 (age 34); Greenfield, Wisconsin, U.S.
- Listed height: 6 ft 5 in (1.96 m)
- Listed weight: 236 lb (107 kg)

Career information
- High school: Whitnall (Greenfield, Wisconsin)
- College: Wisconsin (2011–2015)
- NFL draft: 2016: undrafted

Career history
- Minnesota Vikings (2016)*; Seattle Seahawks (2016)*; Kansas City Chiefs (2016–2017)*; Washington Redskins (2017)*; New York Jets (2017)*; Cleveland Browns (2018)*
- * Offseason or practice squad member only
- Stats at Pro Football Reference

Joel Stave (born May 16, 1992) is an American former football quarterback. He played college football at Wisconsin.

== Early life ==
Joel Stave attended Whitnall High School in Greenfield, Wisconsin, where he was a three-year letter winner in football and track and field and two in basketball. As a junior, Stave passed for 4,459 yards and 39 touchdowns and ran for an additional five touchdowns. He was honorable mention all-state by the WFCA, first-team all-region, all-suburban, all-conference, and second-team all-area as a junior. As a senior, Stave threw for 3,635 yards and 47 touchdowns and ran for an additional 2,346 yards and seven touchdowns. He earned first-team all-state honors by the WFCA, honorable mention A.P. all-state honors, unanimous conference player of the year, first-team all-conference and second-team all-region as a senior. In his career with Whitnall, Stave threw for 5,094 yards and 41 touchdowns and added 12 rushing touchdowns.

Following his high school career, Stave was rated a two-star recruit by both Scout.com and Rivals.com. He was also rated the number 17th rated or top 10th player from the state of Wisconsin and the 110th ranked quarterback in the country.

== College career ==
Stave left Wisconsin as the school's all-time winningest quarterback with a 31–10 record as a starter, and his .756 win percentage ranks No. 3 among Wisconsin quarterbacks. In his career with the Badgers, he started 41 games (third-most by a quarterback in school history), and went 22–6 (.786) as a starter against Big Ten opponents, setting school records for wins and winning percentage in conference games. He threw for 7,635 yards and 48 touchdowns, ranking second in school history in both categories, also finishing his career ranked No. 2 in passing attempts (1,031) and completions (613) and No. 4 in completion percentage (59.5%). He threw for over 200 yards in a game 18 times, the most in school history and became the first quarterback in school history with a 4–0 record against an opponent, doing so against Purdue, Illinois and Minnesota. Stave finished his career with a 23–21 win in the Holiday Bowl vs USC and was named offensive MVP of the Holiday Bowl.

In 2011, Stave enrolled in spring semester and took part in spring practice.

On September 15, Stave made his Badgers debut against Utah State. Stave made his first career start on September 22 against UTEP and became the first Wisconsin freshman quarterback to start since Jim Sorgi on October 21, 2012. He recorded a career-high 254 passing yards on October 6 against Illinois. Stave was injured on October 27 against Michigan State missing the rest of the regular season and the 2012 Big Ten Football Championship Game. He returned in the 2013 Rose Bowl and attempted one pass in the game.

Stave recorded his first career rushing touchdown on August 31, 2013, against UMass. Established new career highs in completions (24), attempts (29) and touchdown passes (3) against Tennessee Tech on September 7.

In 2014, Stave passed for 1,350 yards, nine touchdowns, and 10 interceptions in the 2014 season.

As a senior in 2015, Stave passed for 2,687 yards and 11 touchdowns. In winning his final game of his collegiate career Joel Stave was named Holiday Bowl Offensive MVP and captured the title of winningest quarterback in Badgers history with 31 career wins, surpassing Brooks Bollinger's record set in 2002.

Stave finished his career at Wisconsin as program's all-time leader in wins as a starting quarterback, with 31. Stave, a civil engineering major, also finished All-Academic Big Ten four times, breaking a record previously held by Drew Brees. He was also given the Big Ten Medal of Honor in 2016.

=== Statistics ===
Wisconsin Badgers
Season	Games	Games started	Record	Passing							Rushing			
Season	Games	Games started	Record	Comp	Att	Yards	Pct.	TD	Int	QB rating	Att	Yards	Avg	TD
2011	Redshirt													
2012	8	6	4–2	70	119	1,104	58.8	6	3	148.3	19	−51	−2.7	0
2013	13	13	9–4	208	336	2,494	61.9	22	13	138.1	37	−22	−0.6	1
2014	10	9	8–1	110	206	1,350	53.4	9	10	113.2	13	−70	−5.4	0
2015	13	13	10–3	225	370	2,687	60.8	11	11	125.7	33	−123	−3.7	1
Career	44	41	31–10	613	1,031	7,635	59.5	48	37	129.9	102	-266	-2.6	2

== Professional career ==
Pre-draft measurables
Height	Weight	Arm length	Hand span	40-yard dash	10-yard split	20-yard split	20-yard shuttle	Three-cone drill	Vertical jump	Broad jump
6 ft 5 1/4 in (1.96 m)	236 lb (107 kg)	33 1/4 in (0.84 m)	10 3/4 in (0.27 m)	4.80 s	1.56 s	2.77 s	4.33 s	7.29 s	33.5 in (0.85 m)	9 ft 7 in (2.92 m)
All values from NFL Combine

Stave signed as an undrafted free agent with the Minnesota Vikings in 2016. On September 3, 2016, he was released by the Vikings as part of final roster cuts. The next day, he was signed to the Vikings' practice squad. He was released by the Vikings on October 25, 2016.

On October 26, 2016, the Seattle Seahawks signed Stave to their practice squad. He was released by the Seahawks on November 1, 2016.

On November 8, 2016, Stave was signed to the Kansas City Chiefs' practice squad. He signed a reserve/future contract with the Chiefs on January 19, 2017. He was waived on September 2, 2017.

On October 3, 2017, Stave was signed to the Washington Redskins' practice squad. He was released on October 17, 2017.

On December 12, 2017, Stave was signed to the New York Jets' practice squad. He signed a reserve/future contract with the Jets on January 1, 2018. He was waived on April 14, 2018.

On April 30, 2018, Stave was signed by the Cleveland Browns. He was waived by the Browns on May 7, 2018.
