= 2016 Denver Broncos season =

American football team season

- Owner: The Pat Bowlen Trust
- General manager: John Elway
- Head coach: Gary Kubiak; Joe DeCamillis (interim, Week 6)
- Home stadium: Sports Authority Field at Mile High

Results
- Record: 9−7
- Division place: 3rd AFC West
- Playoffs: Did not qualify
- All-Pros: 3: CB Chris Harris Jr. (1st team); LB Von Miller (1st team); CB Aqib Talib (1st team)
- Pro Bowlers: 6: CB Chris Harris Jr.; LB Von Miller; WR Emmanuel Sanders; S Darian Stewart; CB Aqib Talib; WR Demaryius Thomas

Uniform
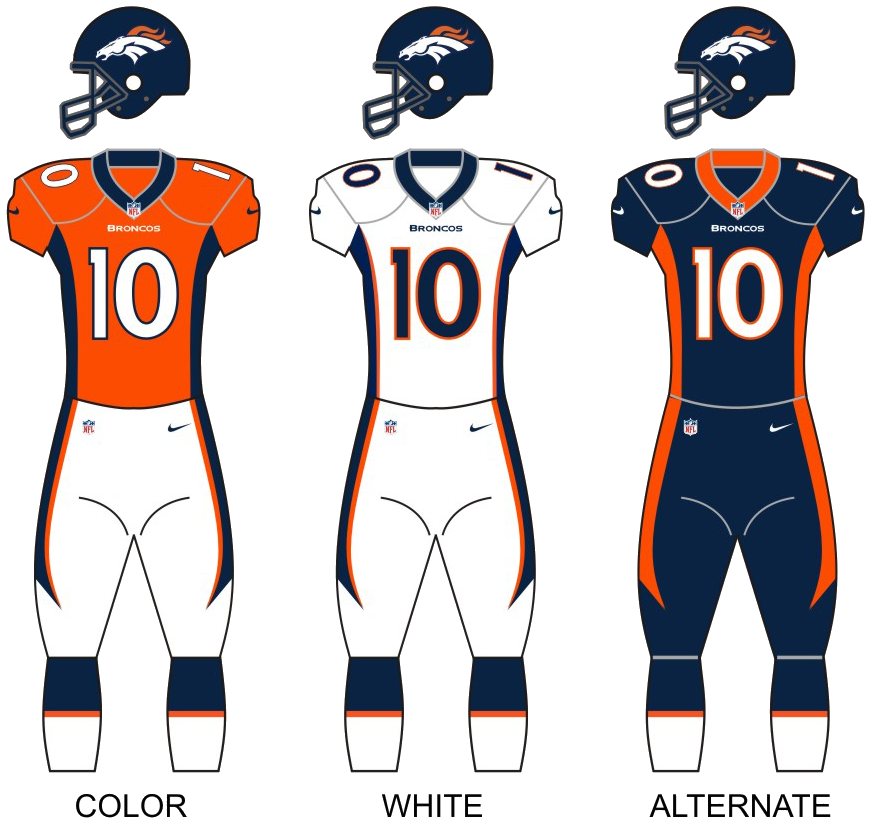

The 2016 season was the Denver Broncos' 47th in the National Football League (NFL) and their 57th overall. This was the first season since 2011 that Peyton Manning was not on the opening day roster. It was also their second and last season under head coach Gary Kubiak, as he retired at the end of the season due to health concerns.

The Broncos entered the season as defending champions of Super Bowl 50, after undergoing numerous roster changes as well as an off-season and preseason that was dominated by a quarterback controversy, following the retirement of Peyton Manning. Following a 4–0 start, the team sputtered down the stretch, missing the playoffs for the first time since 2010, as well as having their franchise-record streak of five consecutive playoff appearances and five consecutive AFC West division titles snapped. In addition, the Broncos became the 12th consecutive team to fail to repeat as Super Bowl champions, as well as the first reigning champion to miss the playoffs since the 2013 Baltimore Ravens. In terms of statistics, the Broncos' offense scored more than 30 points only once and ranked 27th in total offense. Head coach Gary Kubiak abruptly resigned at the end of the season citing health reasons but would remain as a consultant for the Broncos before returning to coaching in 2019 as the assistant head coach/offensive coordinator for the Minnesota Vikings, where he spent 2 seasons before retiring from coaching following the 2020 season.

This was the Broncos' last winning season until 2024.

== Coaching changes ==
- February 12: Brian Callahan, who had served as the Broncos' offensive quality control coach since 2010, was hired as a quarterbacks coach with the Detroit Lions.
- February 16: Klint Kubiak, son of Broncos' head coach Gary Kubiak, was hired as the offensive quality control coach, replacing Brian Callahan. Klint Kubiak previously served as a coaching assistant with the Minnesota Vikings from 2013 to 2014, and was the wide receivers coach for the University of Kansas in 2015.

=== Gary Kubiak's health problems ===
On October 9, shortly after the Broncos' Week 5 loss to the Atlanta Falcons, head coach Gary Kubiak was taken to a Denver-area hospital, after experiencing flu-like symptoms and extreme body fatigue. According to executive vice president/general manager John Elway, Kubiak had been feeling ill prior to the loss to the Falcons, and following a precautionary MRI and CT scan, Kubiak was diagnosed with a "complex migraine." Special teams coordinator Joe DeCamillis served as the team's interim head coach for the team's Week 6 Thursday Night loss at the San Diego Chargers, while Kubiak underwent a doctor-mandated week of rest. This was the second time in three years in which Kubiak experienced a health scare; in November 2013, while serving as the Houston Texans' head coach, Kubiak suffered a mini-stroke after collapsing on the field during a game against the Indianapolis Colts. Concerns over his health ultimately resulted in Kubiak retiring from coaching at the end of the season.

== Roster changes ==
=== Free agents ===
==== Unrestricted ====
Position	Player	2016 Team	Notes
CB/RS	Omar Bolden	Chicago Bears	signed with the Bears on March 31
S	David Bruton	Washington Redskins	signed with the Redskins on March 16
S	Josh Bush	None	originally an RFA
WR	Andre Caldwell	Detroit Lions	signed with the Lions on May 4
TE	Vernon Davis	Washington Redskins	signed with the Redskins on March 31
OT	Ryan Harris	Pittsburgh Steelers	signed with the Steelers on March 15
RB	Ronnie Hillman	Minnesota Vikings	re-signed April 18, released September 3, signed with the Vikings on September 21
DE	Malik Jackson	Jacksonville Jaguars	signed with the Jaguars on March 8
S	Shiloh Keo	New Orleans Saints	re-signed April 18, suspended for the first two games, released October 25, signed with the Saints on November 9
G	Evan Mathis	Arizona Cardinals	signed with the Cardinals on March 16
LB	Lerentee McCray	Green Bay Packers	originally an RFA, signed with the Packers on April 18
LB	Von Miller	Denver Broncos	assigned franchise tag on March 1, re-signed July 15
WR	Jordan Norwood	Denver Broncos	re-signed March 23
QB	Brock Osweiler	Houston Texans	signed with the Texans on March 9
OT	Tyler Polumbus	None	retired April 5
DE	Antonio Smith	Houston Texans	signed with the Texans on September 28
LB	Danny Trevathan	Chicago Bears	signed with the Bears on March 9
WR	Kyle Williams	New York Jets	signed with the Jets on June 17
DE	Derek Wolfe	Denver Broncos	re-signed January 15

==== Restricted ====
Position	Player	2016 Team	Notes
RB	C. J. Anderson	Denver Broncos	signed to offer sheet by the Miami Dolphins on March 10, Broncos matched offer and re-signed Anderson on March 15, placed on injured reserve on October 28
LB	Todd Davis	Denver Broncos	originally an ERFA
LB	Brandon Marshall	Denver Broncos	assigned tender on March 21, re-signed June 14

==== Exclusive-Rights ====
Position	Player	2016 Team	Notes
C	Sam Brenner	Denver Broncos	signed tender on April 15, designated as waived/injured on August 5
WR	Bennie Fowler	Denver Broncos	signed tender on April 15
PK	Brandon McManus	Denver Broncos	signed tender on April 19
C	Matt Paradis	Denver Broncos	signed tender on April 15

=== Signings ===
Position	Player	2015 Team	Notes
WR	Marlon Brown	Baltimore Ravens	signed July 27, designated as waived/injured on August 4, re-signed November 21, placed on injured reserve on December 10
DE	Jared Crick	Houston Texans	signed April 6
QB	Austin Davis	Cleveland Browns	signed September 2
RB	Justin Forsett	Baltimore Ravens; Detroit Lions	claimed off waivers from the Lions on December 5
LS	Thomas Gafford	Chicago Bears; Oakland Raiders	signed November 25
TE	Manasseh Garner	None	signed to a future contract on January 12, waived July 28, re-signed August 19, waived August 29
LB	Quentin Gause	Practice squad	promoted to the active roster on December 16
TE	Richard Gordon	Denver Broncos	signed February 22, waived May 4
TE	Garrett Graham	Houston Texans	signed April 25, placed on injured reserve August 30
LS	Casey Kreiter	Dallas Cowboys	signed April 7, placed on injured reserve on December 16
NT	Henry Melton	Tampa Bay Buccaneers	signed August 22, released September 2
WR	Jakari Johnson	Practice squad	signed August 8, waived September 2, assigned to the practice squad on September 4
OT	Russell Okung	Seattle Seahawks	signed March 17
FB	Toben Opurum	New Orleans Saints	claimed off waivers on May 10, waived May 12
TE	John Phillips	San Diego Chargers	signed July 28, released November 5
S	Brandian Ross	San Diego Chargers	signed April 18, released August 29
OT	Donald Stephenson	Kansas City Chiefs	signed March 9
NT	Phil Taylor	None	signed February 22, placed on injured reserve July 31
G	Billy Turner	Miami Dolphins	signed October 17
DE	Billy Winn	Indianapolis Colts	signed July 31
LB	Dekoda Watson	New England Patriots	signed May 16

Indicates that the player was a free agent at the end of his respective team's 2015 season.

=== Departures ===
Position	Player	Notes
DE	Kenny Anunike	waived August 8
LS	Aaron Brewer	released March 8
P	Britton Colquitt	released August 30
TE	Owen Daniels	released March 8
NT	Darius Kilgo	waived November 25
CB	Taurean Nixon	waived September 2, assigned to the practice squad on September 4, re-signed November 5, waived November 21, promoted to the active roster on December 28
RB	Juwan Thompson	waived September 2, assigned to the practice squad on September 4, re-signed October 29
G	Louis Vasquez	released March 8
G	Darrion Weems	waived October 17

=== Retirement of Peyton Manning ===
On March 7, two days before the start of the 2016 league year, quarterback Peyton Manning retired after 18 NFL seasons. In his four seasons with the Broncos (2012–2015), Manning threw for 17,112 passing yards and 140 touchdowns, both second in franchise history behind John Elway. Manning also set numerous league records, including single-season passing yardage (5,477) and single-season touchdown passes (55), both of which were achieved in 2013.

Since his retirement, four of Manning's records have been surpassed by either Tom Brady or Drew Brees: combined regular season and postseason wins (200 – surpassed by Brady in 2016), regular season wins (186 – tied with Brett Favre, surpassed by Brady in 2017), regular season passing yardage (surpassed by Brees in 2018) and regular season touchdown passes (surpassed by Brees in 2019 and then again by Brady in 2020).

Manning was also one of two remaining active players who were drafted and had played in the 1990s—the other being fellow 1998 draftee Charles Woodson of the Oakland Raiders. Woodson also retired following the 2015 season, making 2015 the last one to feature players drafted in the 1990s.

=== Trades ===
- March 11: The Broncos acquired quarterback Mark Sanchez in a trade that would have sent a 2017 seventh-round selection to the Philadelphia Eagles; however, Sanchez was released on September 2, voiding the trade.
- April 9: The Broncos were involved in a trade that sent offensive tackle Ryan Clady to the New York Jets (see draft section below).
- October 25: The Broncos acquired tight end A. J. Derby in a trade that sent a 2017 fifth-round selection to the New England Patriots.

=== Draft ===
2016 Denver Broncos Draft
Round	Selection	Player	Position	College	Notes
1	26	Paxton Lynch	QB	Memphis	signed June 9
2	63	Adam Gotsis	DT	Georgia Tech	signed May 25
3	98 *	Justin Simmons	S	Boston College	signed May 13
4	136 *	Devontae Booker	RB	Utah	signed May 13
5	144	Connor McGovern	G	Missouri	signed May 16
6	176	Andy Janovich	FB	Nebraska	signed May 12, placed on injured reserve on December 1
6	219 *	Will Parks	S	Arizona	signed May 12
7	228	Riley Dixon	P	Syracuse	signed May 11

*	Compensatory selection

==== Draft trades ====
Trade partner	Broncos give	Broncos receive	Source
Baltimore Ravens	Original 2016 fourth-round selection (No. 130)	2016 fifth-round selection (No. 144); Center Gino Gradkowski	
Detroit Lions	2015 first- and fifth-round selections Original 2016 fifth-round selection (No. 169); 2016 sixth-round selection (No. 176); Guard/Center Manny Ramirez	2015 first-round selection	
Houston Texans	Offensive tackle Chris Clark	2016 seventh-round selection (No. 235 – later traded to the New York Jets)	
New York Jets	2016 seventh-round selection (No. 235); Offensive tackle Ryan Clady	2016 fifth-round selection (No. 157 – later traded to the Tennessee Titans)	
San Francisco 49ers	Original 2016 sixth-round selection (No. 207); 2017 sixth-round selection	2016 seventh-round selection (No. 228); Tight end Vernon Davis	
Seattle Seahawks	2016 first-round selection (No. 31); 2016 third-round selection (No. 94)	2016 first-round selection (No. 26)	
Tennessee Titans	2016 fifth-round selection (No. 157); Original 2016 seventh-round selection (No. 253)	2016 sixth-round selection (No. 176); 2017 sixth-round selection	

=== Undrafted free agents ===
All undrafted free agents were signed after the 2016 NFL draft concluded on April 30, unless noted otherwise.

2016 Denver Broncos undrafted free agents
Player	Position	College	Notes
WR	Bralon Addison	Oregon	waived August 30
OT	Sam Carlson	Colorado State	signed August 4, waived August 22
DE	Vontarrius Dora	Louisiana Tech	waived September 2, assigned to the practice squad on September 4, promoted to the active roster on December 16 on final roster
G	Mathu Gibson	Wingate	signed August 5, waived August 29
WR	Mose Frazier	Memphis	waived September 2, assigned to the practice squad on September 4
S	Antonio Glover	Georgia Southern	waived August 29
OT	Lars Hanson	Sacramento State	waived September 2
DT	Calvin Heurtelou	Miami (Florida)	waived August 29
DE	Shaneil Jenkins	Shepherd	waived August 2
DE	Lars Koht	Florida International	signed August 2, waived September 2
LB	Kyle Kragen	California	waived September 2, assigned to the practice squad on September 4
TE	Henry Krieger-Coble	Iowa	waived September 2, assigned to the practice squad on September 4, promoted to the active roster on December 23, on final roster
NT	David Moala	Utah State	waived August 29
G	Justin Murray	Cincinnati	waived September 2, assigned to the practice squad on September 4
WR	Durron Neal	Oklahoma	waived August 29
G	Aaron Neary	Eastern Washington	waived September 2
LB	Dwayne Norman	Duke	waived September 2
TE	Anthony Norris	Southern Utah	waived May 10
NT	Kyle Peko	Oregon State	the only undrafted rookie to make the Week 1 roster; waived September 20, assigned to the practice squad on September 22, promoted to the active roster on December 28, on final roster
WR	Kalif Raymond	Holy Cross	waived September 2, assigned to the practice squad on September 5, promoted to the active roster on December 2
LB	Darnell Sankey	Sacramento State	signed July 26, waived August 29
LB	Frank Shannon	Oklahoma	waived August 29
LB	Sadat Sulleyman	Portland State	waived September 2
LS	Nathan Theus	Georgia	waived July 26
CB	John Tidwell	Sioux Falls	waived September 2
DE	Eddie Yarbrough	Wyoming	waived September 2

=== Suspensions ===
On August 12, safety Shiloh Keo was suspended for the first two games of the 2016 season for violating the league's substance abuse policy. The suspension was a result of a DUI arrest in Idaho in February.

=== Injuries ===
- August 12: One day after the Broncos' first preseason game against the Chicago Bears, wide receiver Bennie Fowler revealed that he suffered a fractured elbow after blocking a punt. Fowler missed the first two games of the season.
- August 15: Defensive end Vance Walker suffered a ruptured ACL in his right knee during practice, and was placed on the season-ending injured reserve four days later (August 19).
- September 18: Linebacker DeMarcus Ware suffered an ulna fracture in his right forearm, during the Broncos' Week 2 win over the Indianapolis Colts. Ware collided with teammate Von Miller, with both converging on a sack attempt of Colts' quarterback Andrew Luck. Ware missed six weeks of action, before returning in Week 8.
- October 24: Running back C. J. Anderson suffered an injury to his right knee during the first quarter of the Broncos' Week 7 win over the Houston Texans, though he returned in the second quarter and played the remainder of the game. Two days later (October 26), media reports indicated that Anderson missed practice and sought multiple medical opinions on his knee. After an MRI revealed that he suffered meniscus damage, Anderson was placed on injured reserve, and will miss a minimum of eight weeks. Also on October 24, linebacker Brandon Marshall suffered a hamstring injury, and missed the team's Week 9 loss to the Oakland Raiders.
- November 6: Defensive tackle Derek Wolfe suffered a hairline fracture in his elbow during the team's Week 9 loss to the Oakland Raiders, and missed the team's Week 10 win over the New Orleans Saints.
- Weeks 8–10: Cornerback Aqib Talib missed three games due to a lower back injury.
- December 1: Fullback Andy Janovich, the team's sixth-round draft selection, was placed on injured reserve, after undergoing ankle surgery two days earlier.
- December 6: Running back Kapri Bibbs was placed on the season-ending injured reserve, after suffering a high ankle sprain during the team's Week 13 win over the Jacksonville Jaguars.
- December 10: Wide receiver Marlon Brown was placed on injured reserve due to recurring back injuries.
- December 16: Long snapper Casey Kreiter was placed on injured reserve, four weeks after suffering a calf injury during the team's Week 10 win over the New Orleans Saints.

Brandon Marshall

Linebacker Brandon Marshall missed multiple games due to a hamstring injury – the Broncos' Week 6 loss to the San Diego Chargers as well as the team's Week 14 loss to the Tennessee Titans.

Trevor Siemian

Quarterback Trevor Siemian missed two games due to injury. He suffered a sprain to his non-throwing shoulder during the team's Week 4 win over the Tampa Bay Buccaneers that kept him out of the Broncos' Week 5 loss to the Atlanta Falcons the following week. Siemian also suffered a sprained foot during the Broncos' Week 12 loss to the Kansas City Chiefs that kept him out of the team's Week 13 win over the Jacksonville Jaguars the following week. Backup quarterback Paxton Lynch, the team's first-round draft selection, filled in for Siemian in Weeks 4, 5 and 13.

== Quarterback selection ==
Following the retirement of Peyton Manning, the Broncos underwent a process to select a new quarterback throughout the entire off-season and preseason. Brock Osweiler, Manning's backup quarterback from 2012 to 2015, signed with the Houston Texans as a free agent. Mark Sanchez was acquired in a trade with the Philadelphia Eagles, and the Broncos selected Paxton Lynch during the first round of the draft. Sanchez, Lynch and second-year quarterback Trevor Siemian competed for the starting quarterback position, with Siemian being named the starting quarterback for the start of the regular season and Sanchez being released on September 3. Following Sanchez's release, the Broncos signed Austin Davis, who was later waived on December 23.

== Staff ==
2016 Denver Broncos staff
Front office: Owner – The Pat Bowlen Trust; President/chairman/CEO – Joe Ellis; Executive vice president of football operations/general manager – John Elway; Director of football administration – Mike Sullivan; Director of player personnel – Matt Russell; Director of pro personnel – Tom Heckert Jr.; Director of college scouting – Adam Peters; Assistant director of pro personnel – A. J. Durso; Director of football analytics – Mitch Tanney; Head coaches: Head coach – Gary Kubiak; Offensive coaches: Offensive coordinator – Rick Dennison; Quarterbacks/passing game coordinator – Greg Knapp; Running backs – Eric Studesville; Wide receivers – Tyke Tolbert; Assistant wide receivers – Marc Lubick; Tight ends – Brian Pariani; Offensive line – Clancy Barone; Assistant offensive line – James Cregg; Offensive assistant/quarterbacks – Klint Kubiak	Defensive coaches: Defensive coordinator – Wade Phillips; Defensive line – Bill Kollar; Linebackers – Reggie Herring; Outside linebackers – Fred Pagac; Defensive backs – Joe Woods; Assistant defensive backs – Samson Brown; Defensive assistant/defensive line – Chris Beake; Special teams coaches: Special teams coordinator – Joe DeCamillis; Assistant special teams – Tony Coaxum; Strength and conditioning: Strength and conditioning – Luke Richesson; Assistant strength and conditioning – Mike Eubanks; Assistant strength and conditioning – Anthony Lomando; Assistant strength and conditioning – Dennis Love

== Final roster ==
2016 Denver Broncos roster
Quarterbacks (QB): 12 Paxton Lynch; 13 Trevor Siemian; Running backs (RB): 23 Devontae Booker; 20 Justin Forsett; 40 Juwan Thompson; Wide receivers (WR): 16 Bennie Fowler; 14 Cody Latimer; 11 Jordan Norwood; 19 Kalif Raymond; 10 Emmanuel Sanders; 87 Jordan Taylor; 88 Demaryius Thomas; Tight ends (TE): 83 A. J. Derby; 85 Virgil Green; 82 Jeff Heuerman; 84 Henry Krieger-Coble	Offensive linemen (OL): 53 James Ferentz C; 76 Max Garcia G; 60 Connor McGovern G; 73 Russell Okung T; 61 Matt Paradis C; 74 Ty Sambrailo T; 79 Michael Schofield G; 71 Donald Stephenson T; 70 Billy Turner G; Defensive linemen (DL): 93 Jared Crick DE; 99 Adam Gotsis DE; 90 Kyle Peko NT; 92 Sylvester Williams NT; 97 Billy Winn DE; 95 Derek Wolfe DE	Linebackers (LB): 50 Zaire Anderson ILB; 48 Shaquil Barrett OLB; 51 Todd Davis ILB; 59 Vontarrius Dora OLB; 49 Quentin Gause ILB; 54 Brandon Marshall ILB; 58 Von Miller OLB; 52 Corey Nelson ILB; 56 Shane Ray OLB; 57 Dekoda Watson OLB; Defensive backs (DB): 37 Lorenzo Doss CB; 25 Chris Harris Jr. CB; 39 Taurean Nixon CB; 34 Will Parks SS; 29 Bradley Roby CB; 31 Justin Simmons S; 26 Darian Stewart FS; 21 Aqib Talib CB; 43 T. J. Ward SS; Special teams (ST): 9 Riley Dixon P; 8 Brandon McManus K; 45 Thomas Gafford LS	Practice squad: 30 Zac Brooks RB; 55 Dillon Day C; 69 Reese Dismukes C; 98 Iosia Iosia DE; 64 Justin Murray T; 91 Travis Raciti DE; 81 Steven Scheu TE; 17 Hunter Sharp WR; 46 Kevin Snyder OLB; 86 Austin Traylor TE; Reserve: 22 C. J. Anderson RB (IR); 35 Kapri Bibbs RB (IR); 67 Sam Brenner G (IR); 15 Marlon Brown WR (IR); 32 Andy Janovich FB (IR); 42 Casey Kreiter LS (IR); 96 Vance Walker DE (IR); 94 DeMarcus Ware OLB (IR); 36 Kayvon Webster CB (IR); Rookies in italics 53 active, 9 reserve, 10 practice squad

== Preseason ==
Week	Date	Opponent	Result	Record	Venue	Recap
1	August 11	at Chicago Bears	W 22–0	1–0	Soldier Field	Recap
2	August 20	San Francisco 49ers	L 24–31	1–1	Sports Authority Field at Mile High	Recap
3	August 27	Los Angeles Rams	W 17–9	2–1	Sports Authority Field at Mile High	Recap
4	September 1	at Arizona Cardinals	L 17–38	2–2	University of Phoenix Stadium	Recap

== Regular season ==
=== Schedule ===
As the result of winning Super Bowl 50, the Broncos earned the right to host the Week 1 kickoff game on Thursday, September 8, in a Super Bowl rematch versus the Carolina Panthers. The Broncos' 2016 schedule was announced on April 14.

Week	Date	Opponent	Result	Record	Venue	Recap
1	September 8	Carolina Panthers	**W** 21–20	1–0	Sports Authority Field at Mile High	Recap
2	September 18	Indianapolis Colts	**W** 34–20	2–0	Sports Authority Field at Mile High	Recap
3	September 25	at Cincinnati Bengals	**W** 29–17	3–0	Paul Brown Stadium	Recap
4	October 2	at Tampa Bay Buccaneers	**W** 27–7	4–0	Raymond James Stadium	Recap
5	October 9	Atlanta Falcons	**L** 16–23	4–1	Sports Authority Field at Mile High	Recap
6	October 13	at **San Diego Chargers**	**L** 13–21	4–2	Qualcomm Stadium	Recap
7	October 24	Houston Texans	**W** 27–9	5–2	Sports Authority Field at Mile High	Recap
8	October 30	**San Diego Chargers**	**W** 27–19	6–2	Sports Authority Field at Mile High	Recap
9	November 6	at **Oakland Raiders**	**L** 20–30	6–3	Oakland Alameda Coliseum	Recap
10	November 13	at New Orleans Saints	**W** 25–23	7–3	Mercedes-Benz Superdome	Recap
11	Bye					
12	November 27	**Kansas City Chiefs**	**L** 27–30 (OT)	7–4	Sports Authority Field at Mile High	Recap
13	December 4	at Jacksonville Jaguars	**W** 20–10	8–4	EverBank Field	Recap
14	December 11	at Tennessee Titans	**L** 10–13	8–5	Nissan Stadium	Recap
15	December 18	New England Patriots	**L** 3–16	8–6	Sports Authority Field at Mile High	Recap
16	December 25	at **Kansas City Chiefs**	**L** 10–33	8–7	Arrowhead Stadium	Recap
17	January 1	**Oakland Raiders**	**W** 24–6	9–7	Sports Authority Field at Mile High	Recap

Note: Intra-division opponents are in bold text.

=== Game summaries ===
==== Week 1: vs. Carolina Panthers ====
NFL Kickoff game

Week One: Carolina Panthers at Denver Broncos – Game summary

Quarter	1	2	3	4	Total
Panthers	7	10	0	3	**20**
**Broncos**	0	7	0	14	**21**

at Sports Authority Field at Mile High, Denver, Colorado

- Date: September 8
- Game time: 6:30 p.m. MDT
- Game weather: 85 °F (29 °C), sunny and clear
- Game attendance: 76,843
- Referee: Gene Steratore
- TV announcers (NBC): Al Michaels, Cris Collinsworth and Michele Tafoya
- Recap, Gamebook

Game information

**First quarter**

- CAR – Kelvin Benjamin 14-yard pass from Cam Newton (Graham Gano kick), 7:13. Panthers 7–0. **Drive: 8 plays, 71 yards, 4:24.**

**Second quarter**

- DEN – Andy Janovich 28-yard run (Brandon McManus kick), 12:16. Tied 7–7. **Drive: 5 plays, 80 yards, 2:36.**
- CAR – Cam Newton 2-yard run (Graham Gano kick), 3:01. Panthers 14–7. **Drive: 18 plays, 89 yards, 9:15.**
- CAR – Graham Gano 44-yard field goal, 0:03. Panthers 17–7. **Drive: 7 plays, 52 yards, 1:42.**

**Third quarter**

- No scoring plays

**Fourth quarter**

- DEN – C. J. Anderson 25-yard pass from Trevor Siemian (Brandon McManus kick), 14:50. Panthers 17–14. **Drive: 8 plays, 78 yards, 4:08.**
- DEN – C. J. Anderson 1-yard run (Brandon McManus kick), 9:26. Broncos 21–17. **Drive: 10 plays, 23 yards, 4:41.**
- CAR – Graham Gano 36-yard field goal, 4:21. Broncos 21–20. **Drive: 10 plays, 57 yards, 5:05.**

**Top passers**

- CAR – Cam Newton – 18/33, 194 yards, TD, INT
- DEN – Trevor Siemian – 18/26, 178 yards, TD, 2 INT

**Top rushers**

- CAR – Jonathan Stewart – 15 rushes, 64 yards
- DEN – C. J. Anderson – 20 rushes, 92 yards, TD

**Top receivers**

- CAR – Kelvin Benjamin – 6 receptions, 91 yards, TD
- DEN – Emmanuel Sanders – 5 receptions, 49 yards

In a rematch of Super Bowl 50, the defending champion Broncos played host to the Carolina Panthers, in the opening kickoff game. This was the Panthers' first visit to Denver since 2004. Following a fumble on the Broncos' initial possession, the Panthers grabbed the early lead, with a 14-yard touchdown pass from quarterback Cam Newton to wide receiver Kelvin Benjamin. The Broncos responded early in the second quarter, with a 28-yard touchdown by fullback Andy Janovich on his first rushing attempt. The Panthers then re-claimed the lead, with Newton rushing for a 2-yard touchdown, in an 18-play, 89-yard drive that took nine minutes off the clock. After the Broncos' offense went three-and-out, the Panthers added to their lead just before halftime, with a 44-yard field goal by placekicker Graham Gano.

Following a scoreless third quarter, the Broncos pulled to within a 17–14 deficit on the first play of the fourth quarter, with quarterback Trevor Siemian connecting on a 25-yard touchdown pass to running back C. J. Anderson. On the second play of the Panthers' next drive, Newton was intercepted by cornerback Chris Harris Jr. at the Panthers' 38-yard line, giving the Broncos excellent field position. Ten plays later, the Broncos grabbed their first lead of the game, with Anderson rushing up the middle for a 1-yard touchdown at the 9:30 mark of the fourth quarter. The Panthers methodically marched down the field, hoping to re-claim the lead, but had to settle for a 36-yard field goal by Gano to pull to within a 21–20 deficit with 4:25 remaining.

After the Broncos' went three-and-out, the Panthers had one last offensive possession. On the first play after the two-minute warning, the Panthers were facing a 4th-and-21 at their own 29-yard line, and a pass from Newton intended for Benjamin was incomplete; however, Harris was flagged for a facemask penalty, giving the Panthers a new set of downs. With 47 seconds remaining, Newton was flagged for intentional grounding with the Panthers at their own 47-yard line, but Broncos' cornerback Darian Stewart was also flagged for roughing the passer, with a helmet hit on Newton, resulting in both penalties offsetting. With only 14 seconds remaining, Newton completed a crucial pass to wide receiver Ted Ginn Jr. at the Broncos' 32-yard line, setting up Gano for a potential game-winning field goal. After the Broncos called a timeout in order to ice the kicker, Gano's 50-yard field goal attempt sailed wide left, sealing the win for the Broncos.

Notes

Andy Janovich became only the third player in Broncos' franchise history to score on his first rushing attempt; the other two are fullback Kyle Johnson and quarterback Bradlee Van Pelt, both of which occurred in 2005.

==== Week 2: vs. Indianapolis Colts ====
Week Two: Indianapolis Colts at Denver Broncos – Game summary

Quarter	1	2	3	4	Total
Colts	3	3	7	7	**20**
**Broncos**	3	10	3	18	**34**

at Sports Authority Field at Mile High, Denver, Colorado

- Date: September 18
- Game time: 2:25 pm. MDT
- Game weather: 85 °F (29 °C), sunny
- Game attendance: 76,379
- Referee: Walt Coleman
- TV announcers (CBS): Jim Nantz, Phil Simms and Tracy Wolfson
- Recap, Gamebook

Game information

**First quarter**

- IND – Adam Vinatieri 48-yard field goal, 8:17. Colts 3–0. **Drive: 7 plays, 26 yards, 3:24.**
- DEN – Brandon McManus 23-yard field goal, 5:30. Tied 3–3. **Drive: 7 plays, 70 yards, 2:47.**

**Second quarter**

- DEN – C. J. Anderson 4-yard run (Brandon McManus kick), 11:41. Broncos 10–3. **Drive: 6 plays, 69 yards, 3:19.**
- IND – Adam Vinatieri 52-yard field goal, 2:43. Broncos 10–6. **Drive: 9 plays, 21 yards, 3:36.**
- DEN – Brandon McManus 43-yard field goal, 0:05. Broncos 13–6. **Drive: 11 plays, 50 yards, 2:38.**

**Third quarter**

- IND – Robert Turbin 5-yard run (Adam Vinatieri kick), 8:06. Tied 13–13. **Drive: 13 plays, 79 yards, 6:54.**
- DEN – Brandon McManus 33-yard field goal, 1:09. Broncos 16–13. **Drive: 13 plays, 60 yards, 6:57.**

**Fourth quarter**

- DEN – Aqib Talib 46-yard interception return (Brandon McManus kick), 13:52. Broncos 23–13.
- IND – Frank Gore 7-yard pass from Andrew Luck (Adam Vinatieri kick), 4:02. Broncos 23–20. **Drive: 12 plays, 80 yards, 5:28.**
- DEN – Brandon McManus 35-yard field goal, 1:51. Broncos 26–20. **Drive: 8 plays, 58 yards, 2:11.**
- DEN – Shane Ray 15-yard fumble return (Trevor Siemian–Demaryius Thomas pass), 1:42. Broncos 34–20.

**Top passers**

- IND – Andrew Luck – 21/40, 197 yards, TD, INT
- DEN – Trevor Siemian – 22/33, 266 yards, INT

**Top rushers**

- IND – Frank Gore – 13 rushes, 44 yards
- DEN – C. J. Anderson – 20 rushes, 74 yards, TD

**Top receivers**

- IND – T. Y. Hilton – 4 receptions, 41 yards
- DEN – Demaryius Thomas – 5 receptions, 90 yards

The two teams exchanged field goals in the first quarter, with a 48-yarder by Colts' placekicker Adam Vinatieri and a 23-yarder by Broncos' placekicker Brandon McManus. A 4-yard touchdown run by running back C. J. Anderson gave the Broncos the lead early in the second quarter. Vinatieri and McManus once again exchanged field goals late in the first half, with a 52-yarder by Vinatieri and a 43-yarder by McManus just before halftime. The Colts took the initial possession of the second half and tied the game at 13–13 midway through the third quarter, with running back Robert Turbin rushing for a 5-yard touchdown. However, the Broncos took the lead for good later in the third quarter, with a 33-yard field goal by McManus. On the Colts' next possession, quarterback Andrew Luck was intercepted by Broncos' cornerback Aqib Talib, who scampered 46 yards down the sideline for a touchdown to give the Broncos a 23–13 lead early in the fourth quarter. Following an exchange of punts, the Colts narrowed the Broncos' lead, with Luck connecting with running back Frank Gore on a 7-yard touchdown pass with four minutes remaining in the game. The Broncos then increased their lead to 26–20 on the first play after the two-minute warning, with McManus' fourth field goal of the game—a 35-yarder—and in the process, forced the Colts to burn all three of their timeouts. The Colts had one last offensive possession, hoping for a game-winning drive, however, on the very first play from scrimmage, Luck was strip-sacked by Broncos' linebacker Von Miller, and linebacker Shane Ray returned the fumble 15 yards for a game-clinching touchdown (with a two-point conversion pass from quarterback Trevor Siemian to wide receiver Demaryius Thomas).

Notes

Demaryius Thomas passed Ed McCaffrey for fourth-place on the Broncos' all-time career receptions list – at the time, Thomas only trailed Lionel Taylor, Shannon Sharpe and Rod Smith, and surpassed Taylor in 2017. This was the only game during the 2016 season in which the Broncos scored 30 or more points.

==== Week 3: at Cincinnati Bengals ====
Week Three: Denver Broncos at Cincinnati Bengals – Game summary

Quarter	1	2	3	4	Total
**Broncos**	3	13	0	13	**29**
Bengals	7	7	0	3	**17**

at Paul Brown Stadium, Cincinnati, Ohio

- Date: September 25
- Game time: 1:00 p.m. EDT/11:00 am. MDT
- Game weather: 81 °F (27 °C), sunny
- Game attendance: 63,850
- Referee: John Parry
- TV announcers (CBS): Ian Eagle, Dan Fouts and Evan Washburn
- Recap, Gamebook

Game information

**First quarter**

- CIN – Jeremy Hill 3-yard run (Mike Nugent kick), 11:07. Bengals 7–0. **Drive: 5 plays, 74 yards, 2:50.**
- DEN – Brandon McManus 20-yard field goal, 4:05. Bengals 7–3. **Drive: 14 plays, 73 yards, 7:02.**

**Second quarter**

- DEN – Emmanuel Sanders 41-yard pass from Trevor Siemian (Brandon McManus kick), 13:57. Broncos 10–7. **Drive: 3 plays, 46 yards, 1:03.**
- CIN – Jeremy Hill 4-yard run (Mike Nugent kick), 4:57. Bengals 14–10. **Drive: 8 plays, 62 yards, 3:36.**
- DEN – Emmanuel Sanders 7-yard pass from Trevor Siemian (kick blocked), 0:28. Broncos 16–14. **Drive: 10 plays, 55 yards, 4:29.**

**Third quarter**

- No scoring plays

**Fourth quarter**

- CIN – Mike Nugent 34-yard field goal, 14:52. Bengals 17–16. **Drive: 15 plays, 60 yards, 8:18.**
- DEN – John Phillips 1-yard pass from Trevor Siemian (run failed), 6:56. Broncos 22–17. **Drive: 13 plays, 82 yards, 7:56.**
- DEN – Demaryius Thomas 55-yard pass from Trevor Siemian (Brandon McManus kick), 4:24. Broncos 29–17. **Drive: 4 plays, 83 yards, 1:39.**

**Top passers**

- DEN – Trevor Siemian – 23/35, 312 yards, 4 TD
- CIN – Andy Dalton – 21/31, 206 yards, INT

**Top rushers**

- DEN – C. J. Anderson – 14 rushes, 37 yards
- CIN – Jeremy Hill – 17 rushes, 97 yards, 2 TD

**Top receivers**

- DEN – Emmanuel Sanders – 9 receptions, 117 yards, 2 TD
- CIN – A. J. Green – 8 receptions, 77 yards

The Bengals grabbed the lead on their opening possession, with running back Jeremy Hill rushing for a 3-yard touchdown. The Broncos drove down to near the goal line on their second possession, which was aided by two Bengals' defensive penalties, however, the Broncos were forced to settle for a 20-yard field goal by placekicker Brandon McManus. Following a Bengals' fumble on a punt return near midfield, the Broncos took the lead, with quarterback Trevor Siemian connecting on a 41-yard touchdown pass to wide receiver Emmanuel Sanders. Following an exchange of punts, the Bengals went back ahead, with Hill rushing for his second touchdown from 4 yards out. The Broncos responded, with Siemian throwing another touchdown pass to Sanders from 7 yards out. However, the extra point attempt was blocked. Following a scoreless third quarter, a 34-yard field goal by placekicker Mike Nugent gave the Bengals a 17–16 lead early in the fourth quarter. The Broncos then assembled a 13-play, 82-yard drive, culminating with Siemian firing a 1-yard touchdown pass to tight end John Phillips (with an unsuccessful two-point conversion attempt). After the Bengals went three-and-out on their next possession, in which wide receiver A. J. Green dropped a critical third-down pass play, the Broncos added to their lead, with Siemian throwing his fourth touchdown of the game—a 55-yarder to wide receiver Demaryius Thomas with 4:32 remaining in the game. The Broncos' defense stood their ground on the Bengals' last two possessions.

Notes

Trevor Siemian became the first quarterback in NFL history to throw for 300 yards and four touchdowns without an interception in a first career road start. With linebacker Shane Ray recording three sacks, this was the first time in franchise history in which the Broncos had two different players record 3+ sacks in a single game; linebacker Von Miller achieved three sacks vs. the Indianapolis Colts during the previous week.

==== Week 4: at Tampa Bay Buccaneers ====
Week Four: Denver Broncos at Tampa Bay Buccaneers – Game summary

Quarter	1	2	3	4	Total
**Broncos**	7	10	3	7	**27**
Buccaneers	7	0	0	0	**7**

at Raymond James Stadium, Tampa, Florida

- Date: October 2
- Game time: 4:05 pm. EDT/2:05 pm. MDT
- Game weather: 88 °F (31 °C), cloudy
- Game attendance: 60,375
- Referee: Jerome Boger
- TV announcers (CBS): Spero Dedes and Solomon Wilcots
- Recap, Gamebook

Game information

**First quarter**

- DEN – Demaryius Thomas 11-yard pass from Trevor Siemian (Brandon McManus kick), 13:26. Broncos 7–0. **Drive: 1 play, 11 yards, 0:05.**
- TB – Jameis Winston 7-yard run (Roberto Aguayo kick), 6:40. Tied 7–7. **Drive: 13 plays, 75 yards, 6:46.**

**Second quarter**

- DEN – C. J. Anderson 1-yard run (Brandon McManus kick), 12:14. Broncos 14–7. **Drive: 2 plays, 27 yards, 0:56.**
- DEN – Brandon McManus 38-yard field goal, 0:05. Broncos 17–7. **Drive: 9 plays, 47 yards, 1:14.**

**Third quarter**

- DEN – Brandon McManus 24-yard field goal, 7:04. Broncos 20–7. **Drive: 16 plays, 69 yards, 7:57.**

**Fourth quarter**

- DEN – Emmanuel Sanders 5-yard pass from Paxton Lynch (Brandon McManus kick), 8:55. Broncos 27–7. **Drive: 9 plays, 80 yards, 4:39.**

**Top passers**

- DEN – Paxton Lynch – 14/24, 170 yards, TD
- TB – Jameis Winston – 17/35, 179 yards, 2 INT

**Top rushers**

- DEN – C. J. Anderson – 19 rushes, 49 yards, TD
- TB – Charles Sims – 15 rushes, 28 yards

**Top receivers**

- DEN – Demaryius Thomas – 6 receptions, 94 yards, TD
- TB – Cameron Brate – 5 receptions, 67 yards

The Broncos made their first visit to Tampa Bay since 2004. Cornerback Aqib Talib, who made his return to Tampa Bay where he played for the Buccaneers from 2008 to 2012, intercepted Buccaneers' quarterback Jameis Winston on the third play of the opening drive. The Broncos immediately capitalized, with quarterback Trevor Siemian throwing an 11-yard touchdown to wide receiver Demaryius Thomas. On the Buccaneers' next drive, a 7-yard touchdown run by Winston tied the game, which would be the Buccaneers' only scoring play of the game. Following another interception of Winston by Talib, the Broncos re-claimed the lead, with a 1-yard touchdown run by running back C. J. Anderson. With 3:25 remaining in the first half, Siemian injured his non-throwing shoulder when he was sacked by defensive tackle Clinton McDonald, and backup quarterback Paxton Lynch, the team's first-round draft selection, took over in his NFL debut. Placekicker Brandon McManus added two field goals—a 38-yarder just before halftime and a 24-yarder midway through the third quarter. Lynch later threw his first touchdown pass—a 5-yarder to wide receiver Emmanuel Sanders—which put the game out of reach. At the 6:52 mark of the fourth quarter, the game was delayed for an hour and a half due to a severe weather threat in the Tampa area.

==== Week 5: vs. Atlanta Falcons ====
Week Five: Atlanta Falcons at Denver Broncos – Game summary

Quarter	1	2	3	4	Total
**Falcons**	10	3	7	3	**23**
Broncos	0	3	0	13	**16**

at Sports Authority Field at Mile High, Denver, Colorado

- Date: October 9
- Game time: 2:05 pm. MDT
- Game weather: 72 °F (22 °C), mostly cloudy
- Game attendance: 76,802
- Referee: Terry McAulay
- TV announcers (Fox): Chris Myers, John Lynch and Pam Oliver
- Recap, Gamebook

Game information

**First quarter**

- ATL – Devonta Freeman 1-yard run (Matt Bryant kick), 11:18. Falcons 7–0. **Drive: 9 plays, 75 yards, 3:42.**
- ATL – Matt Bryant 46-yard field goal, 4:23. Falcons 10–0. **Drive: 8 plays, 44 yards, 4:23.**

**Second quarter**

- DEN – Brandon McManus 35-yard field goal, 11:39. Falcons 10–3. **Drive: 10 plays, 40 yards, 3:54.**
- ATL – Matt Bryant 33-yard field goal, 1:48. Falcons 13–3. **Drive: 17 plays, 77 yards, 7:00.**

**Third quarter**

- ATL – Tevin Coleman 31-yard pass from Matt Ryan (Matt Bryant kick), 7:53. Falcons 20–3. **Drive: 3 plays, 42 yards, 2:01.**

**Fourth quarter**

- DEN – Brandon McManus 46-yard field goal, 11:01. Falcons 20–6. **Drive: 8 plays, 22 yards, 3:59.**
- ATL – Matt Bryant 25-yard field goal, 8:20. Falcons 23–6. **Drive: 6 plays, 68 yards, 2:41.**
- DEN – Demaryius Thomas 3-yard pass from Paxton Lynch (Brandon McManus kick), 2:38. Falcons 23–13. **Drive: 16 plays, 78 yards, 5:42.**
- DEN – Brandon McManus 45-yard field goal, 0:14. Falcons 23–16. **Drive: 7 plays, 44 yards, 1:42.**

**Top passers**

- ATL – Matt Ryan – 15/28, 267 yards, TD
- DEN – Paxton Lynch – 23/35, 223 yards, TD, INT

**Top rushers**

- ATL – Devonta Freeman – 23 rushes, 88 yards, TD
- DEN – C. J. Anderson – 11 rushes, 41 yards

**Top receivers**

- ATL – Tevin Coleman – 4 receptions, 132 yards, TD
- DEN – Emmanuel Sanders – 7 receptions, 80 yards

The Falcons, making their first visit to Denver since 2004, took a 10–0 lead in the first quarter, with running back Devonta Freeman rushing for a 1-yard touchdown, followed by a 46-yard field goal by placekicker Matt Bryant. The Broncos, with quarterback Paxton Lynch, playing in place of the injured Trevor Siemian, punted on their first two possessions, and got on the scoreboard early in the second quarter, with a 35-yard field goal by placekicker Brandon McManus. Following an exchange of punts, a 33-yard field goal by Bryant just after the two-minute warning extended the Falcons' lead, in a drive that took seven minutes off the clock. In the third quarter, Lynch was intercepted by Falcons' safety Ricardo Allen at the Broncos' 42-yard line, and the Falcons capitalized, with quarterback Matt Ryan connecting on a 31-yard touchdown pass to running back Tevin Coleman to extend to a 20–3 lead. On the Falcons' next drive, Broncos' safety T. J. Ward forced a fumble off wide receiver Mohamed Sanu at midfield, though the Broncos had to settle for a 46-yard field goal by McManus early in the fourth quarter. The Falcons responded, with a 25-yard field goal by McManus to extend to a 23–6 lead with 8:24 remaining in the game. Hoping for a rally, the Broncos went on a 16-play, 78-yard drive, culminating in a 3-yard touchdown pass from Lynch to wide receiver Demaryius Thomas with 2:43 remaining. After an unsuccessful onside kick attempt, the Broncos' defense forced a three-and-out, but were forced to use all of their team timeouts prior to the two-minute warning. The Broncos advanced 44 yards in 7 plays, and pulled to within a 23–16 deficit, with a 45-yard field goal by McManus with only 19 seconds remaining. However, another onside kick attempt was unsuccessful, sealing the win for the Falcons.

Notes

Demaryius Thomas became the third player in Broncos' franchise history to achieve 50 career touchdowns; the other two are Shannon Sharpe (55) and Rod Smith (68).

==== Week 6: at San Diego Chargers ====
Week Six: Denver Broncos at San Diego Chargers – Game summary

Quarter	1	2	3	4	Total
Broncos	0	3	0	10	**13**
**Chargers**	7	3	9	2	**21**

at Qualcomm Stadium, San Diego, California

- Date: October 13
- Game time: 6:25 pm. MDT/5:25 p.m. PDT
- Game weather: 70 °F (21 °C), fair
- Game attendance: 58,904
- Referee: Craig Wrolstad
- TV announcers (CBS/NFLN/Twitter): Jim Nantz, Phil Simms and Tracy Wolfson
- Recap, Gamebook

Game information

**First quarter**

- SD – Hunter Henry 5-yard pass from Philip Rivers (Josh Lambo kick), 8:00. Chargers 7–0. **Drive: 12 plays, 75 yards, 7:00.**

**Second quarter**

- SD – Josh Lambo 37-yard field goal, 10:35. Chargers 10–0. **Drive: 18 plays, 75 yards, 10:03.**
- DEN – Brandon McManus 29-yard field goal, 5:40. Chargers 10–3. **Drive: 4 plays, 0 yards, 2:08.**

**Third quarter**

- SD – Josh Lambo 21-yard field goal, 10:41. Chargers 13–3. **Drive: 5 plays, 51 yards, 2:10.**
- SD – Josh Lambo 31-yard field goal, 7:15. Chargers 16–3. **Drive: 4 plays, 7 yards, 2:00.**
- SD – Josh Lambo 32-yard field goal, 3:31. Chargers 19–3. **Drive: 8 plays, 50 yards, 2:51.**

**Fourth quarter**

- SD – Penalty on Russell Okung enforced in the end zone for a safety 11:59. Chargers 21–3.
- DEN – Bennie Fowler 5-yard pass from Trevor Siemian (Brandon McManus kick), 8:08. Chargers 21–10. **Drive: 11 plays, 51 yards, 3:51.**
- DEN – Brandon McManus 46-yard field goal, 0:27. Chargers 21–13. **Drive: 11 plays, 56 yards, 2:36.**

**Top passers**

- DEN – Trevor Siemian – 30/50, 230 yards, TD
- SD – Philip Rivers – 18/29, 178 yards, TD

**Top rushers**

- DEN – Devontae Booker – 5 rushes, 46 yards
- SD – Melvin Gordon – 27 rushes, 94 yards

**Top receivers**

- DEN – Emmanuel Sanders – 4 receptions, 40 yards
- SD – Hunter Henry – 6 receptions, 83 yards, TD

The Chargers scored took a 10–0 lead, with quarterback Philip Rivers connecting on a 5-yard touchdown pass to tight end Hunter Henry, followed in the second quarter by a 37-yard field goal by placekicker Josh Lambo. Chargers' return specialist Travis Benjamin fumbled a punt return at the Chargers' 11-yard line, however, the Broncos did not gain any yardage, and were forced to settle for a 29-yard field goal by placekicker Brandon McManus. Three third-quarter field goals by Lambo—from 21, 31 and 32 yards out—added to the Chargers' lead. The middle score occurred after a fumble by Broncos' wide receiver Jordan Taylor. McManus missed wide-right on a 56-yard field goal at the end of the third quarter. Early in the fourth quarter, the Broncos' defense forced a Chargers' punt that backed up the Broncos to their own 3-yard line.

On the next play from scrimmage, Broncos' offensive tackle Russell Okung was penalized for holding in the end zone that resulted in a safety, extending the Chargers' lead to 21–3. On the ensuing free kick, the Chargers committed another special teams turnover, with guard Kenny Wiggins fumbling the kick near midfield. The Broncos capitalized on this turnover, with a 5-yard touchdown pass from quarterback Trevor Siemian to wide receiver Bennie Fowler. The Broncos' defense forced a three-and-out on the Chargers' next possession with six minutes remaining in the game. On the sixth play of the Broncos' next drive, Siemian connected with running back C. J. Anderson on a 20-yard touchdown, however, another costly holding penalty on Okung negated the scoring play. Two plays later, Siemian connected on a pass completion to wide receiver Demaryius Thomas to the Chargers' 13-yard line, however, Chargers' linebacker Jatavis Brown forced a fumble off Thomas, which was recovered by cornerback Craig Mager, ending the drive with 3:35 remaining. The Broncos' defense forced another three-and-out, but used all three of their team timeouts in the process. A 46-yard field goal by McManus with 32 seconds remaining pulled the Broncos to within a 21–13 deficit. The Broncos recovered the onside kick at their own 46-yard line, however, four plays later, a desperation hail mary pass by Siemian fell short of the end zone.

Notes

Special teams coordinator Joe DeCamillis served as interim head coach, while Gary Kubiak recovered from a migraine condition that he suffered during the previous week. As part of the NFL Color Rush program, the Broncos wore all-orange throwback uniforms. With the loss, the Broncos' NFL-record 15-game road winning streak against division opponents came to an end. This was the Broncos' final game in San Diego, as the Chargers relocated to Los Angeles after the 2016 season.

==== Week 7: vs. Houston Texans ====
Week Seven: Houston Texans at Denver Broncos – Game summary

Quarter	1	2	3	4	Total
Texans	6	0	3	0	**9**
**Broncos**	0	14	7	6	**27**

at Sports Authority Field at Mile High, Denver, Colorado

- Date: October 24
- Game time: 6:30 pm. MDT
- Game weather: 71 °F (22 °C), partly cloudy
- Game attendance: 76,865
- Referee: Carl Cheffers
- TV announcers (ESPN): Sean McDonough, Jon Gruden and Lisa Salters
- Recap, Gamebook

Game information

**First quarter**

- HOU – Nick Novak 43-yard field goal, 7:11. Texans 3–0. **Drive: 7 plays, 33 yards, 2:16.**
- HOU – Nick Novak 43-yard field goal, 0:21. Texans 6–0. **Drive: 10 plays, 39 yards, 5:05.**

**Second quarter**

- DEN – C. J. Anderson 7-yard run (Brandon McManus kick), 9:10. Broncos 7–6. **Drive: 10 plays, 75 yards, 6:11.**
- DEN – Demaryius Thomas 4-yard pass from Trevor Siemian (Brandon McManus kick), 4:04. Broncos 14–6. **Drive: 7 plays, 68 yards, 3:25.**

**Third quarter**

- HOU – Nick Novak 29-yard field goal, 9:09. Broncos 14–9. **Drive: 9 plays, 72 yards, 4:50.**
- DEN – Devontae Booker 1-yard run (Brandon McManus kick), 0:40. Broncos 21–9. **Drive: 7 plays, 72 yards, 3:57.**

**Fourth quarter**

- DEN – Brandon McManus 22-yard field goal, 11:36. Broncos 24–9. **Drive: 7 plays, 22 yards, 3:20.**
- DEN – Brandon McManus 32-yard field goal, 1:57. Broncos 27–9. **Drive: 7 plays, 20 yards, 2:43.**

**Top passers**

- HOU – Brock Osweiler – 22/41, 131 yards
- DEN – Trevor Siemian – 14/25, 157 yards, TD

**Top rushers**

- HOU – Alfred Blue – 11 rushes, 63 yards
- DEN – C. J. Anderson – 16 rushes, 107 yards, TD

**Top receivers**

- HOU – DeAndre Hopkins – 5 receptions, 36 yards
- DEN – Emmanuel Sanders – 4 receptions, 86 yards

The Broncos' defense surrendered only three field goals by Texans' placekicker Nick Novak, and spoiled quarterback Brock Osweiler's return to Denver, allowing only 131 passing yards. Osweiler spent the previous four seasons (2012–2015) as Peyton Manning's backup quarterback, and started seven games in 2015 while Manning was injured. The Broncos scored three offensive touchdowns: a 4-yard pass from quarterback Trevor Siemian to Demaryius Thomas, plus two rushing touchdowns, one from C. J. Anderson, and the other from rookie Devontae Booker. Placekicker Brandon McManus also added two field goals.

Notes

This was the first of two games in which the Broncos wore their alternate navy blue uniforms – the other was Week 15 vs. the New England Patriots. This was Broncos' head coach Gary Kubiak's first victory against the Texans, for whom he coached from 2006 to 2013, as well as Kubiak's return to the sideline following a health scare that forced him to miss the team's Week 6 loss to the San Diego Chargers.

During halftime, three former Broncos were inducted into the Ring of Fame: Placekicker Jason Elam, who played with the Broncos from 1993 to 2007 and is the franchise's all-time leader in field goals (395) and points scored (1,786); defensive lineman Simon Fletcher, who played with the Broncos from 1985 to 1995 and is the franchise's all-time leader in sacks (97.5) and consecutive games played (172); safety John Lynch, who played four seasons with the Broncos from 2004 to 2007.

==== Week 8: vs. San Diego Chargers ====
Week Eight: San Diego Chargers at Denver Broncos – Game summary

Quarter	1	2	3	4	Total
Chargers	7	0	6	6	**19**
**Broncos**	3	7	7	10	**27**

at Sports Authority Field at Mile High, Denver, Colorado

- Date: October 30
- Game time: 2:05 pm. MDT
- Game weather: 76 °F (24 °C), partly cloudy
- Game attendance: 76,756
- Referee: Tony Corrente
- TV announcers (CBS): Greg Gumbel, Trent Green and Jamie Erdahl
- Recap, Gamebook

Game information

**First quarter**

- DEN – Brandon McManus 28-yard field goal, 11:05. Broncos 3–0. **Drive: 9 plays, 65 yards, 3:55.**
- SD – Antonio Gates 7-yard pass from Philip Rivers (Josh Lambo kick), 7:24. Chargers 7–3. **Drive: 7 plays, 85 yards, 3:41.**

**Second quarter**

- DEN – Bradley Roby 49-yard interception return (Brandon McManus kick), 9:10. Broncos 10–7.

**Third quarter**

- DEN – Devontae Booker 3-yard run (Brandon McManus kick), 12:45. Broncos 17–7. **Drive: 2 plays, 10 yards, 0:45.**
- SD – Travis Benjamin 14-yard pass from Philip Rivers (kick blocked), 4:02. Broncos 17–13. **Drive: 13 plays, 98 yards, 7:42.**

**Fourth quarter**

- DEN – Juwan Thompson 1-yard run (Brandon McManus kick), 12:32. Broncos 24–13. **Drive: 13 plays, 75 yards, 6:30.**
- SD – Casey Hayward 24-yard interception return (pass failed), 8:02. Broncos 24–19.
- DEN – Brandon McManus 22-yard field goal, 5:19. Broncos 27–19. **Drive: 6 plays, 71 yards, 2:43.**

**Top passers**

- SD – Philip Rivers – 20/47, 267 yards, 2 TD, 3 INT
- DEN – Trevor Siemian – 20/38, 276 yards, INT

**Top rushers**

- SD – Melvin Gordon – 23 rushes, 111 yards
- DEN – Devontae Booker – 19 rushes, 54 yards, TD

**Top receivers**

- SD – Dontrelle Inman – 4 receptions, 72 yards
- DEN – Demaryius Thomas – 5 receptions, 79 yards

For the second time in a three-week span, the Broncos faced their AFC West rivals, the San Diego Chargers. Following a 28-yard field goal by placekicker Brandon McManus on the Broncos' opening possession, a 7-yard touchdown pass from quarterback Philip Rivers to tight end Antonio Gates gave the Chargers their only lead of the game. The Broncos' defense then proceeded to frustrate the Chargers' offense, including three interceptions of Rivers. In the second quarter, Broncos' cornerback Bradley Roby returned an interception 49 yards for a touchdown, and Chargers' placekicker Josh Lambo later missed on a 44-yard field goal attempt. On the Chargers' opening possession of the second half, the Broncos took advantage of a Rivers' interception deep in Chargers' territory, and added to their lead, with running back Devontae Booker rushing for a 3-yard touchdown. Rivers subsequently threw another interception deep in Chargers' territory, his third of the game; however, a fumble by Booker gave the football back to the Chargers. Thirteen plays and 98 yards later, the Chargers narrowed the Broncos' lead, with a 14-yard touchdown pass from Rivers to wide receiver Travis Benjamin. Broncos' linebacker Shaquil Barrett blocked the extra point attempt, keeping the score at 17–13.

The Broncos responded early in the fourth quarter, with running back Juwan Thompson rushing for a 1-yard touchdown. On the Broncos' next possession, quarterback Trevor Siemian was intercepted by Chargers' cornerback Casey Hayward, who returned the football 16 yards for a touchdown. The initial two-point conversion pass from Rivers to Gates was successful, however, it was nullified by an offensive pass interference penalty on Gates. Rivers' second attempt intended for tight end Hunter Henry was incomplete, keeping the score at 24–19 with 8:10 remaining in the game. Two long pass plays from Siemian—one to tight end Virgil Green for 31 yards and another to wide receiver Demaryius Thomas for 40 yards—gave the Broncos a first-and-goal at the 4-yard line. However, the Chargers' defense forced the Broncos to settle for a 22-yard field goal by McManus. The Chargers attempted a rally, and with 2:54 remaining, the Chargers had a first-and-goal at the 2-yard line, but Rivers threw four consecutive incompletions, the last of which was knocked away by Broncos' cornerback Lorenzo Doss at the goal line. While backed up deep in their own territory, the Broncos' offense went three-and-out, and were forced to punt, giving the Chargers one last possession. The Broncos' defense stood their ground, not allowing the Chargers to advance past midfield.

Notes

Broncos' defensive coordinator Wade Phillips was rushed to a Denver-area hospital, following a second-quarter sideline collision after Chargers' running back Melvin Gordon was blocked into him. Linebackers coach Reggie Herring filled in for Phillips for the remainder of the game. This was the Broncos' final game against the San Diego Chargers—home or away—prior to the Chargers' relocation to Los Angeles in 2017.

==== Week 9: at Oakland Raiders ====
Week Nine: Denver Broncos at Oakland Raiders – Game summary

Quarter	1	2	3	4	Total
Broncos	0	10	0	10	**20**
**Raiders**	6	14	0	10	**30**

at Oakland Alameda Coliseum, Oakland, California

- Date: November 6
- Game time: 6:30 pm. MST/5:30 pm. PST
- Game weather: 65 °F (18 °C), partly cloudy
- Game attendance: 54,957
- Referee: Clete Blakeman
- TV announcers (NBC): Al Michaels, Cris Collinsworth and Michele Tafoya
- Recap, Gamebook

Game information

**First quarter**

- OAK – Sebastian Janikowski 24-yard field goal, 10:21. Raiders 3–0. **Drive: 8 plays, 47 yards, 4:12.**
- OAK – Sebastian Janikowski 29-yard field goal, 4:52. Raiders 6–0. **Drive: 9 plays, 47 yards, 4:27.**

**Second quarter**

- OAK – Latavius Murray 1-yard run (Sebastian Janikowski kick), 14:07. Raiders 13–0. **Drive: 9 plays, 57 yards, 4:28.**
- DEN – Jordan Norwood 36-yard pass from Trevor Siemian (Brandon McManus kick), 8:22. Raiders 13–7. **Drive: 7 plays, 84 yards, 3:31.**
- OAK – Latavius Murray 1-yard run (Sebastian Janikowski kick), 1:25. Raiders 20–7. **Drive: 6 plays, 75 yards, 1:39.**
- DEN – Brandon McManus 55-yard field goal, 0:00. Raiders 20–10. **Drive: 7 plays, 43 yards, 1:25.**

**Third quarter**

- No scoring plays

**Fourth quarter**

- DEN – Brandon McManus 44-yard field goal, 14:56. Raiders 20–13. **Drive: 11 plays, 73 yards, 4:38.**
- OAK – Sebastian Janikowski 35-yard field goal, 8:19. Raiders 23–13. **Drive: 10 plays, 58 yards, 6:37.**
- OAK – Latavius Murray 1-yard run (Sebastian Janikowski kick), 6:09. Raiders 30–13. **Drive: 4 plays, 39 yards, 1:04.**
- DEN – Kapri Bibbs 69-yard pass from Trevor Siemian (Brandon McManus kick), 5:18. Raiders 30–20. **Drive: 2 plays, 75 yards, 0:51.**

**Top passers**

- DEN – Trevor Siemian – 18/37, 283 yards, 2 TD, INT
- OAK – Derek Carr – 20/31, 184 yards

**Top rushers**

- DEN – Devontae Booker – 10 rushes, 22 yards
- OAK – Latavius Murray – 20 rushes, 114 yards, 3 TD

**Top receivers**

- DEN – Kapri Bibbs – 1 reception, 69 yards, TD
- OAK – Amari Cooper – 6 receptions, 56 yards

The Raiders dominated the time of possession by a 2–1 margin, and though the Broncos' defense limited Raiders' quarterback Derek Carr to 184 yards passing, running back Latavius Murray amassed 114 rushing yards as well as three touchdowns. The Broncos trailed 23–13 with eight minutes remaining in the game, and attempted a rally, however, quarterback Trevor Siemian was strip-sacked by Raiders' linebacker Khalil Mack, giving the Raiders a short field. A 1-yard touchdown by Murray extended the lead, a drive that was kept alive by one defensive holding and two pass interference penalties on Broncos' cornerback Chris Harris, Jr. On the Broncos' next drive, Siemian connected with running back Kapri Bibbs on a 69-yard touchdown pass to pull to within a 30–20 deficit, but the Broncos got no closer.

==== Week 10: at New Orleans Saints ====
Week Ten: Denver Broncos at New Orleans Saints – Game summary

Quarter	1	2	3	4	Total
**Broncos**	7	3	0	15	**25**
Saints	0	3	14	6	**23**

at Mercedes-Benz Superdome, New Orleans, Louisiana

- Date: November 13
- Game time: 12:00 p.m. CST/11:00 am. MST
- Game weather: Played indoors (dome stadium)
- Game attendance: 73,138
- Referee: Bill Vinovich
- TV announcers (CBS): Jim Nantz, Phil Simms and Tracy Wolfson
- Recap, Gamebook

Game information

**First quarter**

- DEN – Jordan Taylor 14-yard pass from Trevor Siemian (Brandon McManus kick), 5:45. Broncos 7–0. **Drive: 13 plays, 85 yards, 7:15.**

**Second quarter**

- DEN – Brandon McManus 50-yard field goal, 13:42. Broncos 10–0. **Drive: 4 plays, 7 yards, 1:11.**
- NO – Wil Lutz 30-yard field goal, 0:00. Broncos 10–3. **Drive: 5 plays, 50 yards, 0:29.**

**Third quarter**

- NO – Willie Snead 3-yard pass from Drew Brees (Wil Lutz kick), 8:30. Tied 10–10. **Drive: 7 plays, 90 yards, 3:50.**
- NO – Willie Snead 5-yard pass from Drew Brees (Wil Lutz kick), 3:59. Saints 17–10. **Drive: 4 plays, 38 yards, 1:36.**

**Fourth quarter**

- DEN – Demaryius Thomas 2-yard pass from Trevor Siemian (Brandon McManus kick), 9:37. Tied 17–17. **Drive: 7 plays, 27 yards, 3:52.**
- DEN – Brandon McManus 28-yard field goal, 3:23. Broncos 20–17. **Drive: 10 plays, 43 yards, 4:18.**
- DEN – Brandon McManus 37-yard field goal, 2:50. Broncos 23–17. **Drive: 4 plays, 2 yards, 0:18.**
- NO – Brandin Cooks 32-yard pass from Drew Brees, 1:22. Tied 23–23. **Drive: 6 plays, 75 yards, 1:28.**
- DEN – Will Parks defensive two-point conversion, 1:22. Broncos 25–23.

**Top passers**

- DEN – Trevor Siemian – 25/40, 258 yards, 2 TD, 2 INT
- NO – Drew Brees – 21/29, 303 yards, 3 TD, 2 INT

**Top rushers**

- DEN – Devontae Booker – 24 rushes, 76 yards
- NO – Mark Ingram II – 11 plays, 50 yards

**Top receivers**

- DEN – Demaryius Thomas – 8 receptions, 87 yards, TD
- NO – Brandin Cooks – 3 receptions, 98 yards, TD

The Broncos, making their first visit to New Orleans since 2004, jumped out to a 10–0 lead. First, quarterback Trevor Siemian connected with wide receiver Jordan Taylor on a 14-yard touchdown pass. The touchdown was initially ruled as an incomplete pass, but overturned by a replay challenge. Following an interception of Saints' quarterback Drew Brees by cornerback Darian Stewart, placekicker Brandon McManus added a 50-yard field goal early in the second quarter. The Broncos were attempting to add to their lead just before halftime, however Siemian was intercepted by cornerback Sterling Moore, and the Saints quickly advanced 50 yards in only 29 seconds, culminating in a 30-yard field goal by placekicker Wil Lutz. Early in the third quarter, the Saints tied the game, with Brees connecting with wide receiver Willie Snead on a 3-yard touchdown pass. On the Broncos' second possession of the second half, Siemian was intercepted by safety Kenny Vaccaro, and four plays later, another touchdown pass from Brees to Snead from 5 yards out gave the Saints a 17–10 lead.

On the Broncos next drive, McManus missed wide left on a 42-yard field attempt early in the fourth quarter. Two plays into the Saints' next possession, Broncos' cornerback Bradley Roby forced a fumble off wide receiver Michael Thomas, which was recovered by Stewart at the Saints' 27-yard line. Seven plays later, the Broncos tied the game, with a 2-yard touchdown pass from Siemian to wide receiver Demaryius Thomas. After forcing the Saints to go three-and-out, the Broncos drove down the field, but had to settle on a 28-yard field goal by McManus. The Broncos' defense forced another fumble deep in Saints' territory, but had to settle on a 37-yard field goal by McManus with 2:50 remaining in the game, while forcing the Saints to burn the last two of their three team timeouts. The Saints then drove 75 yards in only six plays, culminating in Brees throwing a 32-yard touchdown pass to wide receiver Brandin Cooks to tie the game at 23–23 with 1:30 remaining in the game. However, Lutz's extra point attempt was blocked by Justin Simmons, and Will Parks scooped up the football and ran to the end zone for a defensive two-point conversion. The Saints sideline claimed that Parks may have stepped out of bounds, but the initial ruling on the field was upheld after an instant replay review. The Saints' onside kick attempt was unsuccessful, sealing the controversial win for the Broncos.

Notes

Darian Stewart became the Broncos' first defensive player since Deltha O'Neal in 2001 to record three takeaways in one game.

==== Week 12: vs. Kansas City Chiefs ====
Week Twelve: Kansas City Chiefs at Denver Broncos – Game summary

Quarter	1	2	3	4	OT	Total
**Chiefs**	0	9	7	8	6	**30**
Broncos	0	3	7	14	3	**27**

at Sports Authority Field at Mile High, Denver, Colorado

- Date: November 27
- Game time: 6:30 pm. MST
- Game weather: 44 °F (7 °C), mostly cloudy
- Game attendance: 76,819
- Referee: Pete Morelli
- TV announcers (NBC): Mike Tirico, Cris Collinsworth and Michele Tafoya
- Recap, Gamebook

Game information

**First quarter**

- No scoring plays

**Second quarter**

- KC – Russell Okung tackled in the end zone for a safety, 6:16. Chiefs 2–0.
- KC – Tyreek Hill 86-yard kickoff return (Cairo Santos kick), 6:04. Chiefs 9–0. **Drive: 0 plays, 0 yards, 0:12.**
- DEN – Brandon McManus 33-yard field goal, 1:47. Chiefs 9–3. **Drive: 10 plays, 60 yards, 4:17.**

**Third quarter**

- DEN – Jordan Taylor 6-yard pass from Trevor Siemian (Brandon McManus kick), 8:37. Broncos 10–9. **Drive: 12 plays, 63 yards, 5:20.**
- KC – Tyreek Hill 3-yard run (Cairo Santos kick), 0:30. Chiefs 16–10. **Drive: 12 plays, 75 yards, 7:07.**

**Fourth quarter**

- DEN – Emmanuel Sanders 35-yard pass from Trevor Siemian (Brandon McManus kick), 7:47. Broncos 17–16. **Drive: 4 plays, 88 yards, 1:37.**
- DEN – Bennie Fowler 76-yard pass from Trevor Siemian (Brandon McManus kick), 3:00. Broncos 24–16. **Drive: 6 plays, 96 yards, 2:37.**
- KC – Tyreek Hill 3-yard pass from Alex Smith (Alex Smith–Demetrius Harris pass), 0:12. Tied 24–24. **Drive: 13 plays, 75 yards, 2:48.**

**Overtime**

- DEN – Brandon McManus 44-yard field goal, 8:51. Broncos 27–24. **Drive: 11 plays, 49 yards, 6:09.**
- KC – Cairo Santos 37-yard field goal, 4:19. Tied 27–27. **Drive: 10 plays, 46 yards, 4:32.**
- KC – Cairo Santos 34-yard field goal, 0:02. Chiefs 30–27. **Drive: 4 plays, 32 yards, 1:01.**

**Top passers**

- KC – Alex Smith – 26/44, 220 yards, TD
- DEN – Trevor Siemian – 20/34, 368 yards, 3 TD

**Top rushers**

- KC – Spencer Ware – 17 rushes, 64 yards
- DEN – Devontae Booker – 24 rushes, 79 yards

**Top receivers**

- KC – Travis Kelce – 8 receptions, 101 yards
- DEN – Emmanuel Sanders – 7 receptions, 162 yards, TD

After a scoreless first quarter, the Chiefs took a 9–0 lead midway through the second quarter. After Broncos quarterback Trevor Siemian was strip-sacked near the goal line, offensive tackle Russell Okung was tackled in the end zone trying to recover the fumble and the Chiefs were awarded a safety; running back Tyreek Hill then returned the ensuing free kick 86 yards for a touchdown. A 33-yard field goal by placekicker Brandon McManus just after the two-minute warning put the Broncos on the scoreboard. The Broncos grabbed the lead midway through the third quarter, with a 6-yard touchdown pass from Siemian to wide receiver Jordan Taylor. The Chiefs responded on their next possession, with Hill rushing for a 3-yard touchdown. The drive was extended after the Chiefs accepted an illegal formation penalty on the Broncos that nullified a 35-yard field goal by placekicker Cairo Santos. The Broncos re-claimed the lead midway through the fourth quarter, with a 35-yard touchdown pass from Siemian to wide receiver Emmanuel Sanders. After forcing a Chiefs' punt, the Broncos were attempting to run out the clock after earning a first down with 3:31 remaining in the game. Two plays later, and after the Chiefs had used all of their team timeouts, the Broncos extended their lead to 24–16, with a 76-yard touchdown pass from Siemian to wide receiver Bennie Fowler.

However, the Broncos' defense was unable to keep the Chiefs out of the end zone. Quarterback Alex Smith methodically engineered a game-tying 13-play, 75-yard drive, with a 3-yard touchdown pass to Hill, coupled with a two-point conversion pass to tight end Demetrius Harris. The play was initially ruled down at the 1-yard line with 15 seconds remaining, but overturned by instant replay, sending the game to overtime. The Broncos won the overtime coin toss, and the teams exchanged field goals on their initial possessions: a 44-yarder by Brandon McManus followed by a 37-yarder by Santos. The Broncos' next overtime possession commenced with 4:19 remaining, and drove to as far as the Chiefs' 44-yard line. Instead of a short punt, Broncos' head coach Gary Kubiak elected to send McManus onto the field for a potential game-winning 62-yard field goal, however, McManus attempt was both short and wide left, giving the Chiefs possession at the Broncos' 48-yard line with 1:08 remaining. Four plays later, and with five seconds remaining, Santos kicked the game-winning 34-yard field goal for the Chiefs, which initially caromed off the left upright.

==== Week 13: at Jacksonville Jaguars ====
Week Thirteen: Denver Broncos at Jacksonville Jaguars – Game summary

Quarter	1	2	3	4	Total
**Broncos**	0	10	7	3	**20**
Jaguars	0	3	0	7	**10**

at EverBank Field, Jacksonville, Florida

- Date: December 4
- Game time: 1:00 pm. EST/11:00 am. MST
- Game weather: 70 °F (21 °C), partly cloudy
- Game attendance: 63,075
- Referee: Craig Wrolstad
- TV announcers (CBS): Spero Dedes and Solomon Wilcots
- Recap, Gamebook

Game information

**First quarter**

- No scoring plays

**Second quarter**

- JAX – Jason Myers 47-yard field goal, 11:01. Jaguars 3–0. **Drive: 7 plays, 30 yards, 3:08.**
- DEN – Devontae Booker 6-yard run (Brandon McManus kick), 6:54. Broncos 7–3. **Drive: 8 plays, 75 yards, 4:07.**
- DEN – Brandon McManus 32-yard field goal, 0:01. Broncos 10–3. **Drive: 4 plays, 29 yards, 0:46.**

**Third quarter**

- DEN – Bradley Roby 51-yard interception return (Brandon McManus kick), 7:34. Broncos 17–3.

**Fourth quarter**

- JAX – Blake Bortles 22-yard run (Jason Myers kick), 14:03. Broncos 17–10. **Drive: 12 plays, 70 yards, 5:45.**
- DEN – Brandon McManus 41-yard field goal, 0:29. Broncos 20–10. **Drive: 4 plays, 6 yards, 0:58.**

**Top passers**

- DEN – Paxton Lynch – 12/24, 104 yards
- JAX – Blake Bortles – 19/42, 181 yards, 2 INT

**Top rushers**

- DEN – Kapri Bibbs – 5 rushes, 49 yards
- JAX – T. J. Yeldon – 14 rushes, 55 yards

**Top receivers**

- DEN – Demaryius Thomas – 6 receptions, 61 yards
- JAX – Neal Sterling – 5 receptions, 43 yards

For the second time this season, backup quarterback Paxton Lynch started in place of Trevor Siemian, who missed the game due to a sprained foot. Following a scoreless first quarter, a 47-yard field goal by placekicker Jason Myers gave the Jaguars the brief lead. The Broncos then reeled off 17 unanswered points, with a 6-yard touchdown run by running back Devontae Booker and a 32-yard field goal by placekicker Brandon McManus just before halftime. Then, in the third quarter, cornerback Bradley Roby returned an interception off quarterback Blake Bortles 51 yards for a touchdown. The Jaguars narrowed the Broncos' lead to 17–10 early in the fourth quarter, when Bortles ran for a 22-yard touchdown. Following an exchange of punts throughout the majority of the fourth quarter, the Jaguars were attempting a rally just after the two-minute warning, when Broncos' linebacker Shane Ray forced a strip sack and fumble recovery off Bortles in Jaguars' territory. Four plays later, McManus added a 41-yard field goal with only 33 seconds remaining to put the game out of reach.

==== Week 14: at Tennessee Titans ====
Week Fourteen: Denver Broncos at Tennessee Titans – Game summary

Quarter	1	2	3	4	Total
Broncos	0	0	0	10	**10**
**Titans**	10	3	0	0	**13**

at Nissan Stadium, Nashville, Tennessee

- Date: December 11
- Game time: 12:00 pm. CST/11:00 am. MST
- Game weather: 50 °F (10 °C), sunny
- Game attendance: 68,780
- Referee: John Parry
- TV announcers (CBS): Ian Eagle, Dan Fouts and Evan Washburn
- Recap, Gamebook

Game information

**First quarter**

- TEN – DeMarco Murray 1-yard run (Ryan Succop kick), 7:29. Titans 7–0. **Drive: 11 plays, 70 yards, 6:06.**
- TEN – Ryan Succop 53-yard field goal, 5:48. Titans 10–0. **Drive: 4 plays, 5 yards, 1:00.**

**Second quarter**

- TEN – Ryan Succop 41-yard field goal, 1:27. Titans 13–0. **Drive: 19 plays, 74 yards, 8:04.**

**Third quarter**

- No scoring plays

**Fourth quarter**

- DEN – Emmanuel Sanders 3-yard pass from Trevor Siemian (Brandon McManus kick), 9:58. Titans 13–7. **Drive: 5 plays, 26 yards, 2:36.**
- DEN – Brandon McManus 34-yard field goal, 4:28. Titans 13–10. **Drive: 11 plays, 39 yards, 4:27.**

**Top passers**

- DEN – Trevor Siemian – 35/51, 334 yards, TD
- TEN – Marcus Mariota – 6/20, 88 yards

**Top rushers**

- DEN – Justin Forsett – 6 rushes, 17 yards
- TEN – DeMarco Murray – 21 rushes, 92 yards, TD

**Top receivers**

- DEN – Emmanuel Sanders – 11 receptions, 100 yards
- TEN – Delanie Walker – 2 receptions, 30 yards

The Broncos' defense limited Titans' quarterback Marcus Mariota to only 88 yards passing on 6 of 20 attempts; however, the Titans controlled the first half time of possession by a 2–1 margin and led 10–0 in the first quarter. Running back DeMarco Murray rushed for a 1-yard touchdown and placekicker Ryan Succop kicked a 53-yard field goal; the latter scoring play occurred after the Titans' defense forced a fumble off Broncos' running back Justin Forsett. A 41-yard field goal by Succop just before halftime gave the Titans a 13–0 lead. The Broncos' offense did not cross midfield in the first half. After a scoreless third quarter, the Broncos were attempting to cut into the Titans' lead early in the fourth quarter, but the Titans' defense stopped the Broncos on a 4th-and-goal. After forcing a Titans' punt, the Broncos finally got on the scoreboard with ten minutes remaining in the game, with quarterback Trevor Siemian connecting on a 3-yard touchdown pass to wide receiver Emmanuel Sanders. After forcing a three-and-out from the Titans, the Broncos marched down to as far as the Titans' 16-yard line, but had to settle on a 34-yard field goal by placekicker Brandon McManus to narrow the Titans' lead to 13–10 with 4:33 remaining in the game. After forcing another Titans' punt, the Broncos had one last possession, hoping for a rally. With 1:04 remaining in the game, Siemian completed a pass to tight end A. J. Derby at the 41-yard line, however, Titans' linebacker Avery Williamson forced a fumble off Derby, which was recovered by safety Daimion Stafford to seal the win for the Titans.

==== Week 15: vs. New England Patriots ====
Week Fifteen: New England Patriots at Denver Broncos – Game summary

Quarter	1	2	3	4	Total
**Patriots**	3	7	3	3	**16**
Broncos	3	0	0	0	**3**

at Sports Authority Field at Mile High, Denver, Colorado

- Date: December 18
- Game time: 2:25 pm. MST
- Game weather: 18 °F (−8 °C), sunny
- Game attendance: 76,893
- Referee: Walt Anderson
- TV announcers (CBS): Jim Nantz, Phil Simms and Tracy Wolfson
- Recap, Gamebook

Game information

**First quarter**

- NE – Stephen Gostkowski 45-yard field goal, 12:27. Patriots 3–0. **Drive: 4 plays, 4 yards, 0:49.**
- DEN – Brandon McManus 33-yard field goal, 6:58. Tied 3–3. **Drive: 8 plays, 47 yards, 2:55.**

**Second quarter**

- NE – LeGarrette Blount 1-yard run (Stephen Gostkowski kick), 11:01. Patriots 10–3. **Drive: 7 plays, 46 yards, 3:49.**

**Third quarter**

- NE – Stephen Gostkowski 40-yard field goal, 5:28. Patriots 13–3. **Drive: 11 plays, 61 yards, 5:12.**

**Fourth quarter**

- NE – Stephen Gostkowski 21-yard field goal, 8:16. Patriots 16–3. **Drive: 6 plays, 50 yards, 2:40.**

**Top passers**

- NE – Tom Brady – 16/32, 188 yards
- DEN – Trevor Siemian – 25/40, 282 yards, INT

**Top rushers**

- NE – Dion Lewis – 18 rushes, 95 yards
- DEN – Justin Forsett – 10 rushes, 37 yards

**Top receivers**

- NE – Julian Edelman – 6 receptions, 75 yards
- DEN – Demaryius Thomas – 7 receptions, 91 yards

The Broncos' defense limited Patriots' quarterback Tom Brady to 188 yards passing and no touchdowns, but their defensive effort was wasted by a poor performance from their inconsistent offense. The Broncos' only scoring play was a 33-yard field goal by placekicker Brandon McManus. In the first quarter, a fumbled punt by Jordan Norwood led to a 45-yard field goal by Patriots' placekicker Stephen Gostkowski. An interception off Broncos' quarterback Trevor Siemian by cornerback Logan Ryan resulted in the only touchdown of the game—a 1-yard run by Patriots' running back LeGarrette Blount in the second quarter. Gostkowski added two more field goals—a 40-yarder in the third quarter and a 21-yarder in the fourth.

Notes

The Broncos wore their alternate navy blue uniforms for this game.

==== Week 16: at Kansas City Chiefs ====
NFL on Christmas Day

Week Sixteen: Denver Broncos at Kansas City Chiefs – Game summary

Quarter	1	2	3	4	Total
Broncos	7	3	0	0	**10**
**Chiefs**	21	0	0	12	**33**

at Arrowhead Stadium, Kansas City, Missouri

- Date: December 25
- Game time: 7:30 pm. CST/6:30 pm. MST
- Game weather: 53 °F (12 °C), cloudy, rain
- Game attendance: 76,671
- Referee: Tony Corrente
- TV announcers (NBC): Al Michaels, Cris Collinsworth and Michele Tafoya
- Recap, Gamebook

Game information

**First quarter**

- KC – Alex Smith 10-yard run (Cairo Santos kick), 8:59. Chiefs 7–0. **Drive: 7 plays, 77 yards, 3:51.**
- KC – Tyreek Hill 70-yard run (Cairo Santos kick), 5:17. Chiefs 14–0. **Drive: 4 plays, 81 yards, 2:12.**
- DEN – Justin Forsett 1-yard run (Brandon McManus kick), 1:54. Chiefs 14–7. **Drive: 2 plays, 6 yards, 0:41.**
- KC – Travis Kelce 80-yard pass from Alex Smith (Cairo Santos kick), 0:53. Chiefs 21–7. **Drive: 2 plays, 84 yards, 1:01.**

**Second quarter**

- DEN – Brandon McManus 52-yard field goal, 6:38. Chiefs 21–10. **Drive: 6 plays, 37 yards, 1:47.**

**Third quarter**

- No scoring plays

**Fourth quarter**

- KC – Cairo Santos 27-yard field goal, 11:59. Chiefs 24–10. **Drive: 11 plays, 53 yards, 5:59.**
- KC – Cairo Santos 39-yard field goal, 8:51. Chiefs 27–10. **Drive: 6 plays, 15 yards, 2:58.**
- KC – Demetrius Harris 2-yard pass from Dontari Poe (kick failed, wide left), 1:52. Chiefs 33–10. **Drive: 10 plays, 43 yards, 4:31.**

**Top passers**

- DEN – Trevor Siemian – 17/43, 183 yards, INT
- KC – Alex Smith – 25/36, 244 yards, TD, INT

**Top rushers**

- DEN – Devontae Booker – 5 rushes, 44 yards
- KC – Tyreek Hill – 6 rushes, 95 yards, TD

**Top receivers**

- DEN – Devontae Booker – 6 receptions, 44 yards
- KC – Travis Kelce – 11 receptions, 160 yards, TD

The Chiefs jumped out to a 21–7 lead at the end of the first quarter, consisting of a 10-yard touchdown run by quarterback Alex Smith, followed by Smith throwing a pair of touchdown passes—a 70-yarder to wide receiver Tyreek Hill and an 80-yarder to tight end Travis Kelce. The Broncos' only touchdown of the game was a 1-yard run by running back Justin Forsett, which occurred after a Justin Simmons' interception of Smith. A 52-yard field goal by placekicker Brandon McManus midway through the second quarter was the Broncos' only other scoring play of the game; a fake field goal attempt just before halftime was unsuccessful. After a scoreless third quarter, the Chiefs pulled away in the fourth quarter, with two field goals by placekicker Cairo Santos—from 27 and 39 yards out—and nose tackle Dontari Poe throwing a 1-yard touchdown pass to tight end Demetrius Harris (with a missed extra point). The latter field goal occurred after Broncos' return specialist Kalif Raymond muffed a punt return.

Notes

With the loss, the Broncos were eliminated from playoff contention for the first time since 2010, lost all three of their AFC West divisional road games for the first time since 2010 and suffered their first season sweep at the hands of the Chiefs since 2000. The Broncos' streak of five consecutive playoff appearances—the longest in franchise history—came to an end. For the first time since 1966, the Broncos' offense scored 10 of fewer points for a third consecutive game. The Broncos' defense surrendered 330 yards in the first half—the most the Broncos have surrendered in a half since 1981, and 484 for the entire game—the most since 2013.

This would also be the final career game of outside linebacker DeMarcus Ware, who would have season-ending back surgery the next week.

==== Week 17: vs. Oakland Raiders ====
Week Seventeen: Oakland Raiders at Denver Broncos – Game summary

Quarter	1	2	3	4	Total
Raiders	0	0	6	0	**6**
**Broncos**	7	10	7	0	**24**

at Sports Authority Field at Mile High, Denver, Colorado

- Date: January 1, 2017
- Game time: 2:25 pm. MST
- Game weather: 45 °F (7 °C), mostly cloudy
- Game attendance: 76,836
- Referee: Brad Allen
- TV announcers (CBS): Jim Nantz, Phil Simms and Tracy Wolfson
- Recap, Gamebook

Game information

**First quarter**

- DEN – Devontae Booker 11-yard run (Brandon McManus kick), 10:15. Broncos 7–0. **Drive: 8 plays, 84 yards, 4:45.**

**Second quarter**

- DEN – Brandon McManus 22-yard field goal, 11:30. Broncos 10–0. **Drive: 8 plays, 85 yards, 4:44.**
- DEN – Devontae Booker 43-yard pass from Trevor Siemian (Brandon McManus kick), 1:44. Broncos 17–0. **Drive: 5 plays, 58 yards, 2:24.**

**Third quarter**

- DEN – Virgil Green 2-yard pass from Trevor Siemian (Brandon McManus kick), 8:14. Broncos 24–0. **Drive: 10 plays, 64 yards, 4:46.**
- OAK – Amari Cooper 32-yard pass from Connor Cook (pass failed), 3:09. Broncos 24–6. **Drive: 3 plays, 63 yards, 1:29.**

**Fourth quarter**

- No scoring plays

**Top passers**

- OAK – Connor Cook – 14/21, 150 yards, TD, INT
- DEN – Trevor Siemian – 17/27, 206 yards, 2 TD, INT

**Top rushers**

- OAK – DeAndré Washington – 7 rushes, 43 yards
- DEN – Justin Forsett – 22 rushes, 90 yards

**Top receivers**

- OAK – Michael Crabtree – 5 receptions, 47 yards
- DEN – Devontae Booker – 2 receptions, 52 yards, TD

The Broncos jumped out to a 24–0 lead midway through the third quarter and spoiled the Raiders' chances of earning the AFC West division title and a first-round bye. Running back Devontae Booker scored two touchdowns—an 11-yard run in the first quarter and on a 43-yard pass from quarterback Trevor Siemian, who also connected on a 2-yard touchdown pass to tight end Virgil Green in the third quarter. Placekicker Brandon McManus added a 22-yard field goal in the second quarter. The only scoring play allowed by the Broncos' defense was a 32-yard touchdown pass from Raiders' quarterback Connor Cook to wide receiver Amari Cooper. Cook substituted for starter Matt McGloin, who left the game in the second quarter with a shoulder injury. McGloin was named the Raiders' starting quarterback after Derek Carr suffered a season-ending leg fracture during the previous week.

Notes

This was Gary Kubiak's final game as the Broncos' head coach, as he retired from coaching on the following day due to concerns over his health.

=== Standings ===
==== Division ====
AFC West
	W	L	T	PCT	DIV	CONF	PF	PA	STK
^{(2)} Kansas City Chiefs	12	4	0	.750	6–0	9–3	389	311	W2
^{(5)} Oakland Raiders	12	4	0	.750	3–3	9–3	416	385	L1
Denver Broncos	9	7	0	.563	2–4	6–6	333	297	W1
San Diego Chargers	5	11	0	.313	1–5	4–8	410	423	L5

==== Conference ====
AFC
#	Team	Division	W	L	T	PCT	DIV	CONF	SOS	SOV	STK
**Division leaders**
1	New England Patriots	East	14	2	0	.875	5–1	11–1	.439	.424	W7
2 (Note: Kansas City clinched the AFC West division over Oakland based on head-to-head sweep.)	Kansas City Chiefs	West	12	4	0	.750	6–0	9–3	.508	.479	W2
3	Pittsburgh Steelers	North	11	5	0	.688	5–1	9–3	.494	.423	W7
4 (Note: Houston clinched the AFC South division title over Tennessee based on record vs. division opponents.)	Houston Texans	South	9	7	0	.563	5–1	7–5	.502	.427	L1
**Wild Cards**
5	Oakland Raiders	West	12	4	0	.750	3–3	9–3	.504	.443	L1
6	Miami Dolphins	East	10	6	0	.625	4–2	7–5	.455	.341	L1
**Did not qualify for the postseason**
7 (Note: Tennessee finished ahead of Denver based on head-to-head victory.)	Tennessee Titans	South	9	7	0	.563	2–4	6–6	.465	.458	W1
8	Denver Broncos	West	9	7	0	.563	2–4	6–6	.549	.455	W1
9 (Note: Baltimore finished ahead of Indianapolis based on record vs. conference opponents.)	Baltimore Ravens	North	8	8	0	.500	4–2	7–5	.498	.363	L2
10	Indianapolis Colts	South	8	8	0	.500	3–3	5–7	.492	.406	W1
11	Buffalo Bills	East	7	9	0	.438	1–5	4–8	.482	.339	L2
12	Cincinnati Bengals	North	6	9	1	.406	3–3	5–7	.521	.333	W1
13 (Note: The New York Jets finished ahead of San Diego based record vs. common opponents — the Jets' cumulative record against Cleveland, Indianapolis, Kansas City and Miami was 1–4, while San Diego's cumulative record against the same four teams was 0–5.)	New York Jets	East	5	11	0	.313	2–4	4–8	.518	.313	W1
14	San Diego Chargers	West	5	11	0	.313	1–5	4–8	.543	.513	L5
15	Jacksonville Jaguars	South	3	13	0	.188	2–4	2–10	.527	.417	L1
16	Cleveland Browns	North	1	15	0	.063	0–6	1–11	.549	.313	L1
**Tiebreakers** (Note: When breaking ties for three or more teams under the NFL's rules, they are first broken within divisions, then comparing only the highest ranked remaining team from each division.)

=== Statistics ===
==== Team leaders ====
Category	Player(s)	Value
Passing yards	Trevor Siemian	3,401
Passing touchdowns	Trevor Siemian	18
Rushing yards	Devontae Booker	612
Rushing touchdowns	C. J. Anderson; Devontae Booker	4
Receptions	Demaryius Thomas	90
Receiving yards	Demaryius Thomas	1,083
Receiving touchdowns	Demaryius Thomas; Emmanuel Sanders	5
Points	Brandon McManus	119
Kickoff return yards	Cody Latimer	200
Punt return yards	Jordan Norwood	204
Tackles	Todd Davis	96
Sacks	Von Miller	13.5
Forced fumbles	T. J. Ward; Von Miller	3
Interceptions	Aqib Talib; Darian Stewart	3

Source for this section: Denver Broncos' official website.

==== League rankings ====
Offense
Category	Value	NFL rank (out of 32)
Total yards	323.1 YPG	27th
Yards per play	5.1	26th
Rushing yards	92.8 YPG	27th
Yards per rush	3.6	28th
Passing yards	230.3 YPG	T–21st
Yards per pass	6.9	20th
Total touchdowns	35	T–24th
Rushing touchdowns	11	T–20th
Receiving touchdowns	20	T–21st
Scoring	20.8 PPG	22nd
Pass completions	339/570 (.595)	25th
Third downs	75/219 (.342)	31st
First downs per game	18.1	28th
Possession average	29:03	27th
Fewest sacks allowed	40	24th
Turnover differential	+2	T–13th
Fewest penalties	119	27th
Fewest penalty yardage	985	25th

Defense
Category	Value	NFL rank (out of 32)
Total yards	316.1 YPG	4th
Yards per play	4.7	1st
Rushing yards	130.3 YPG	28th
Yards per rush	4.3	18th
Passing yards	185.8 YPG	1st
Yards per pass	5.8	1st
Total touchdowns	30	3rd
Rushing touchdowns	15	T–18th
Receiving touchdowns	13	1st
Scoring	18.6 PPG	4th
Pass completions	306/552 (.554)	1st
Third downs	86/236 (.364)	5th
First downs per game	19.1	9th
Sacks	42	T–3rd
Forced fumbles	16	T–7th
Fumble recoveries	13	T–4th
Interceptions	14	T–12th
Fewest penalties	110	T–21st
Fewest penalty yardage	990	26th

Special Teams
Category	Value	NFL rank (out of 32)
Kickoff returns	22.9 YPR	11th
Punt returns	8.5 YPR	15th
Gross punting	45.7 YPP	16th
Net punting	41.3 YPP	9th
Kickoff coverage	20.2 YPR	7th
Punt coverage	6.8 YPR	7th

Source for this section: NFL.com.

== Awards and honors ==
Recipient	awards
Von Miller	Week 2: AFC Defensive Player of the Week; September: AFC Defensive Player of the Month
Bradley Roby	Week 8: AFC Defensive Player of the Week
Trevor Siemian	Week 3: AFC Offensive Player of the Week
Justin Simmons	Week 10: AFC Special Teams Player of the Week

=== Pro Bowl and All-Pro selections ===
Three Broncos were selected to the 2017 Pro Bowl: Linebacker Von Miller and cornerbacks Chris Harris, Jr. and Aqib Talib. All three were also voted to the 2016 All-Pro Team and named to the First Team. Safety Darian Stewart and wide receivers Emmanuel Sanders and Demaryius Thomas were later added to the Pro Bowl roster as replacements.

== Other news and notes ==
- August 25: Executive vice president/general manager John Elway was added to the NFL's competition committee.
- September 7: The Broncos and wide receiver Emmanuel Sanders agreed on a three-year contract extension that will keep Sanders in Denver through the 2019 season. The initial three-year contract that Sanders signed with the Broncos in 2014 was set to expire after the 2016 season.
- September 13: The Broncos' Color Rush uniforms were unveiled, which the team wore during their Week 6 Thursday Night loss at the San Diego Chargers. The uniform kit contained the following features: orange pants, which the team wore for the first time since 1979, orange socks and shoes, as well as block-style numerals trimmed in navy blue that mirrored the team's 1968–96 uniform style. Due to the NFL's one-helmet rule implemented in 2013, the helmets remained the same, with the team temporarily replacing the modern primary logo with the throwback "D" horse logo.
- November 26: The Broncos and safety Darian Stewart agreed on a four-year contract extension that will keep Stewart in Denver through the 2020 season. The initial two-year contract that Stewart signed with the Broncos in 2015 was set to expire after the 2016 season.
