= Matt Paradis =

American football player (born 1989)

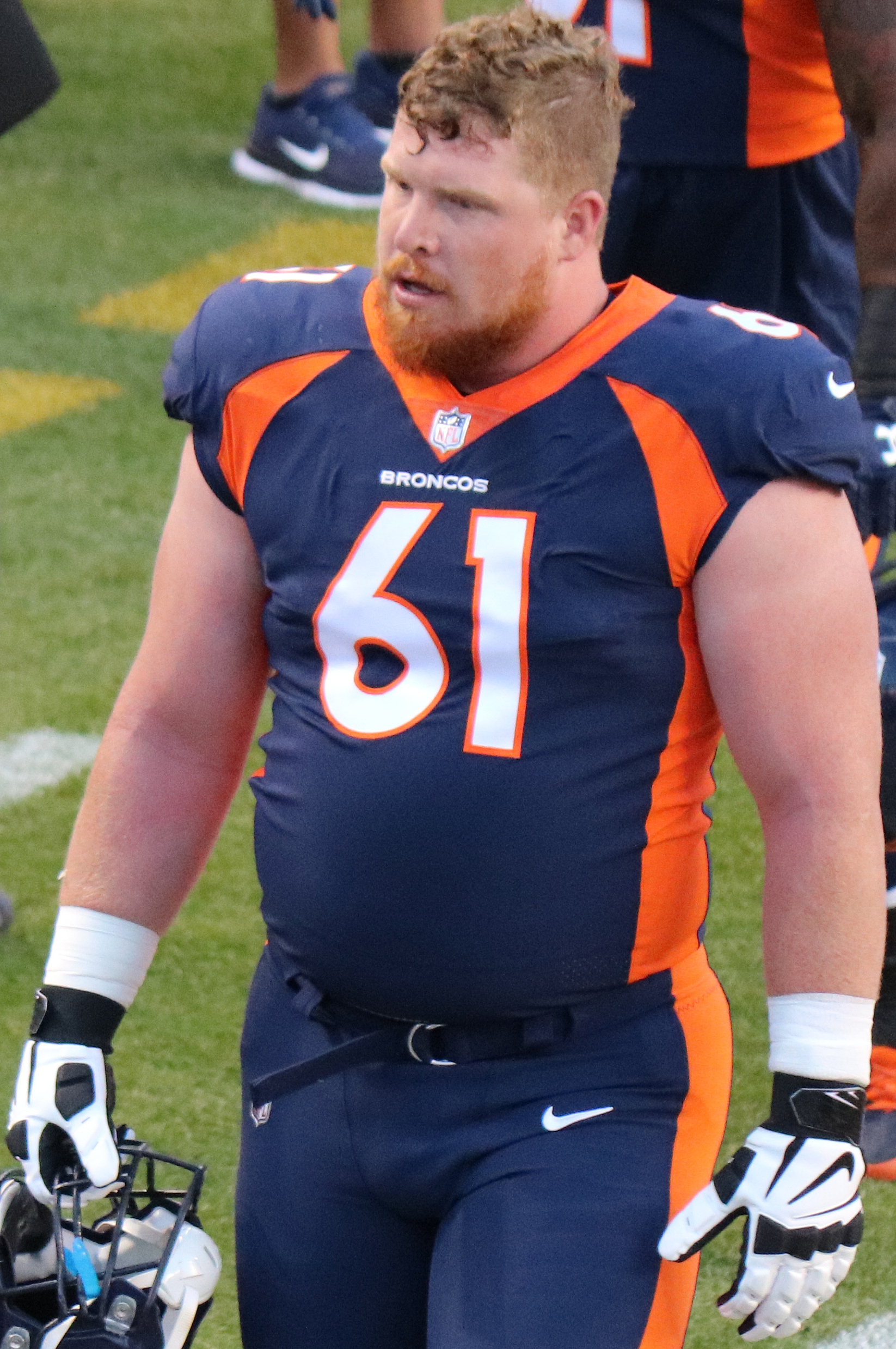
- Paradis with the Denver Broncos in 2017

No. 61
- Position: Center

Personal information
- Born: October 12, 1989 (age 37); Council, Idaho, U.S.
- Listed height: 6 ft 3 in (1.91 m)
- Listed weight: 300 lb (136 kg)

Career information
- High school: Council
- College: Boise State (2009–2013)
- NFL draft: 2014: 6th round, 207th overall pick

Career history
- Denver Broncos (2014–2018); Carolina Panthers (2019–2021)

Awards and highlights
- Super Bowl champion (50)

Career NFL statistics
- Games played: 98
- Games started: 98
- Stats at Pro Football Reference

Matt Paradis (born October 12, 1989) is an American former professional football player who was a center in the National Football League (NFL) for eight seasons. He was selected by the Denver Broncos in the sixth round of the 2014 NFL draft. He played college football for the Boise State Broncos.

== Professional career ==
=== Pre-draft ===
Paradis was one of 51 collegiate offensive linemen to attend the NFL Scouting Combine in Indianapolis, Indiana. He completed all of the combine drills and had a mediocre performance overall, finishing 11th in the three-cone drill and 20th among offensive linemen in the bench press. On March 14, 2014, he attended Boise State's pro day, but opted to stand on his combine numbers and only ran positional drills. At the conclusion of the pre-draft process, Paradis was projected to be a seventh round pick or priority undrafted free agent by NFL draft experts and scouts. He was ranked the 15th best center prospect in the draft by NFLDraftScout.com.

Pre-draft measurables
Height	Weight	Arm length	Hand span	40-yard dash	10-yard split	20-yard split	20-yard shuttle	Three-cone drill	Vertical jump	Broad jump	Bench press
6 ft 2 5/8 in (1.90 m)	306 lb (139 kg)	32 3/8 in (0.82 m)	9 7/8 in (0.25 m)	5.34 s	1.85 s	3.10 s	4.46 s	7.60 s	26 in (0.66 m)	8 ft 7 in (2.62 m)	23 reps
All values from NFL Combine

=== Denver Broncos ===
==== 2014 ====
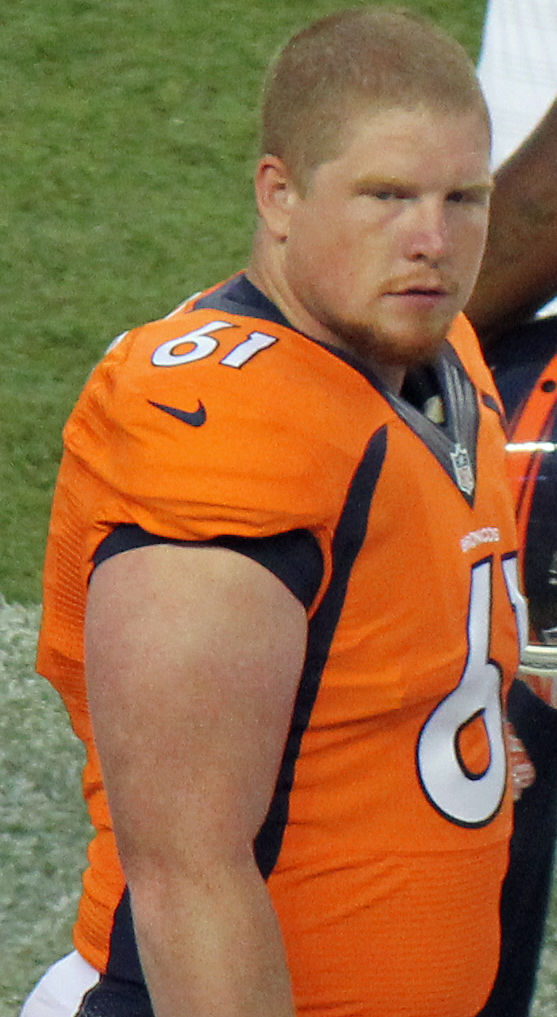
Paradis with the Broncos in 2014

The Denver Broncos selected Paradis in the sixth round (207th overall) of the 2014 NFL draft. He was the ninth center selected in 2014.

On June 2, 2014, the Broncos signed Paradis to a four-year, $2.31 million contract that includes a signing bonus of $91,000.

Throughout training camp, he competed for a roster spot against Will Montgomery. On August 30, 2014, the Denver Broncos waived Paradis and signed him to their practice squad on September 1, 2014. On January 15, 2015, the Denver Broncos signed Paradis to a reserve/future contract.

==== 2015 ====
Throughout training camp, Paradis competed against Gino Gradkowski for the vacant starting center role after Manny Ramirez and Will Montgomery both departed during free agency. Head coach Gary Kubiak named Paradis the starting center to begin the regular season.

He made his first career start and professional regular season debut in the Denver Broncos' season-opening 19–13 victory over the Baltimore Ravens. Paradis started all 16 regular season games and helped the Broncos attain a 12–4 record and finish atop the AFC West. On January 17, 2016, he started his first career playoff game as the Broncos defeated the Pittsburgh Steelers 23–16 in the AFC divisional playoff game. The Denver Broncos went on to defeat the New England Patriots and play against the Carolina Panthers in Super Bowl 50. Paradis started in the Super Bowl and helped his team defeat the Carolina Panthers by a score of 24–10. Paradis played exceptionally well throughout his first season as a starter and was ranked the best center in the NFL in 2015 by Pro Football Focus and was also ranked the fourth overall center by the Bleacher Report. Due to his contract and his snap count, Paradis earned a player performance bonus of $391,647. It was the largest performance bonus of any player in 2015. He allowed 29 quarterback pressures and received a pass blocking efficiency of 96.6 from Pro Football Focus. It ranked 19th among all centers in 2015.

==== 2016 ====
On April 14, 2016, the Denver Broncos signed Paradis to a one-year, $525,000 contract.

After a stellar season in 2016, Paradis maintained his starting role to begin the regular season. He started all 16 regular season games and helped the Broncos finish 9–7. Paradis played 2,392 snaps out of a possible 2,402 snaps in 2016 and only allowed 17 quarterback pressures. Pro Football Focus gave Paradis a pass blocking efficiency of 97.9, which ranked 13th among all centers. He also received an overall grade of 90.7 from PFF that finished first among all centers. The Denver Broncos finished with a 9–7 record and did not qualify for the playoffs. Head coach Gary Kubiak announced his retirement after the season, due to health concerns. As the Broncos' starting center, Paradis received a player performance bonus of $306,002, which was the highest player performance bonus of any player on the Broncos' roster.

==== 2017 ====
On March 7, 2017, the Denver Broncos signed Paradis to his exclusive rights tender under the terms of one-year, $615,000 contract. Due to his exclusive rights tender, he was unable to negotiate with any other team, but became a restricted free agent in 2018.

Paradis missed organized team activities and the beginning of training camp after undergoing arthroscopic surgery on both his hips during the offseason. He returned to training camp after receiving medical clearance in July. Head coach Vance Joseph named Paradis the starting center to begin the regular season, ahead of Connor McGovern and Dillon Day. Paradis started all 16 regular season games for the third consecutive season. He earned an overall grade of 75.2 from Pro Football Focus in 2017.

==== 2018 ====
On March 12, 2018, the Broncos placed a second-round restricted free agent tender on Paradis. He started the first nine games at center before suffering a fractured fibula in Week 9. He was placed on injured reserve on November 12, 2018.

=== Carolina Panthers ===
On March 14, 2019, Paradis signed a three-year, $27 million contract with the Carolina Panthers.

Paradis suffered a torn ACL in Week 9 of the 2021 season and was placed on injured reserve on November 8, 2021.
