= Devontae Booker =

American football player (born 1992)

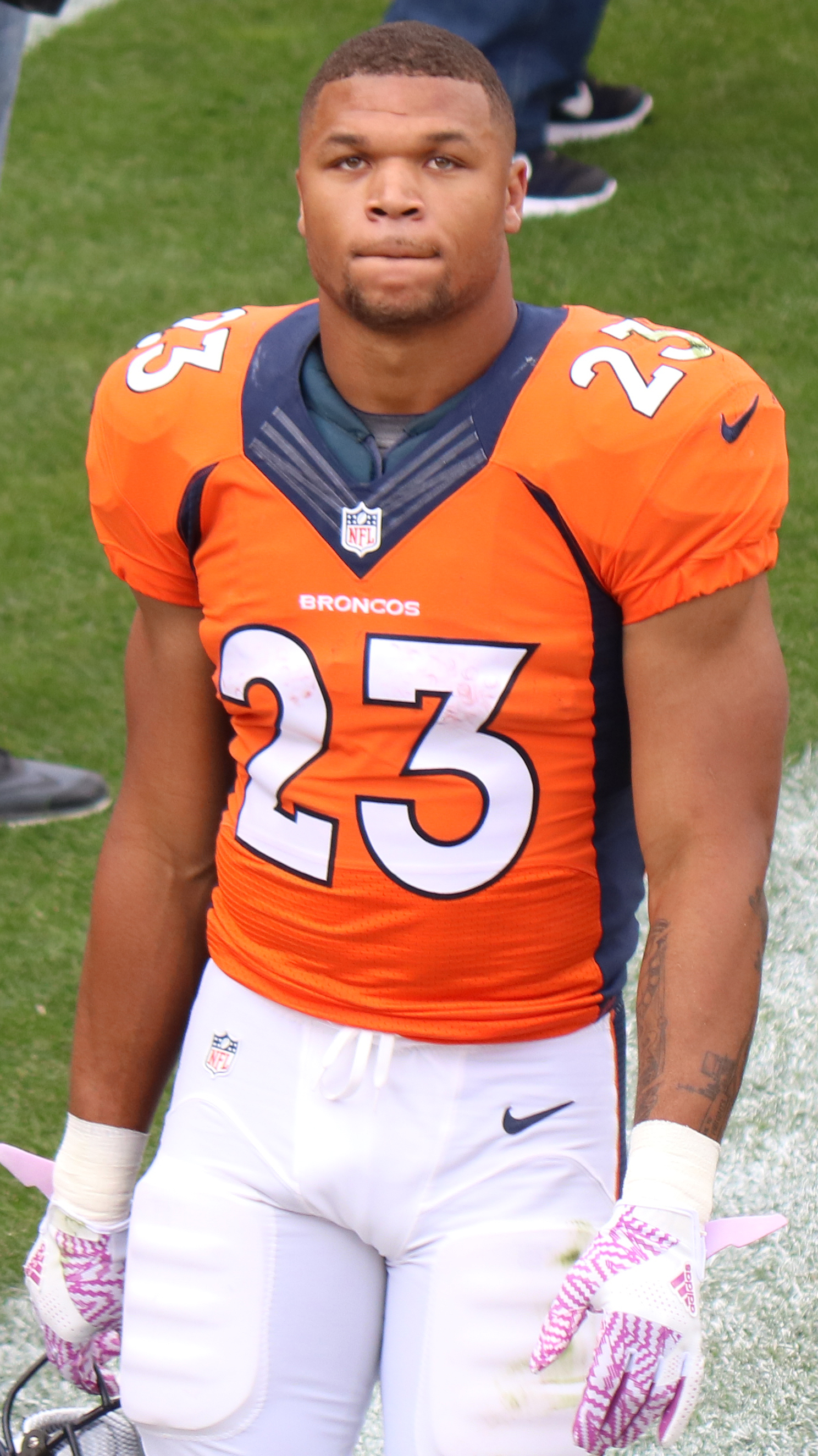
- Booker with the Denver Broncos in 2016

No. 23, 28
- Position: Running back

Personal information
- Born: May 27, 1992 (age 34); Sacramento, California, U.S.
- Listed height: 5 ft 11 in (1.80 m)
- Listed weight: 219 lb (99 kg)

Career information
- High school: Grant Union (Sacramento, California)
- College: American River College (2011–2013); Utah (2014–2015)
- NFL draft: 2016: 4th round, 136th overall pick

Career history
- Denver Broncos (2016–2019); Las Vegas Raiders (2020); New York Giants (2021)

Awards and highlights
- First-team All-Pac-12 (2014); Second-team All-Pac-12 (2015)

Career NFL statistics
- Rushing yards: 2,119
- Rushing average: 4.0
- Rushing touchdowns: 11
- Receptions: 162
- Receiving yards: 1,224
- Receiving touchdowns: 2
- Stats at Pro Football Reference

Devontae Booker (born May 27, 1992) is an American former professional football player who was a running back in the National Football League (NFL). He played college football for the Utah Utes and was selected by the Denver Broncos in the fourth round of the 2016 NFL draft. Booker has also played for the Las Vegas Raiders and New York Giants.

== Early life ==
Booker attended and played high school football for Grant Union High School in Sacramento, California, where he rushed for 2,884 yards and 45 touchdowns as a senior. Booker helped Grant High to the 2008 CIF State Open Division state title as a junior, leading the team in rushing yards (1,850) and touchdowns (36). He was named to the Sacramento Bee's all-metro teams in 2008 and 2009.

== College career ==
Booker originally signed with Washington State University out of high school but was later ruled academically ineligible.

Booker attended American River College from 2011 to 2013.

In 2011, Booker had 793 rushing yards and 12 touchdowns, and in 2012, he had 1,472 yards and 15 touchdowns. Booker was originally expected to transfer to the University of Utah prior to the 2013 season, but was unable due to academic reasons. He stayed at American River College and did not play football in 2013.

Booker officially transferred to Utah in 2014. He entered the season splitting time with Bubba Poole, but eventually became the main running back. Booker started nine of 13 games his junior season, finishing with 292 carries for 1,512 yards and 10 touchdowns to go along with 43 receptions for 306 yards with two touchdowns. He posted the second-most yards (1,512) and third-most carries (292) in school history, earning a first-team All-Pac-12 Conference selection.

Booker opened the first 10 games of 2015 before suffering a season-ending knee injury, finishing with 268 carries for 1,261 yards and 11 touchdowns to go along with 37 receptions for 318 yards. He led the nation with 305 touches from scrimmage (30.5 per game) and carries per game (26.8) at the time of his knee injury. Booker was named a Maxwell Award semifinalist (national player of the year) and Doak Walker Award semifinalist (nation's top running back) in addition to earning All-Pac-12 second-team honor.

== Professional career ==
Pre-draft measurables
Height	Weight	Arm length	Hand span	Bench press	Wonderlic
5 ft 10 3/4 in (1.80 m)	219 lb (99 kg)	31 5/8 in (0.80 m)	8 5/8 in (0.22 m)	22 reps	15
All values from NFL Combine

=== Denver Broncos ===
Booker was drafted by the Denver Broncos in the fourth round with the 136th overall pick in the 2016 NFL draft. He was the seventh running back to be selected that year. Booker opened training camp competing for a roster spot as a reserve player behind veteran starter C. J. Anderson. At the conclusion of the preseason, Booker was named the season as the No. 2 running back behind Anderson.

On his first NFL carry against the Carolina Panthers, Booker fumbled the ball and was recovered by former Grant High School teammate Shaq Thompson. Booker re-entered the game and finished with three carries for eight yards. Booker had his first career touchdown against the Houston Texans on October 24 after Anderson left the game with an injury. After Anderson was lost for the season, Booker became the starting running back the following week against the San Diego Chargers. He was the starter for the Broncos the next five games until the Broncos claimed Justin Forsett off waivers, who started the final three games. Booker finished his rookie year playing in all 16 games with six starts, rushing 174 times for 612 yards and four touchdowns to go along with 31 receptions for 265 yards and a touchdown. Booker became the 13th rookie in team history and first since Knowshon Moreno in 2009 to lead the team in rushing.

Booker remained in the Broncos' backfield in the 2017 season. He appeared in 13 games with no starts, rushing 79 times for 299 yards and a touchdown and catching 30 passes for 275 yards. Booker also added 14 kickoff returns for 276 yards and a 19.7 average.

After the departure of C. J. Anderson, Booker competed for the starting running back gig with third-round rookie Royce Freeman in 2018. Booker was named the second running back behind Freeman at the end of the 2018 preseason. He rushed for 183 yards and a touchdown in the 2018 season while appearing in all 16 games with no starts. In addition, he had 38 receptions for 275 yards.

Booker began the 2019 season as the third running back on the depth chart, behind second-year players Royce Freeman and Phillip Lindsay. He appeared in 15 games, with no starts, and recorded six receptions for 57 receiving yards to go along with two carries for nine rushing yards in the 2019 season.

=== Las Vegas Raiders ===
On May 11, 2020, Booker signed a one-year, veteran's minimum deal with the Las Vegas Raiders. He was placed on the reserve/COVID-19 list by the team on July 30, and activated from the list five days later.

Booker scored his first touchdown as a Raider against the Los Angeles Chargers in a 31–26 victory in Week 9. In the next game against his former team, the Denver Broncos, Booker rushed for 81 yards and two touchdowns during the 37–12 victory. He finished the 2020 season with 93 carries for 423 yards and three touchdowns to go along with 17 receptions for 84 yards.

=== New York Giants ===
On March 19, 2021, Booker signed a two-year contract with the New York Giants. He scored his first touchdown as a Giant against the Dallas Cowboys during a Week 5 44–20. During Week 9 against his former team, the Las Vegas Raiders, he had 122 scrimmage yards in the 23–16 victory.

Booker finished the 2021 season with 145 carries for 593 yards and two touchdowns to go along with 40 receptions for 268 yards and a touchdown. He was released on March 3, 2022.

== Career statistics ==
=== NFL ===
Year	Team	Games		Rushing					Receiving					Returning					Fumbles	
Year	Team	GP	GS	Att	Yds	Avg	Lng	TD	Rec	Yds	Avg	Lng	TD	Ret	Yds	Avg	Lng	TD	Fum	Lost
2016	DEN	16	6	174	612	3.5	18	4	31	265	8.5	43T	1	0	0	0.0	0	0	4	3
2017	DEN	13	0	79	299	3.8	26	1	30	275	9.2	29	0	14	276	19.7	28	0	2	1
2018	DEN	16	0	34	183	5.4	26	1	38	275	7.2	30	0	10	234	23.4	35	0	1	1
2019	DEN	16	0	2	9	4.5	5	0	6	57	9.5	25	0	5	112	22.4	32	0	0	0
2020	LV	16	1	93	423	4.5	43	3	17	84	4.9	17	0	0	0	0.0	0	0	1	0
2021	NYG	16	4	145	593	4.1	31	2	40	268	6.7	41	1	0	0	0.0	0	0	0	0
Total		93	11	527	2,119	4.0	43	11	162	1,224	7.6	43T	2	29	622	21.4	35	0	8	5

=== College ===
Season	Team	GP	Rushing				Receiving			
Season	Team	GP	Att	Yds	Avg	TD	Rec	Yds	Avg	TD
2014	Utah	13	292	1,512	5.2	10	43	306	7.1	2
2015	Utah	10	268	1,261	4.7	11	37	316	8.5	0
Total		23	560	2,773	5.0	21	80	622	7.8	2

== Personal life ==
Booker received a bachelor's degree in sociology in December 2015.
