= Kyle Kragen =

American football player (born 1993)

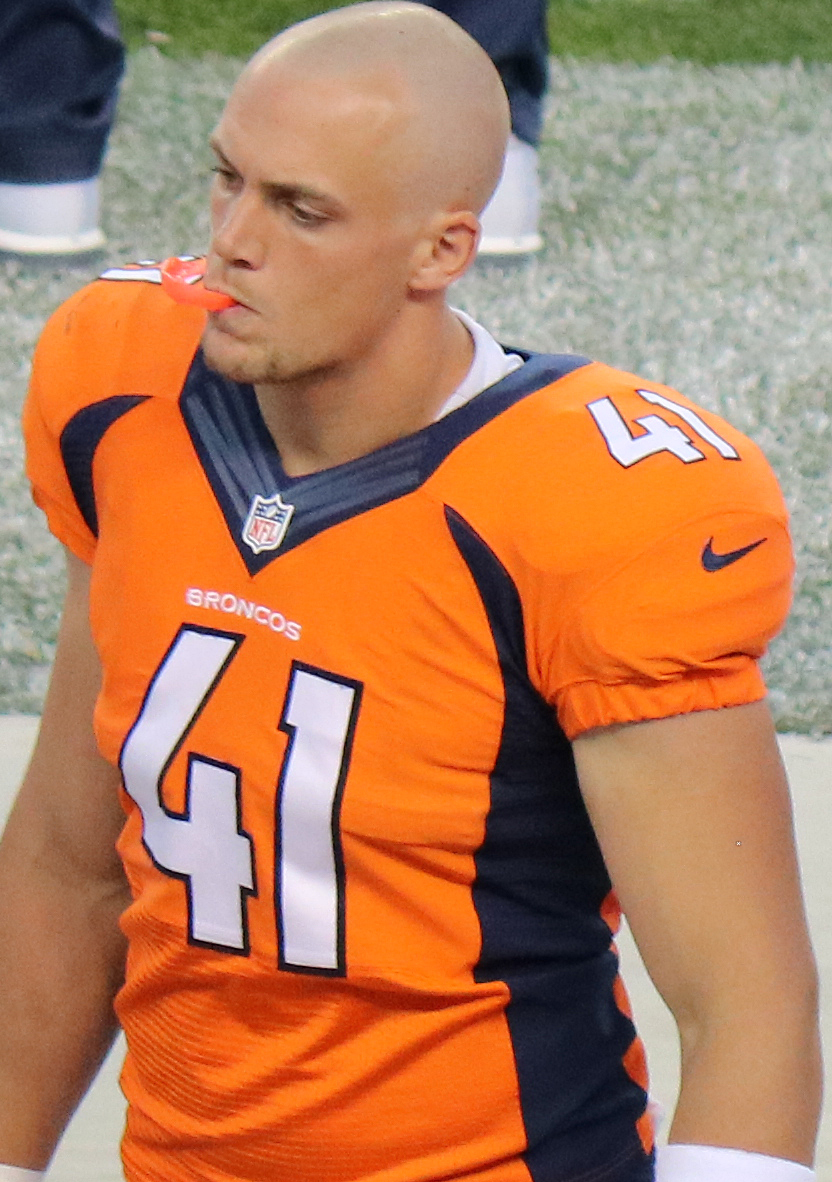
- Kragen with the Denver Broncos in 2016

Profile
- Position: Outside linebacker

Personal information
- Born: February 1, 1993 (age 33); Danville, California, U.S.
- Listed height: 6 ft 2 in (1.88 m)
- Listed weight: 245 lb (111 kg)

Career information
- High school: Danville (CA) San Ramon Valley
- College: California
- NFL draft: 2016: undrafted

Career history
- Denver Broncos (2016)*; Carolina Panthers (2017)*
- * Offseason or practice squad member only

Kyle Kragen (born February 1, 1993) is an American former professional football outside linebacker. He played college football for the University of California, Berkeley. He is the son of former football player Greg Kragen.

== Professional career ==
Pre-draft measurables
Height	Weight	Arm length	Hand span	40-yard dash	10-yard split	20-yard split	20-yard shuttle	Three-cone drill	Vertical jump	Broad jump	Bench press
6 ft 2 1/4 in (1.89 m)	248 lb (112 kg)	32 3/4 in (0.83 m)	9 3/8 in (0.24 m)	4.85 s	1.69 s	2.81 s	4.25 s	7.07 s	37.0 in (0.94 m)	9 ft 6 in (2.90 m)	23 reps
All values from Pro Day

=== Denver Broncos ===
Kragen signed with the Denver Broncos after going undrafted in the 2016 NFL draft. On September 3, 2016, Kragen was waived by the Broncos. The next day he was signed to the Broncos' practice squad. On September 13, 2016, he was released from the Broncos' practice squad.

=== Carolina Panthers ===
On May 6, 2017, Kragen signed with the Carolina Panthers. He was waived on May 18, 2017.
