= Gino Gradkowski =

American football player (born 1988)

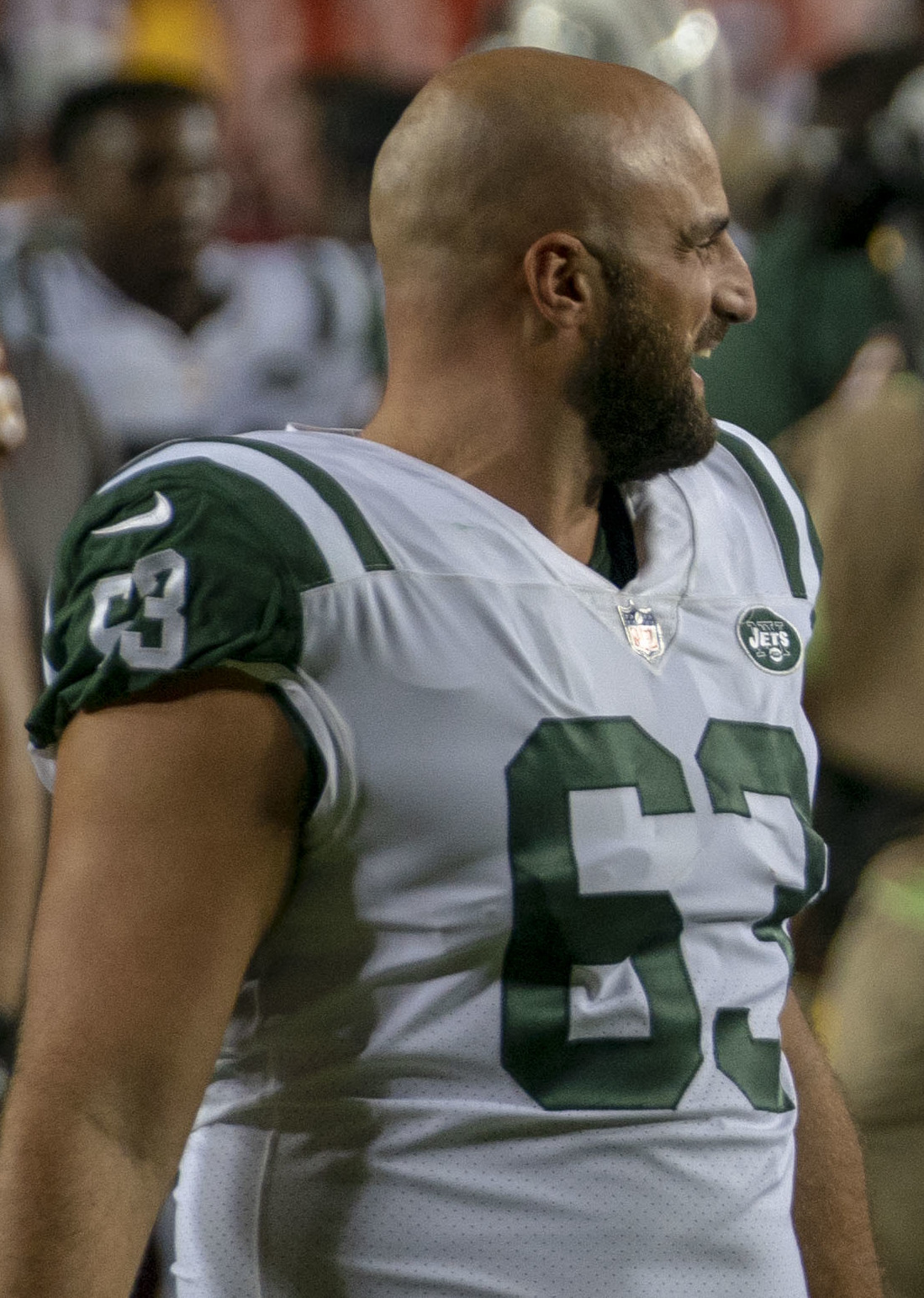
- Gradkowski with the New York Jets in 2018

Personal information
- Born: November 5, 1988 (age 38); Pittsburgh, Pennsylvania, U.S.
- Listed height: 6 ft 3 in (1.91 m)
- Listed weight: 300 lb (136 kg)

Career information
- High school: Seton-La Salle Catholic (Mt. Lebanon, Pennsylvania)
- College: West Virginia (2007–2008); Delaware (2009–2011)
- NFL draft: 2012: 4th round, 98th overall pick

Career history

Playing
- Baltimore Ravens (2012–2014); Denver Broncos (2015)*; Atlanta Falcons (2015); Carolina Panthers (2016); New York Jets (2018)*; Denver Broncos (2018)
- * Offseason or practice squad member only

Coaching
- Rowan (2022) Assistant offensive line coach; Rowan (2023) Offensive line coach; St. Louis Battlehawks (2024) Offensive line coach; Rowan (2024–2025) Offensive coordinator & offensive line coach

Awards and highlights
- Super Bowl champion (XLVII)

Career NFL statistics
- Games played: 60
- Games started: 20
- Fumble recoveries: 1
- Stats at Pro Football Reference

Gino Gradkowski (born November 5, 1988) is an American football coach and former center. He most recently served as the offensive coordinator and offensive line coach for Rowan University, positions he held from 2024 to 2025. He was recently the offensive line coach for the St. Louis Battlehawks of the United Football League (UFL). He played college football at the University of Delaware. He was selected by the Baltimore Ravens in the fourth round of the 2012 NFL draft.

== College career ==
Gradkowski played college football as a guard and a center. He began his career playing for West Virginia University. He later transferred to the University of Delaware. He started all fifteen games as a junior.

== Professional career ==
Pre-draft measurables
Height	Weight	40-yard dash	10-yard split	20-yard split	20-yard shuttle	Three-cone drill	Vertical jump	Broad jump	Bench press
6 ft 2 3/4 in (1.90 m)	300 lb (136 kg)	5.25 s	1.78 s	3.03 s	4.78 s	7.75 s	28.5 in (0.72 m)	8 ft 7 in (2.62 m)	29 reps
All values from Pro Day

=== Baltimore Ravens ===
Gradkowski was selected in the fourth round (98th overall) of the 2012 NFL draft by the Baltimore Ravens. In his first season with the team, the Ravens won Super Bowl XLVII. The game's MVP was Joe Flacco, who was also a transfer to the Delaware Blue Hens. With the retirement of Matt Birk following the 2012 season, Gradkowski became the starting center for the Ravens.

=== Denver Broncos (first stint) ===
Gradkowski was traded to the Denver Broncos on April 1, 2015, for draft picks. He was waived by the Broncos on September 6.

=== Atlanta Falcons ===
Gradkowski was picked up off waivers by the Atlanta Falcons on September 7, 2015.

=== Carolina Panthers ===
On March 10, 2016, Gradkowski signed a three-year, $3.15 million free agent contract with the Carolina Panthers. He also received a $400,000 signing bonus with $450,000 guaranteed. With Pro Bowler Ryan Kalil starting at center, Gradkowski would act as the backup center and guard. When Kalil left with a shoulder injury in Week 11, Gradkowski became the starting center the next week before suffering a knee injury later that game. Both Gradkowski and Kalil were placed on injured reserve on November 29, 2016.

On September 2, 2017, Gradkowski was placed on injured reserve. He was released on September 8, 2017.

=== New York Jets ===
On August 15, 2018, Gradkowski signed with the New York Jets. He was released on August 31, 2018.

=== Denver Broncos (second stint) ===
On November 12, 2018, Gradkowski signed with the Broncos following an injury to Matt Paradis.

== Personal life ==
Gradkowski is the younger brother of former NFL quarterback Bruce Gradkowski.
