= Jordan Taylor (American football) =

American football player (born 1992)

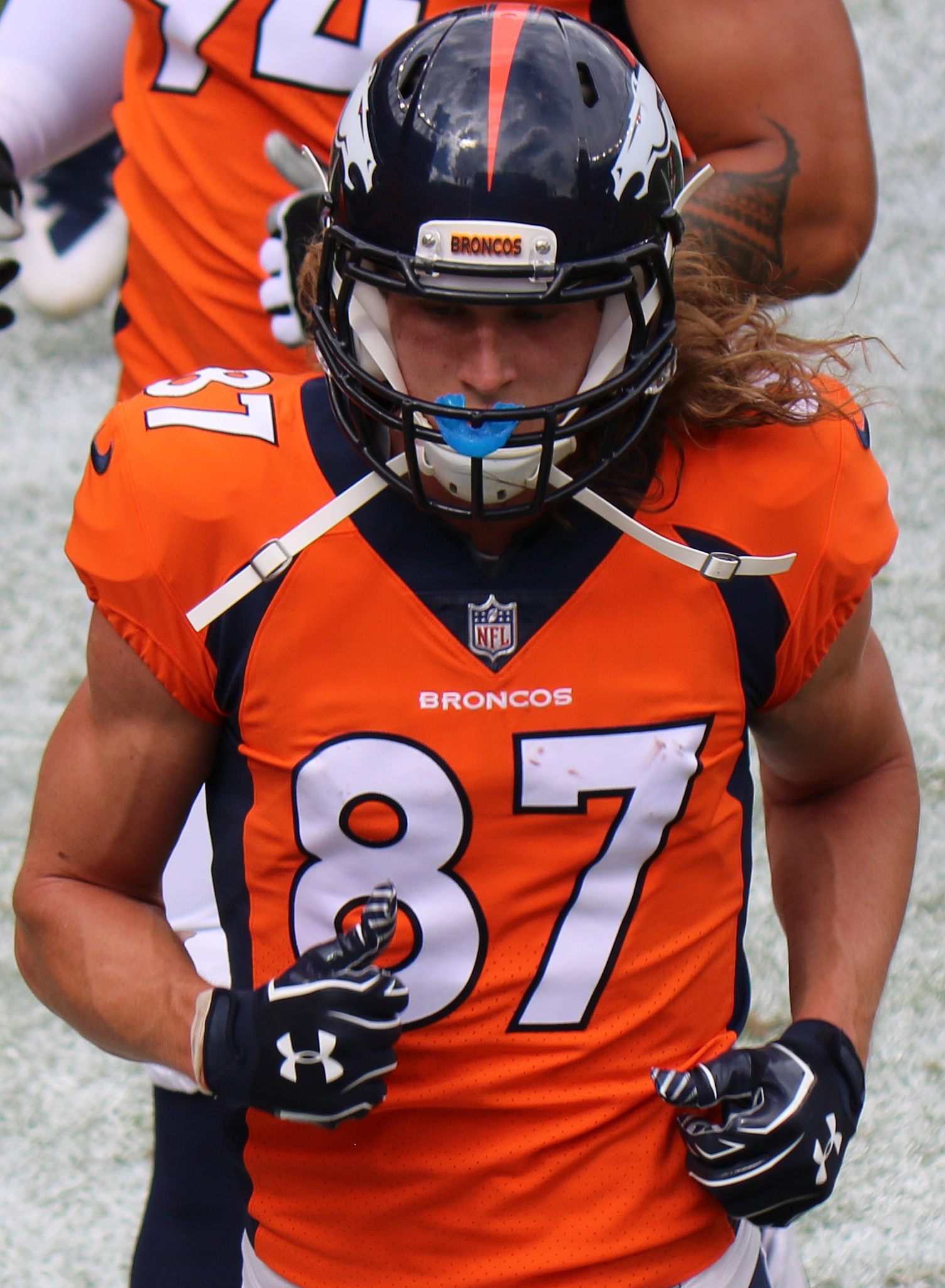
- Taylor with the Denver Broncos in 2017

No. 87, 18
- Position: Wide receiver

Personal information
- Born: February 18, 1992 (age 34); Denison, Texas, U.S.
- Listed height: 6 ft 5 in (1.96 m)
- Listed weight: 195 lb (88 kg)

Career information
- High school: Denison
- College: Rice
- NFL draft: 2015: undrafted

Career history
- Denver Broncos (2015–2018); Minnesota Vikings (2019)*
- * Offseason or practice squad member only

Awards and highlights
- Super Bowl champion (50); Second-team All-C-USA (2013)

Career NFL statistics
- Receptions: 29
- Receiving yards: 351
- Receiving touchdowns: 2
- Stats at Pro Football Reference

Jordan Neel Taylor (born February 18, 1992) is an American former professional football player who was a wide receiver in the National Football League (NFL). He played college football for the Rice Owls and signed as an undrafted free agent with the Denver Broncos in 2015. Taylor won Super Bowl 50 with the Broncos, beating the Carolina Panthers 24–10.

== Professional career ==
Pre-draft measurables
Height	Weight	40-yard dash	20-yard shuttle	Three-cone drill	Vertical jump	Broad jump	Bench press
6 ft 4 3/8 in (1.94 m)	209 lb (95 kg)	4.50 s	4.46 s	6.69 s	36 1/2 in (0.93 m)	10 ft 2 in (3.10 m)	9 reps
All values from combine

=== Denver Broncos ===
Taylor signed with the Broncos as an undrafted free agent on May 2, 2015. He spent his entire rookie season on the Broncos' practice squad where he was a personal receiver for Peyton Manning while Manning was rehabbing from a foot injury during the 2015 season.

On February 7, 2016, Taylor was part of the Broncos team that won Super Bowl 50. In the game, the Broncos defeated the Carolina Panthers by a score of 24–10.

In 2016, Taylor made the Broncos' 53-man roster and made his NFL debut in the season opener against the Carolina Panthers on September 8. He caught his first career NFL pass the following week against the Indianapolis Colts. On November 13, 2016, Taylor caught a 14-yard reception from Trevor Siemian for his first career touchdown during a 25–23 victory over the New Orleans Saints.

On September 1, 2018, Taylor was placed on the physically unable to perform list to start the season while recovering from hip surgery.

=== Minnesota Vikings ===
On April 13, 2019, Taylor signed a one-year contract with the Minnesota Vikings. He was released on August 27.
