= Quentin Gause =

American football player (born 1992)

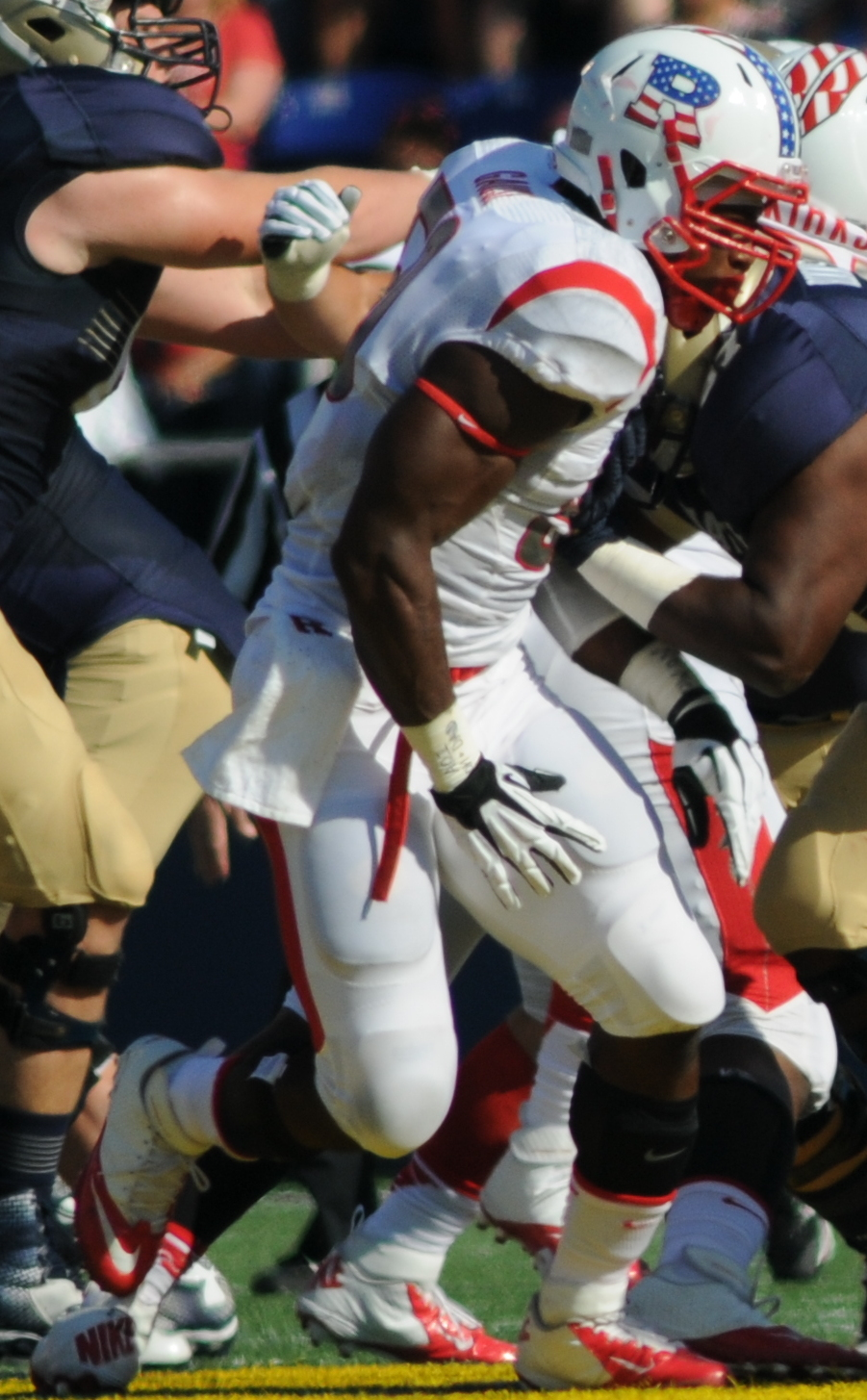
- Gause with Rutgers in 2014

No. 49, 54
- Position: Linebacker

Personal information
- Born: October 30, 1992 (age 34); Rochester, New York, U.S.
- Listed height: 6 ft 0 in (1.83 m)
- Listed weight: 243 lb (110 kg)

Career information
- High school: Bishop Kearney (Irondequoit, New York)
- College: Rutgers
- NFL draft: 2016: undrafted

Career history
- Philadelphia Eagles (2016)*; New England Patriots (2016)*; Denver Broncos (2016); Ottawa Redblacks (2018); Memphis Express (2019); Los Angeles Wildcats (2020); Massachusetts Pirates (2021)
- * Offseason or practice squad member only

Awards and highlights
- United Bowl Champion (2021)

Career NFL statistics
- Tackles: 2
- Stats at Pro Football Reference
- Stats at CFL.ca

Quentin Gause (born October 30, 1992) is an American former professional football player who was a linebacker in the National Football League (NFL). He played college football for the Rutgers Scarlet Knights and signed with the Philadelphia Eagles as an undrafted free agent in 2016.

== Professional career ==
=== Philadelphia Eagles ===
Gause signed with the Philadelphia Eagles as an undrafted free agent on May 5, 2016. He was released by the Eagles on September 3, 2016, during final roster cuts. He was signed to the practice squad on September 5, 2016, but was released later that day.

=== New England Patriots ===
On September 7, 2016, Gause was signed to the Patriots' practice squad. He was released by the Patriots on October 5, 2016.

=== Denver Broncos ===
On October 18, 2016, Gause was signed to the Broncos' practice squad. He was promoted to the active roster on December 10, 2016.

On September 2, 2017, Gause was waived by the Broncos.

=== Memphis Express ===
In 2019, Gause joined the Memphis Express of the Alliance of American Football (AAF). The league ceased operations in April 2019.

=== Los Angeles Wildcats ===
In October 2019, Gause was selected by the Los Angeles Wildcats as part of the 2020 XFL draft's open phase. He had his contract terminated when the league suspended operations on April 10, 2020.

=== Massachusetts Pirates ===
On August 21, 2021, Gause signed with the Massachusetts Pirates of the Indoor Football League, where he would win the 2021 United Bowl championship. On January 17, 2022, Gause was released by the Pirates.
