= Vontarrius Dora =

American football player (born 1992)

No. 59, 54
- Position: Linebacker

Personal information
- Born: September 7, 1992 (age 34); West Point, Mississippi, U.S.
- Listed height: 6 ft 4 in (1.93 m)
- Listed weight: 256 lb (116 kg)

Career information
- High school: West Point
- College: Louisiana Tech
- NFL draft: 2016: undrafted

Career history
- Denver Broncos (2016); Arizona Cardinals (2017)*; Indianapolis Colts (2017)*; Arizona Cardinals (2017–2019); Winnipeg Blue Bombers (2021)
- * Offseason or practice squad member only

Career NFL statistics
- Total tackles: 3
- Stats at Pro Football Reference

Vontarrius Dora (born September 7, 1992) is an American former professional football player who was a linebacker in the National Football League (NFL). He played college football for the Louisiana Tech Bulldogs and was signed by the Denver Broncos as an undrafted free agent in 2016.

== Professional career ==
=== Denver Broncos ===
Dora was signed by the Denver Broncos as an undrafted free agent on May 2, 2016. He was released on September 3, 2016, and was signed to the practice squad the next day. He was promoted to the active roster on December 16, 2016.

On September 2, 2017, Dora was waived by the Broncos.

=== Arizona Cardinals (first stint) ===
On October 4, 2017, Dora was signed to the Arizona Cardinals' practice squad. He was released on October 16, 2017.

=== Indianapolis Colts ===
On October 31, 2017, Dora was signed to the Indianapolis Colts' practice squad. He was released on November 14, 2017.

=== Arizona Cardinals (second stint) ===
On December 19, 2017, Dora was signed to the Cardinals' practice squad. He signed a reserve/future contract with the Cardinals on January 2, 2018.

On September 2, 2018, Dora was waived by the Cardinals. He was re-signed to the practice squad on October 30, 2018. He was promoted to the active roster on November 17, 2018, but was waived three days later and re-signed back to the practice squad. On December 4, 2018, Dora was promoted to the active roster after Olsen Pierre was placed on injured reserve.

On August 31, 2019, Dora was waived by the Cardinals and was signed to the practice squad the next day, but was released two days later. On November 13, 2019, Dora was signed to the Cardinals practice squad. He was promoted to the active roster on December 18, 2019. He was waived on July 26, 2020.

=== Winnipeg Blue Bombers ===
Dora signed with the Winnipeg Blue Bombers of the Canadian Football League on January 15, 2021. He was placed on the suspended list on July 9, 2021. He was released on September 28, 2021.
