= Iosia Iosia =

American football player (born 1991)

Profile
- Position: Defensive end

Personal information
- Born: December 28, 1991 (age 34); San Francisco, California
- Listed height: 6 ft 7 in (2.01 m)
- Listed weight: 297 lb (135 kg)

Career information
- College: West Texas A&M
- NFL draft: 2016: undrafted

Career history
- Tennessee Titans (2016)*; Arizona Cardinals (2016)*; Denver Broncos (2016–2017)*
- * Offseason or practice squad member only
- Stats at Pro Football Reference

Iosia Iosia (born December 28, 1991) is an American football defensive end who is currently a free agent. He played college football at West Texas A&M.
