= Dillon Day (American football) =

American football player (born 1991)

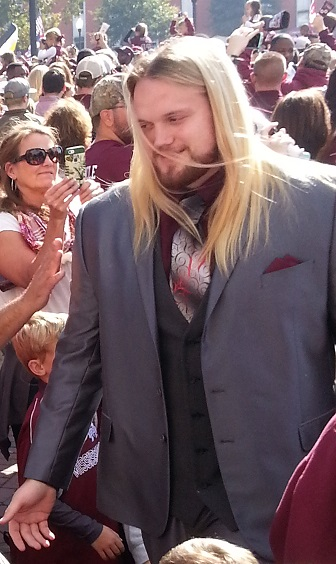
- Day in 2014

No. 62, 55, 64, 54, 77, 50
- Position: Center

Personal information
- Born: October 17, 1991 (age 35); West Monroe, Louisiana, U.S.
- Listed height: 6 ft 4 in (1.93 m)
- Listed weight: 299 lb (136 kg)

Career information
- High school: West Monroe (West Monroe, Louisiana)
- College: Mississippi State
- NFL draft: 2015: undrafted

Career history
- Denver Broncos (2015–2017); Indianapolis Colts (2017); Denver Broncos (2017)*; Green Bay Packers (2017); San Francisco 49ers (2019)*; Seattle Dragons (2020)
- * Offseason or practice squad member only

Awards and highlights
- Super Bowl champion (50)
- Stats at Pro Football Reference

Dillon Anthony Day (born October 17, 1991) is an American former football center. He played college football for Mississippi State, where he was the starting center for four years: 2011, 2012, 2013, and 2014.

== Professional career ==
=== Denver Broncos ===
After going undrafted in the 2015 NFL draft, Day signed with the Denver Broncos where he spent the whole season on the team's practice squad. On February 7, 2016, Day was part of the Broncos team that won Super Bowl 50 over the Carolina Panthers by a score of 24–10.

On September 3, 2016, Day was waived by the Broncos, and was signed to the practice squad the next day. Day spent the entire season once again on the practice squad and signed a reserve/future contract with the Broncos on January 2, 2017.

On September 2, 2017, Day was waived by the Broncos and was signed to the practice squad the next day. After spending over two straight seasons on the Broncos' practice squad, Day was promoted to the active roster on October 21, 2017. He was waived by the Broncos on October 24, 2017.

=== Indianapolis Colts ===
On October 25, 2017, Day was claimed off waivers by the Indianapolis Colts. He was waived by the Colts on November 6, 2017.

=== Denver Broncos (second stint) ===
On November 8, 2017, Day was signed to the Broncos' practice squad.

=== Green Bay Packers ===
On December 20, 2017, Day was signed by the Green Bay Packers off the Broncos' practice squad.

On September 1, 2018, Day was waived by the Packers.

=== San Francisco 49ers ===
On July 26, 2019, Day signed a one-year contract with the San Francisco 49ers. He was released on August 27, 2019.

=== Seattle Dragons ===
In October 2019, Day was drafted by the Seattle Dragons in the 2020 XFL draft. He had his contract terminated when the league suspended operations on April 10, 2020.
