= 2016 Jacksonville Jaguars season =

22nd season in franchise history

- Owner: Shahid Khan
- General manager: David Caldwell
- Head coach: Gus Bradley (fired on December 18, 2-12 record); Doug Marrone (interim, 1-1 record)
- Offensive coordinator: Greg Olson
- Defensive coordinator: Todd Wash
- Home stadium: EverBank Field

Results
- Record: 3–13
- Division place: 4th AFC South
- Playoffs: Did not qualify
- All-Pros: None
- Pro Bowlers: None

Uniform
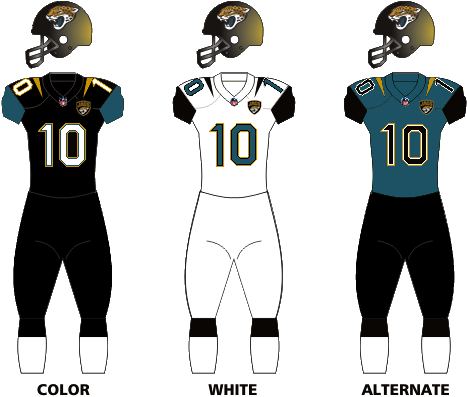

The 2016 season was the Jacksonville Jaguars' 22nd in the National Football League (NFL), and their fourth and final season under head coach Gus Bradley, who was fired after the Week 15 game against the Houston Texans. The Jaguars missed the playoffs for the ninth consecutive season.

== Offseason ==
=== Notable transactions ===
==== Acquisitions ====
- FS Tashaun Gipson, signed on March 10, 2016.
- RB Chris Ivory, signed on March 10, 2016.
- DT Malik Jackson, signed on March 10, 2016.
- P Brad Nortman, signed on March 10, 2016.
- G Mackenzy Bernadeau, signed on March 11, 2016
- CB Prince Amukamara, signed on March 11, 2016
- OT Kelvin Beachum, signed on March 16, 2016
- QB Chad Henne, re-signed on February 18, 2016

==== Departures ====
- G Zane Beadles (2014–2015), released on March 3, 2016.
- DE Chris Clemons (2014–2015), released on March 3, 2016.
- P Bryan Anger (2012–2015), declared free agent on March 9, 2016.
- DE Andre Branch (2012–2015), declared free agent on March 9, 2016.
- C Stefen Wisniewski (2015), declared free agent on March 9, 2016.
- RB Toby Gerhart (2014–2015), released on March 10, 2016.
- WR Damian Copeland (2014–2015), released on March 31, 2016.
- LB Tyrone Holmes (2016), released on September 7, 2016.

=== NFL draft ===
2016 Jacksonville Jaguars draft
Round	Pick	Player	Position	College	Notes
1	5	Jalen Ramsey *	Cornerback	Florida State	
2	36	Myles Jack	Linebacker	UCLA	
3	69	Yannick Ngakoue *	Defensive end	Maryland	
4	103	Sheldon Day	Defensive tackle	Notre Dame	
6	181	Tyrone Holmes	Linebacker	Montana	
6	201	Brandon Allen	Quarterback	Arkansas	
7	226	Jonathan Woodard	Defensive end	Central Arkansas	
Made roster † Pro Football Hall of Fame * Made at least one Pro Bowl during career

Draft trades

- The Jaguars acquired an additional sixth-round selection in a trade that sent placekicker Josh Scobee to the Pittsburgh Steelers.
- The Jaguars traded their second- and fifth-round selections (38th and 146th) to Baltimore for its second-round selection (36th).

== Staff ==
2016 Jacksonville Jaguars staff
Front office: Owner – Shahid Khan; President – Mark Lamping; General Manager – David Caldwell; Senior Vice President, Football Technology & Analytics – Tony Khan; Special Assistant to the General Manager – John Idzik Jr.; Director of Football Administration – Tim Walsh; Director of Football Operations – Hamzah Ahmad; Director of Player Personnel – Chris Polian; Assistant Director of Player Personnel – Andy Dengler; Director of Pro Personnel – Chris Driggers; Assistant Director of Pro Personnel – DeJuan Polk; Director of College Scouting – Mark Ellenz; Assistant Director of College Scouting – Paul Roell; Director of Player Development and Youth Football – Marcus Pollard; Assistant to the Head Coach and Administrator of Coaching Operations – ElizaBeth Mayers; Head coaches: Head coach – Gus Bradley; Interim head coach/assistant head coach/offensive line – Doug Marrone; Head coach's associate – Tyler Wolf; Offensive coaches: Offensive coordinator – Greg Olson; Interim offensive coordinator/quarterbacks – Nathaniel Hackett; Running backs – Kelly Skipper; Wide receivers – Jerry Sullivan; Assistant wide receivers – Tony Sorrentino; Tight ends – Ron Middleton; Assistant offensive line – John Benton; Offensive quality control – John Donovan; Offensive coaches assistant – Chris O'Hara	Defensive coaches: Defensive coordinator – Todd Wash; Assistant defensive line – Aaron Whitecotton; Linebackers – Robert Saleh; Assistant linebackers – Scottie Hazelton; Defensive backs – DeWayne Walker; Assistant defensive backs – Daniel Bullocks; Defensive assistant – Monte Kiffin; Defensive assistant – Mike Rutenberg; Defensive quality control – Dan Shamash; Special teams coaches: Special teams coordinator – Mike Mallory; Assistant special teams – Matthew Smiley; Strength and conditioning: Strength and conditioning – Tom Myslinski; Assistant strength and conditioning – Cedric Scott; Strength and conditioning associate – Alex Hampton; Strength and conditioning associate – Jess Langvardt

== Final roster ==
2016 Jacksonville Jaguars roster
Quarterbacks (QB): 10 Brandon Allen; 5 Blake Bortles; 7 Chad Henne; Running backs (RB): 36 Joe Banyard; 30 Corey Grant KR; 34 Bronson Hill; 33 Chris Ivory; 38 Daryl Richardson; 16 Denard Robinson; Wide receivers (WR): 17 Arrelious Benn; 88 Allen Hurns; 11 Marqise Lee; 15 Allen Robinson; 81 Bryan Walters; 12 Tony Washington; 14 Shane Wynn; Tight ends (TE): 48 Alex Ellis; 83 Ben Koyack; 87 Neal Sterling	Offensive linemen (OL): 68 Kelvin Beachum T; 70 Luke Bowanko C; 60 A. J. Cann G; 65 Brandon Linder C; 78 Jermey Parnell T; 69 Tyler Shatley C/G; 72 Josh Wells T; Defensive linemen (DL): 93 Tyson Alualu DE; 92 Sheldon Day DT; 56 Dante Fowler DE; 79 Jordan Hill DT; 90 Malik Jackson DT; 95 Abry Jones DT; 99 Sen'Derrick Marks DT; 91 Yannick Ngakoue DE; 98 Chris Smith DE	Linebackers (LB): 44 Myles Jack OLB; 51 Paul Posluszny MLB; 52 Hayes Pullard MLB; 54 Marcus Rush OLB; 55 Dan Skuta OLB; 50 Telvin Smith OLB; Defensive backs (DB): 21 Prince Amukamara CB; 37 Johnathan Cyprien SS; 35 Akeem Davis SS; 39 Tashaun Gipson FS; 31 Davon House CB; 29 Josh Johnson CB; 20 Jalen Ramsey CB; 25 Peyton Thompson FS; 47 Jarrod Wilson SS; Special teams (ST): 2 Jason Myers K; 3 Brad Nortman P; 46 Carson Tinker LS	Practice squad: 85 E. J. Bibbs TE; 97 Rodney Coe DT; 26 Doran Grant CB; 62 Nila Kasitati G; 58 Raphael Kirby MLB; 18 Rashad Lawrence WR (IR); 19 Mekale McKay WR; 74 Louis Nix DT; 86 Gannon Sinclair TE; 67 Arturo Uzdavinis T; Reserve: 96 Michael Bennett DT (IR); 22 Aaron Colvin CB (IR); 13 Rashad Greene WR (IR); 76 Luke Joeckel G/T (IR); 89 Marcedes Lewis TE (IR); 97 Roy Miller DT (IR); 75 Jared Odrick DE (IR); 77 Patrick Omameh G (IR); 53 Sean Porter OLB (IR); 73 Jeremiah Poutasi G (IR); 64 Chris Reed G (IR); 23 James Sample FS (IR); 80 Julius Thomas TE (IR); 66 Jonathan Woodard DE (PUP); 24 T. J. Yeldon RB (IR); Rookies in italics 53 active, 16 reserve, 9 practice squad

== Preseason ==
Week	Date	Opponent	Result	Record	Venue	Recap
1	August 11	at New York Jets	L 13–17	0–1	MetLife Stadium	Recap
2	August 20	Tampa Bay Buccaneers	L 21–27	0–2	EverBank Field	Recap
3	August 28	Cincinnati Bengals	W 26–21	1–2	EverBank Field	Recap
4	September 1	at Atlanta Falcons	L 15–17	1–3	Georgia Dome	Recap

== Regular season ==
On November 25, 2015, the NFL announced that the Jaguars would play host to the Indianapolis Colts in the International Series at Wembley Stadium in London, England, in the fourth consecutive home game for the Jaguars in the International Series. The game occurred during Week 4 on Sunday, October 2, and was aired by CBS in the United States. The kickoff time was announced on April 14, with the Jaguars having their bye the following week. The remainder of the Jaguars' 2016 schedule, with exact dates and times, was finalized and announced on April 14.

=== Schedule ===
Week	Date	Opponent	Result	Record	Venue	Recap
1	September 11	Green Bay Packers	**L** 23–27	0–1	EverBank Field	Recap
2	September 18	at San Diego Chargers	**L** 14–38	0–2	Qualcomm Stadium	Recap
3	September 25	Baltimore Ravens	**L** 17–19	0–3	EverBank Field	Recap
4	October 2	**Indianapolis Colts**	**W** 30–27	1–3	(United Kingdom) Wembley Stadium (London)	Recap
5	Bye					
6	October 16	at Chicago Bears	**W** 17–16	2–3	Soldier Field	Recap
7	October 23	Oakland Raiders	**L** 16–33	2–4	EverBank Field	Recap
8	October 27	at **Tennessee Titans**	**L** 22–36	2–5	Nissan Stadium	Recap
9	November 6	at Kansas City Chiefs	**L** 14–19	2–6	Arrowhead Stadium	Recap
10	November 13	**Houston Texans**	**L** 21–24	2–7	EverBank Field	Recap
11	November 20	at Detroit Lions	**L** 19–26	2–8	Ford Field	Recap
12	November 27	at Buffalo Bills	**L** 21–28	2–9	New Era Field	Recap
13	December 4	Denver Broncos	**L** 10–20	2–10	EverBank Field	Recap
14	December 11	Minnesota Vikings	**L** 16–25	2–11	EverBank Field	Recap
15	December 18	at **Houston Texans**	**L** 20–21	2–12	NRG Stadium	Recap
16	December 24	**Tennessee Titans**	**W** 38–17	3–12	EverBank Field	Recap
17	January 1	at **Indianapolis Colts**	**L** 20–24	3–13	Lucas Oil Stadium	Recap

Note: Intra-division opponents are in bold text.

=== Game summaries ===
==== Week 1: vs. Green Bay Packers ====
Week One: Green Bay Packers at Jacksonville Jaguars – Game summary

Quarter	1	2	3	4	Total
**Packers**	7	14	3	3	**27**
Jaguars	7	10	3	3	**23**

at EverBank Field, Jacksonville, Florida

- Date: September 11, 2016
- Game time: 1:00 p.m. EDT
- Game weather: 90 °F (32 °C)
- Game attendance: 63,179
- Referee: Carl Cheffers
- TV announcers (Fox): Kevin Burkhardt, John Lynch, and Pam Oliver
- Recap, Game Book

Game information

**First quarter**

- GB – Aaron Rodgers 6-yard run (Mason Crosby kick), 9:45. Packers 7–0. **Drive: 6 plays, 29 yards, 3:05.**
- JAX – T. J. Yeldon 5-yard run (Jason Myers kick), 3:43. Tied 7–7. **Drive: 3 plays, 48 yards, 1:24.**

**Second quarter**

- JAX – Jason Myers 26-yard field goal, 7:52. Jaguars 10–7. **Drive: 12 plays, 45 yards, 5:52.**
- GB – Jordy Nelson 6-yard pass from Aaron Rodgers (Mason Crosby kick), 3:14. Packers 14–10. **Drive: 9 plays, 75 yards, 4:43.**
- JAX – Julius Thomas 22-yard pass from Blake Bortles (Jason Myers kick), 1:09. Jaguars 17–14. **Drive: 7 plays, 75 yards, 1:56.**
- GB – Davante Adams 29-yard pass from Aaron Rodgers (Mason Crosby kick), 0:20. Packers 21–17. **Drive: 5 plays, 75 yards, 0:56.**

**Third quarter**

- GB – Mason Crosby 25-yard field goal, 10:12. Packers 24–17. **Drive: 13 plays, 68 yards, 4:48.**
- JAX – Jason Myers 39-yard field goal, 6:15. Packers 24–20. **Drive: 10 plays, 54 yards, 3:57.**

**Fourth quarter**

- GB – Mason Crosby 20-yard field goal, 12:01. Packers 27–20. **Drive: 13 plays, 68 yards, 4:48.**
- JAX – Jason Myers 50-yard field goal, 5:12. Packers 27–23. **Drive: 14 plays, 37 yards, 6:49.**

**Top passers**

- GB – Aaron Rodgers – 20/34, 199 yards, 2 TD
- JAX – Blake Bortles – 24/39, 320 yards, TD, INT

**Top rushers**

- GB – Eddie Lacy – 14 rushes, 61 yards
- JAX – T. J. Yeldon – 21 rushes, 39 yards, TD

**Top receivers**

- GB – Randall Cobb – 6 receptions, 57 yards
- JAX – Allen Hurns – 4 receptions, 75 yards

**Top tacklers**

- GB – Morgan Burnett – 8 tackles, 1 assist, 1 sack
- JAX – Johnathan Cyprien – 9 tackles

==== Week 2: at San Diego Chargers ====
Week Two: Jacksonville Jaguars at San Diego Chargers – Game summary

Quarter	1	2	3	4	Total
Jaguars	0	0	0	14	**14**
**Chargers**	7	14	14	3	**38**

at Qualcomm Stadium, San Diego, California

- Date: September 18, 2016
- Game time: 1:25 p.m. PDT
- Game weather: Sunny, 82 °F (28 °C)
- Game attendance: 52,165
- Referee: Carl Cheffers
- TV announcers (CBS): Tom McCarthy and Adam Archuleta
- Recap, Game Book

Game information

**First quarter**

- SD – Melvin Gordon 3-yard run (Josh Lambo kick), 10:14. Chargers 7–0. **Drive: 8 plays, 75 yards, 4:46.**

**Second quarter**

- SD – Travis Benjamin 6-yard pass from Philip Rivers (Josh Lambo kick), 14:54. Chargers 14–0. **Drive: 7 plays, 34 yards, 3:34.**
- SD – Antonio Gates 2-yard pass from Philip Rivers (Josh Lambo kick), 9:54. Chargers 21–0. **Drive: 5 plays, 56 yards, 2:11.**

**Third quarter**

- SD – Tyrell Williams 44-yard pass from Philip Rivers (Josh Lambo kick), 10:54. Chargers 28–0. **Drive: 3 plays, 55 yards, 1:33.**
- SD – Travis Benjamin 45-yard pass from Philip Rivers (Josh Lambo kick), 2:48. Chargers 35–0. **Drive: 7 plays, 93 yards, 4:18.**

**Fourth quarter**

- JAX – Marcedes Lewis 4-yard pass from Blake Bortles (Jason Myers kick), 12:54. Chargers 35–7. **Drive: 12 plays, 75 yards, 4:54.**
- SD – Josh Lambo 25-yard field goal, 7:00. Chargers 38–7. **Drive: 11 plays, 36 yards, 5:54.**
- JAX – Corey Grant 15-yard pass from Blake Bortles (Jason Myers kick), 1:04. Chargers 38–14. **Drive: 9 plays, 60 yards, 2:30.**

**Top passers**

- JAX – Blake Bortles – 31/50, 329 yards, 2 TD, 2 INT
- SD – Philip Rivers – 17/24, 220 yards, 4 TD

**Top rushers**

- JAX – Blake Bortles – 3 rushes, 34 yards
- SD – Melvin Gordon – 24 rushes, 102 yards, TD

**Top receivers**

- JAX – Marqise Lee – 5 receptions, 75 yards
- SD – Travis Benjamin – 6 receptions, 115 yards, 2 TD

**Top tacklers**

- JAX – Telvin Smith – 7 tackles, 2 assists
- SD – Dwight Lowery – 7 tackles, 1 assist

==== Week 3: vs. Baltimore Ravens ====
Week Three: Baltimore Ravens at Jacksonville Jaguars – Game summary

Quarter	1	2	3	4	Total
**Ravens**	7	6	3	3	**19**
Jaguars	0	7	7	3	**17**

at EverBank Field, Jacksonville, Florida

- Date: September 25, 2016
- Game time: 1:00 p.m. EDT
- Game weather: 88 °F (31 °C)
- Game attendance: 60,127
- Referee: Gene Steratore
- TV announcers (CBS): Tom McCarthy, Adam Archuleta, and Chris Fischer
- Recap, Game Book

Game information

**First quarter**

- BAL – Joe Flacco 7-yard run (Justin Tucker kick), 3:52. Ravens 7–0. **Drive: 8 plays, 75 yards, 4:03.**

**Second quarter**

- BAL – Justin Tucker 43-yard field goal, 11:07. Ravens 10–0. **Drive: 10 plays, 46 yards, 5:47.**
- JAX – Allen Robinson 3-yard pass from Blake Bortles (Jason Myers kick), 1:55. Ravens 10–7. **Drive: 8 plays, 37 yards, 3:50.**
- BAL – Justin Tucker 42-yard field goal, 0:00. Ravens 13–7. **Drive: 8 plays, 51 yards, 1:55.**

**Third quarter**

- BAL – Justin Tucker 37-yard field goal, 10:21. Ravens 16–7. **Drive: 9 plays, 56 yards, 4:39.**
- JAX – Allen Robinson 12-yard pass from Blake Bortles (Jason Myers kick), 4:59. Ravens 16–14. **Drive: 11 plays, 78 yards, 5:22.**

**Fourth quarter**

- JAX – Jason Myers 45-yard field goal, 7:27. Jaguars 17–16. **Drive: 4 plays, 8 yards, 1:34.**
- BAL – Justin Tucker 53-yard field goal, 1:02. Ravens 19–17. **Drive: 8 plays, 22 yards, 1:57.**

**Top passers**

- BAL – Joe Flacco – 29/40, 214 yards, 2 INT
- JAX – Blake Bortles – 24/38, 194 yards, 2 TD, 3 INT

**Top rushers**

- BAL – Terrance West – 10 rushes, 45 yards
- JAX – Blake Bortles – 3 rushes, 17 yards

**Top receivers**

- BAL – Steve Smith Sr. – 8 receptions, 87 yards
- JAX – Allen Robinson – 7 receptions, 57 yards, 2 TD

**Top tacklers**

- BAL – Paul Posluszny – 10 tackles, 2 assists, INT
- JAX – Zach Orr – 6 tackles, 2 assists, INT

==== Week 4: vs. Indianapolis Colts ====
NFL International Series

Week Four: Indianapolis Colts at Jacksonville Jaguars – Game summary

Quarter	1	2	3	4	Total
Colts	3	3	0	21	**27**
**Jaguars**	7	10	6	7	**30**

at Wembley Stadium, London, England

- Date: October 2, 2016
- Game time: 2:30 p.m. BST/9:30 a.m. EDT
- Game weather: Sunny intervals, 59 °F (15 °C)
- Game attendance: 83,764
- Referee: Walt Anderson
- TV announcers (CBS): Greg Gumbel, Trent Green, and Jamie Erdahl
- Recap, Game Book

Game information

**First quarter**

- JAX – Allen Robinson 3-yard pass from Blake Bortles (Jason Myers kick), 8:23. Jaguars 7–0. **Drive: 5 plays, 24 yards, 2:10.**
- IND – Adam Vinatieri 53-yard field goal, 1:50. Jaguars 7–3. **Drive: 12 plays, 29 yards, 6:33.**

**Second quarter**

- IND – Adam Vinatieri 49-yard field goal, 8:53. Jaguars 7–6. **Drive: 11 plays, 44 yards, 6:10.**
- JAX – Blake Bortles 1-yard run (Jason Myers kick), 4:59. Jaguars 14–6.**Drive: 10 plays, 75 yards, 4:44.**
- JAX – Jason Myers 22-yard field goal, 0:00. Jaguars 17–6. **Drive: 8 plays, 75 yards, 1:06.**

**Third quarter**

- JAX – Jason Myers 46-yard field goal, 11:50. Jaguars 20–6. **Drive: 9 plays, 43 yards, 3:10.**
- JAX – Jason Myers 49-yard field goal, 2:51. Jaguars 23–6. **Drive: 14 plays, 58 yards, 6:48.**

**Fourth quarter**

- IND – Frank Gore 1-yard run (Adam Vinatieri kick), 14:48. Jaguars 23–13. **Drive: 9 plays, 75 yards, 3:03.**
- IND – T. Y. Hilton 2-yard pass from Andrew Luck (Adam Vinatieri kick), 7:06. Jaguars 23–20. **Drive: 12 plays, 78 yards, 5:31.**
- JAX – Allen Hurns 42-yard pass from Blake Bortles (Jason Myers kick), 5:03. Jaguars 30–20. **Drive: 4 plays, 75 yards, 2:03.**
- IND – Phillip Dorsett 64-yard pass from Andrew Luck (Adam Vinatieri kick), 3:03. Jaguars 30–27. **Drive: 6 plays, 75 yards, 2:00.**

**Top passers**

- IND – Andrew Luck – 27/42, 234 yards, 2 TD, INT
- JAX – Blake Bortles – 19/33, 207 yards, 2 TD

**Top rushers**

- IND – Frank Gore – 16 rushes, 68 yards, TD
- JAX – T. J. Yeldon – 14 rushes, 71 yards

**Top receivers**

- IND – Phillipp Dorsett – 1 reception, 64 yards, TD
- JAX – Allen Robinson – 5 receptions, 55 yards, TD

**Top tacklers**

- IND – D'Qwell Jackson – 6 tackles
- JAX – Telvin Smith – 8 tackles

==== Week 6: at Chicago Bears ====
Week Six: Jacksonville Jaguars at Chicago Bears – Game summary

Quarter	1	2	3	4	Total
**Jaguars**	0	0	0	17	**17**
Bears	0	10	3	3	**16**

at Soldier Field, Chicago, Illinois

- Date: October 16, 2016
- Game time: 12:00 p.m. CDT
- Game weather: Cloudy, 69 °F (21 °C)
- Game attendance: 61,054
- Referee: Clete Blakeman
- TV announcers (CBS): Andrew Catalon, Steve Beuerlein, and Steve Tasker
- Recap, Game Book

Game information

**First quarter**

- No scoring plays.

**Second quarter**

- CHI – Connor Barth 36-yard field goal, 14:12. Bears 3–0. **Drive: 11 plays, 58 yards, 5:30.**
- CHI – Jordan Howard 1-yard run (Connor Barth kick), 4:29. Bears 10–0. **Drive: 16 plays, 86 yards, 7:31.**

**Third quarter**

- CHI – Connor Barth 24-yard field goal, 1:53. Bears 13–0. **Drive: 11 plays, 74 yards, 5:43.**

**Fourth quarter**

- JAX – Chris Ivory 1-yard run (Jason Myers kick), 14:50. Bears 13–7. **Drive: 5 plays, 75 yards, 2:03.**
- CHI – Connor Barth 32-yard field goal, 8:28. Bears 16–7. **Drive: 6 plays, 14 yards, 3:06.**
- JAX – Jason Myers 30-yard field goal, 4:59. Bears 16–10. **Drive: 11 plays, 63 yards, 3:29.**
- JAX – Arrelious Benn 51-yard pass from Blake Bortles (Jason Myers kick), 2:49. Jaguars 17–16. **Drive: 4 plays, 78 yards, 0:29.**

**Top passers**

- JAX – Blake Bortles – 20/33, 271 yards, TD, INT
- CHI – Brian Hoyer – 30/49, 302 yards

**Top rushers**

- JAX – Chris Ivory – 11 rushes, 32 yards, TD
- CHI – Ka'Deem Carey – 9 rushes, 50 yards

**Top receivers**

- JAX – Allen Hurns – 5 receptions, 74 yards
- CHI – Cameron Meredith – 11 reception, 113 yards

**Top tacklers**

- JAX – Paul Posluszny – 10 tackles, 1 assist
- CHI – Bryce Callahan – 6 tackles

==== Week 7: vs. Oakland Raiders ====
Week Seven: Oakland Raiders at Jacksonville Jaguars – Game summary

Quarter	1	2	3	4	Total
**Raiders**	3	17	3	10	**33**
Jaguars	0	6	3	7	**16**

at EverBank Field, Jacksonville, Florida

- Date: October 23, 2016
- Game time: 1:00 p.m. EDT
- Game weather: 70 °F (21 °C)
- Game attendance: 62,614
- Referee: Jeff Triplette
- TV announcers (CBS): Greg Gumbel, Trent Green, and Jamie Erdahl
- Recap, GameBook

Game information

**First quarter**

- OAK – Sebastian Janikowski 26-yard field goal, 9:06. Raiders 3–0. **Drive: 9 plays, 63 yards, 3:15.**

**Second quarter**

- OAK – Sebastian Janikowski 32-yard field goal, 14:52. Raiders 6–0. **Drive: 4 plays, 3 yards, 0:12.**
- JAX – Jason Myers 23-yard field goal, 12:38. Raiders 6–3. **Drive: 5 plays, 70 yards, 2:08.**
- OAK – Latavius Murray 2-yard run (Sebastian Janikowski kick), 5:32. Raiders 13–3. **Drive: 11 plays, 75 yards, 7:06.**
- JAX – Jason Myers 37-yard field goal, 1:49. Raiders 13–6. **Drive: 9 plays, 56 yards, 3:43.**
- OAK – Michael Crabtree 2-yard pass from Derek Carr (Sebastian Janikowski kick), 0:11. Raiders 20–6. **Drive: 7 plays, 75 yards, 1:38.**

**Third quarter**

- JAX – Jason Myers 44-yard field goal, 12:11. Raiders 20–9. **Drive: 7 plays, 39 yards, 2:49.**
- OAK – Sebastian Janikowski 44-yard field goal, 2:28. Raiders 23–9. **Drive: 5 plays, 12 yards, 2:17.**

**Fourth quarter**

- OAK – Sebastian Janikowski 52-yard field goal, 11:33. Raiders 26–9. **Drive: 6 plays, 38 yards, 3:44.**
- JAX – Julius Thomas 9-yard pass from Blake Bortles (Jason Myers kick), 4:12. Raiders 26–16. **Drive: 11 plays, 83 yards, 3:03.**
- OAK – Latavius Murray 9-yard run (Sebastian Janikowski kick), 2:35. Raiders 33–16. **Drive: 8 plays, 48 yards, 1:37.**

**Top passers**

- OAK – Derek Carr – 23/37, 200 yards, TD
- JAX – Blake Bortles – 22/43, 246 yards, TD, 2 INT

**Top rushers**

- OAK – Latavius Murray – 18 rushes, 59 yards, 2 TD
- JAX – Chris Ivory – 5 rushes, 48 yards

**Top receivers**

- OAK – Michael Crabtree – 8 receptions, 96 yards, TD
- JAX – Marqise Lee – 7 receptions, 107 yards

**Top tacklers**

- OAK – Malcolm Smith – 6 tackles
- JAX – Johnathan Cyprien – 11 tackles

==== Week 8: at Tennessee Titans ====
Week Eight: Jacksonville Jaguars at Tennessee Titans – Game summary

Quarter	1	2	3	4	Total
Jaguars	0	0	8	14	**22**
**Titans**	3	24	6	3	**36**

at Nissan Stadium, Nashville, Tennessee

- Date: October 27, 2016
- Game time: 7:25 p.m. CDT
- Game weather: Clear, 71 °F (22 °C)
- Game attendance: 61,619
- Referee: John Hussey
- TV announcers (NFLN): Jim Nantz, Phil Simms, and Tracy Wolfson
- Recap, Game Book

Game information

**First quarter**

- TEN – Ryan Succop 32-yard field goal, 3:31. Titans 3–0. **Drive: 10 plays, 54 yards, 5:34.**

**Second quarter**

- TEN – Kendall Wright 36-yard pass from Marcus Mariota (Ryan Succop kick), 14:53. Titans 10–0. **Drive: 4 plays, 66 yards, 1:59.**
- TEN – Derrick Henry 6-yard run (Ryan Succop kick), 10:36. Titans 17–0. **Drive: 8 plays, 69 yards, 3:25.**
- TEN – DeMarco Murray 14-yard run (Ryan Succop kick), 7:09. Titans 24–0. **Drive: 4 plays, 62 yards, 1:43.**
- TEN – Ryan Succop 22-yard field goal, 0:00. Titans 27–0. **Drive: 12 plays, 90 yards, 3:13.**

**Third quarter**

- JAX – Julius Thomas 10-yard pass from Blake Bortles (run succeeded), 11:05. Titans 27–8. **Drive: 11 plays, 75 yards, 3:55.**
- TEN – Rishard Matthews 4-yard pass from Marcus Mariota (kick failed), 6:53. Titans 33–8. **Drive: 7 plays, 75 yards, 4:12.**

**Fourth quarter**

- TEN – Ryan Succop 33-yard field goal, 12:32. Titans 36–8. **Drive: 9 plays, 20 yards, 5:10.**
- JAX – Allen Hurns 5-yard pass from Blake Bortles (Jason Myers kick), 3:11. Titans 36–15. **Drive: 7 plays, 58 yards, 2:08.**
- JAX – Bryan Walters 7-yard pass from Blake Bortles (Jason Myers kick), 0:01. Titans 36–22. **Drive: 12 plays, 91 yards, 2:32.**

**Top passers**

- JAX – Blake Bortles – 33/54, 337 yards, 3 TD
- TEN – Marcus Mariota – 18/22, 270 yards, 2 TD

**Top rushers**

- JAX – Blake Bortles – 4 rushes, 22 yards
- TEN – DeMarco Murray – 21 rushes, 123 yards, TD

**Top receivers**

- JAX – Allen Hurns – 7 receptions, 98 yards, TD
- TEN – Kendall Wright – 4 receptions, 84 yards, TD

**Top tacklers**

- JAX – Telvin Smith – 10 tackles, 5 assists
- TEN – Jason McCourty – 8 tackles, 3 assists

==== Week 9: at Kansas City Chiefs ====
Week Nine: Jacksonville Jaguars at Kansas City Chiefs – Game summary

Quarter	1	2	3	4	Total
Jaguars	0	7	0	7	**14**
**Chiefs**	7	3	6	3	**19**

at Arrowhead Stadium, Kansas City, Missouri

- Date: November 6, 2016
- Game time: 12:00 p.m. CST
- Game weather: 62 °F (17 °C)
- Game attendance: 73,294
- Referee: Gene Steratore
- TV announcers (CBS): Spero Dedes and Solomon Wilcots
- Recap, Game Book

Game information

**First quarter**

- KC – Albert Wilson 23-yard pass from Nick Foles (Cairo Santos kick), 1:49. Chiefs 7–0. **Drive: 2 plays, 23 yards, 0:14.**

**Second quarter**

- KC – Cairo Santos 26-yard field goal, 9:54. Chiefs 10–0. **Drive: 4 plays, 5 yards, 2:05.**
- JAX – Allen Robinson 1-yard pass from Blake Bortles (Jason Myers kick), 0:02. Chiefs 10–7. **Drive: 11 plays, 88 yards, 3:19.**

**Third quarter**

- KC – Cairo Santos 51-yard field goal, 8:43. Chiefs 13–7. **Drive: 4 plays, 5 yards, 1:32.**
- KC – Cairo Santos 24-yard field goal, 3:59. Chiefs 16–7. **Drive: 6 plays, 25 yards, 2:29.**

**Fourth quarter**

- KC – Cairo Santos 36-yard field goal, 10:20. Chiefs 19–7. **Drive: 9 plays, 38 yards, 5:09.**
- JAX – T. J. Yeldon 13-yard pass from Blake Bortles (Jason Myers kick), 4:10. Chiefs 19–14. **Drive: 9 plays, 61 yards, 2:24.**

**Top passers**

- JAX – Blake Bortles – 22/41, 252 yards, 2 TD, INT
- KC – Nick Foles – 20/33, 187 yards, TD

**Top rushers**

- JAX – Chris Ivory – 18 rushes, 107 yards
- KC – Charcandrick West – 13 rushes, 39 yards

**Top receivers**

- JAX – Marqise Lee – 4 receptions, 84 yards
- KC – Travis Kelce – 5 receptions, 58 yards

**Top tacklers**

- JAX – Paul Posluszny – 6 tackles, 4 assists
- KC – Phillip Gaines – 7 tackles, 1 forced fumble

==== Week 10: vs. Houston Texans ====
Week Ten: Houston Texans at Jacksonville Jaguars – Game summary

Quarter	1	2	3	4	Total
**Texans**	14	0	7	3	**24**
Jaguars	7	3	0	11	**21**

at EverBank Field, Jacksonville, Florida

- Date: November 13, 2016
- Game time: 1:00 p.m. EST
- Game weather: 69 °F (21 °C)
- Game attendance: 62,091
- Referee: Ronald Torbert
- TV announcers (CBS): Kevin Harlan and Rich Gannon
- Recap, Game Book

Game information

**First quarter**

- HOU – Kareem Jackson 42-yard interception return (Nick Novak kick), 11:57. Texans 7–0.
- JAX – Julius Thomas 5-yard pass from Blake Bortles (Jason Myers kick), 5:14. Tied 7–7. **Drive: 13 plays, 75 yards, 6:43.**
- HOU – Ryan Griffin 1-yard pass from Brock Osweiler (Nick Novak kick), 0:19. Texans 14–7. **Drive: 10 plays, 75 yards, 4:55.**

**Second quarter**

- JAX – Jason Myers 54-yard field goal, 5:17. Texans 14–10. **Drive: 8 plays, 25 yards, 3:43.**

**Third quarter**

- HOU – Stephen Anderson 7-yard pass from Brock Osweiler (Nick Novak kick), 4:07. Texans 21–10. **Drive: 1 play, 7 yards, 0:05.**

**Fourth quarter**

- JAX – Jason Myers 44-yard field goal, 14:56. Texans 21–13. **Drive: 8 plays, 53 yards, 4:11.**
- HOU – Nick Novak 51-yard field goal, 8:32. Texans 24–13. **Drive: 11 plays, 42 yards, 6:24.**
- JAX – Allen Robinson 14-yard pass from Blake Bortles (pass succeeded), 2:17. Texans 24–21. **Drive: 8 plays, 92 yards, 1:25.**

**Top passers**

- HOU – Brock Osweiler – 14/27, 99 yards, 2 TD
- JAX – Blake Bortles – 32/49, 265 yards, 2 TD, INT

**Top rushers**

- HOU – Lamar Miller – 15 rushes, 83 yards
- JAX – T. J. Yeldon – 9 rushes, 32 yards

**Top receivers**

- HOU – DeAndre Hopkins – 5 receptions, 48 yards
- JAX – Allen Robinson – 9 receptions, 107 yards, TD

**Top tacklers**

- HOU – Johnathan Joseph – 7 tackles
- JAX – Jalen Ramsey – 6 tackles

==== Week 11: at Detroit Lions ====
Week Eleven: Jacksonville Jaguars at Detroit Lions – Game summary

Quarter	1	2	3	4	Total
Jaguars	3	6	10	0	**19**
**Lions**	0	9	7	10	**26**

at Ford Field, Detroit, Michigan

- Date: November 20, 2016
- Game time: 1:00 p.m. EST
- Game weather: None (indoor stadium)
- Game attendance: 61,486
- Referee: Bill Vinovich
- TV announcers (CBS): Andrew Catalon, Steve Beuerlein and Steve Tasker
- Recap, Game Book

Game information

**First quarter**

- JAX – Jason Myers 27-yard field goal, 1:36. Jaguars 3–0. **Drive: 4 plays, 2 yards, 0:54.**

**Second quarter**

- DET – Andre Roberts 55-yard punt return (kick blocked), 11:13. Lions 6–3.
- JAX – Allen Robinson 3-yard pass from Blake Bortles (kick failed, wide right), 2:45. Jaguars 9–6. **Drive: 7 plays, 54 yards, 3:19.**
- DET – Matt Prater 27-yard field goal, 0:19. Tied 9–9. **Drive: 10 plays, 67 yards, 2:26.**

**Third quarter**

- DET – Kareem Jackson 39-yard interception return (Matt Prater kick), 14:02. Lions 16–9.
- JAX – Jason Myers 52-yard field goal, 9:20. Lions 16–12. **Drive: 7 plays, 41 yards, 4:42.**
- JAX – Marqise Lee 3-yard pass from Blake Bortles (Jason Myers kick), 2:10. Jaguars 19–16. **Drive: 9 plays, 87 yards, 4:56.**

**Fourth quarter**

- DET – Eric Ebron 1-yard run (Matt Prater kick), 10:03. Lions 23–19. **Drive: 7 plays, 79 yards, 3:21.**
- DET – Matt Prater 43-yard field goal, 0:22. Lions 26–19. **Drive: 15 plays, 60 yards, 7:57.**

**Top passers**

- JAX – Blake Bortles – 22/35, 202 yards, 2 TD, 2 INT
- DET – Matthew Stafford – 24/33, 278 yards

**Top rushers**

- JAX – Chris Ivory – 17 rushes, 39 yards
- DET – Theo Riddick – 4 rushes, 13 yards

**Top receivers**

- JAX – Chris Ivory – 6 receptions, 75 yards
- DET – Eric Ebron – 3 receptions, 70 yards

**Top tacklers**

- JAX – Telvin Smith – 7 tackles, 1 assist
- DET – Tavon Wilson – 5 tackles, 1 interception

==== Week 12: at Buffalo Bills ====
Week Twelve: Jacksonville Jaguars at Buffalo Bills – Game summary

Quarter	1	2	3	4	Total
Jaguars	7	0	7	7	**21**
**Bills**	0	6	14	8	**28**

at New Era Field, Orchard Park, New York

- Date: November 27, 2016
- Game time: 1:00 p.m. EST
- Game weather: 42 °F (6 °C), mostly cloudy
- Game attendance: 67,849
- Referee: Tony Corrente
- TV announcers (CBS): Andrew Catalon, Steve Beuerlein and Steve Tasker
- Recap, Game Book

Game information

**First quarter**

- JAX – Chris Ivory 2-yard run (Jason Myers kick), 8:15. Jaguars 7–0. **Drive: 11 plays, 75 yards, 6:45.**

**Second quarter**

- BUF – LeSean McCoy 7-yard run (kick failed), 0:20. Jaguars 7–6. **Drive: 5 plays, 22 yards, 1:04.**

**Third quarter**

- BUF – LeSean McCoy 75-yard run (Dan Carpenter kick), 14:47. Bills 7–13. **Drive: 1 play, 75 yards, 0:13.**
- JAX – Marqise Lee 20-yard pass from Blake Bortles (Jason Myers kick), 9:26. Jaguars 14–13. **Drive: 11 plays, 65 yards, 5:21.**
- BUF – Tyrod Taylor 7-yard run (Dan Carpenter kick), 3:00. Bills 20–14. **Drive: 4 plays, 75 yards, 1:34.**

**Fourth quarter**

- JAX – Allen Hurns 12-yard pass from Blake Bortles (Jason Myers kick), 14:52. Jaguars 21–20. **Drive: 7 plays, 65 yards, 3:08.**
- BUF – Justin Hunter 16-yard pass from Tyrod Taylor (run succeeded), 10:46. Bills 28–21. **Drive: 8 plays, 76 yards, 4:06.**

**Top passers**

- JAX – Blake Bortles – 13/26, 126 yards, 2 TD
- BUF – Tyrod Taylor – 12/18, 166 yards, TD

**Top rushers**

- JAX – Blake Bortles – 8 rushes, 81 yards
- BUF – LeSean McCoy – 19 rushes, 103 yards, 2 TD

**Top receivers**

- JAX – Marqise Lee – 3 receptions, 37 yards, TD
- BUF – Sammy Watkins – 3 receptions, 80 yards

**Top tacklers**

- JAX – Telvin Smith – 7 tackles, 2 assists
- BUF – Preston Brown – 5 tackles, 7 assists

==== Week 13: vs. Denver Broncos ====
Week Thirteen: Denver Broncos at Jacksonville Jaguars – Game summary

Quarter	1	2	3	4	Total
**Broncos**	0	10	7	3	**20**
Jaguars	0	3	0	7	**10**

at EverBank Field, Jacksonville, Florida

- Date: December 4, 2016
- Game time: 1:00 p.m. EST
- Game weather: 70 °F (21 °C)
- Game attendance: 63,075
- Referee: Craig Wrolstad
- TV announcers (CBS): Spero Dedes and Solomon Wilcots
- Recap, Game Book

Game information

**First quarter**

- No scoring plays.

**Second quarter**

- JAX – Jason Myers 47-yard field goal, 11:01. Jaguars 3–0. **Drive: 7 plays, 30 yards, 3:08.**
- DEN – Devontae Booker 6-yard run (Brandon McManus kick), 6:54. Broncos 7–3. **Drive: 8 plays, 75 yards, 4:07.**
- DEN – Brandon McManus 32-yard field goal, 0:01. Broncos 10–3. **Drive: 4 plays, 29 yards, 0:46.**

**Third quarter**

- DEN – Bradley Roby 51-yard interception return (Brandon McManus kick), 7:34. Broncos 17–3.

**Fourth quarter**

- JAX – Blake Bortles 22-yard run (Jason Myers kick), 14:03. Broncos 17–10. **Drive: 12 plays, 70 yards, 5:45.**
- DEN – Brandon McManus 41-yard field goal, 0:29. Broncos 20–10. **Drive: 4 plays, 6 yards, 0:58.**

**Top passers**

- DEN – Paxton Lynch – 12/24, 104 yards
- JAX – Blake Bortles – 19/42, 181 yards, 2 INT

**Top rushers**

- DEN – Kapri Bibbs – 5 rushes, 49 yards
- JAX – T. J. Yeldon – 14 rushes, 55 yards

**Top receivers**

- DEN – Demaryius Thomas – 6 receptions, 61 yards
- JAX – Neal Sterling – 5 receptions, 43 yards

**Top tacklers**

- DEN – T. J. Ward – 6 tackles
- JAX – Paul Posluszny – 6 tackles

==== Week 14: vs. Minnesota Vikings ====
Week Fourteen: Minnesota Vikings at Jacksonville Jaguars – Game summary

Quarter	1	2	3	4	Total
**Vikings**	6	3	3	13	**25**
Jaguars	0	9	7	0	**16**

at EverBank Field, Jacksonville, Florida

- Date: December 11, 2016
- Game time: 1:00 p.m. EST
- Game weather: 71 °F (22 °C)
- Game attendance: 62,701
- Referee: John Hussey
- TV announcers (Fox): Kenny Albert, Daryl Johnston, and Laura Okmin
- Recap, Game Book

Game information

**First quarter**

- MIN – Kai Forbath 43-yard field goal, 12:20. Vikings 3–0. **Drive: 5 plays, 50 yards, 2:40.**
- MIN – Kai Forbath 32-yard field goal, 7:53. Vikings 6–0. **Drive: 5 plays, 45 yards, 2:35.**

**Second quarter**

- JAX – Jason Myers 45-yard field goal, 13:07. Vikings 6–3. **Drive: 8 plays, 34 yards, 3:00.**
- MIN – Kai Forbath 40-yard field goal, 10:49. Vikings 9–3. **Drive: 6 plays, 26 yards, 2:18.**
- JAX – Jason Myers 55-yard field goal, 6:18. Vikings 9–6. **Drive: 7 plays, 31 yards, 4:31.**
- JAX – Jason Myers 24-yard field goal, 0:09. Tied 9–9. **Drive: 10 plays, 92 yards, 1:47.**

**Third quarter**

- MIN – Kai Forbath 46-yard field goal, 8:29. Vikings 12–9. **Drive: 9 plays, 41 yards, 2:53.**
- JAX – Bryan Walters 14-yard pass from Blake Bortles (Jason Myers kick), 3:50. Jaguars 16–12. **Drive: 11 plays, 90 yards, 4:39.**

**Fourth quarter**

- MIN – Matt Asiata 1-yard run (kick failed, wide left), 14:13. Vikings 18–16. **Drive: 9 plays, 62 yards, 4:37.**
- MIN – Kyle Rudolph 3-yard pass from Sam Bradford (Kai Forbath kick), 2:13. Vikings 25–16. **Drive: 9 plays, 54 yards, 2:51.**

**Top passers**

- MIN – Sam Bradford – 24/34, 292 yards, 2 TD
- JAX – Blake Bortles – 23/37, 257 yards, TD

**Top rushers**

- MIN – Matt Asiata – 11 rushes, 37 yards, TD
- JAX – T. J. Yeldon – 17 rushes, 59 yards

**Top receivers**

- MIN – Adam Thielen – 4 receptions, 101 yards
- JAX – Marqise Lee – 5 receptions, 113 yards

**Top tacklers**

- MIN – Anthony Harris – 7 tackles
- JAX – Johnathan Cyprien – 10 tackles, 4 assists, 1 forced fumble

==== Week 15: at Houston Texans ====
Week Fifteen: Jacksonville Jaguars at Houston Texans – Game summary

Quarter	1	2	3	4	Total
Jaguars	0	13	7	0	**20**
**Texans**	0	5	6	10	**21**

at NRG Stadium, Houston, Texas

- Date: December 18, 2016
- Game time: 12:00 p.m. CST
- Game weather: None (retractable roof closed)
- Game attendance: 71,803
- Referee: Ed Hochuli
- TV announcers (CBS): Andrew Catalon, Steve Beuerlein, and Steve Tasker
- Recap, Game Book

Game information

**First quarter**

- No scoring plays.

**Second quarter**

- JAX – Jason Myers 26–yard field goal, 14:10. Jaguars 3–0. **Drive: 11 plays, 56 yards, 5:36.**
- JAX – Jason Myers 50–yard field goal, 11:12. Jaguars 6–0. **Drive: 4 plays, −7 yards, 1:38.**
- JAX – Blake Bortles 1–yard rush (Jason Myers kick), 8:39. Jaguars 13–0. **Drive: 4 plays, 37 yards, 1:30.**
- HOU – Penalty on Neal Sterling enforced in the end zone for a safety, 1:49. Jaguars 13–2. **Drive: 3 plays, −1 yard, 1:01.**
- HOU – Nick Novak 39–yard field goal, 0:53. Jaguars 13–5. **Drive: 6 plays, 40 yards, 0:46.**

**Third quarter**

- HOU – Nick Novak 45–yard field goal, 7:07. Jaguars 13–8. **Drive: 9 plays, 57 yards, 5:14.**
- JAX – Marqise Lee 100–yard kick return (Jason Myers kick), 7:02. Jaguars 20–8.
- HOU – Nick Novak 43–yard field goal, 0:15. Jaguars 20–11. **Drive: 9 plays, 45 yards, 3:15.**

**Fourth quarter**

- HOU – Nick Novak 27–yard field goal, 7:57. Jaguars 20–14. **Drive: 14 plays, 58 yards, 6:05.**
- HOU – Lamar Miller 1–yard run (Nick Novak kick), 2:52. Texans 21–20. **Drive: 8 plays, 52 yards, 2:56.**

**Top passers**

- JAX – Blake Bortles – 12/28, 92 yards, INT
- HOU – Tom Savage – 23/36, 260 yards

**Top rushers**

- JAX – Chris Ivory – 10 rushes, 44 yards
- HOU – Lamar Miller – 22 rushes, 63 yards, TD

**Top receivers**

- JAX – T. J. Yeldon – 5 receptions, 34 yards
- HOU – DeAndre Hopkins – 8 receptions, 87 yards

**Top tacklers**

- JAX – Johnathan Cyprien – 13 tackles, 4 assists
- HOU – Jadeveon Clowney – 4 tackles, 1 assist, 1 sack

==== Week 16: vs. Tennessee Titans ====
Week Sixteen: Tennessee Titans at Jacksonville Jaguars – Game summary

Quarter	1	2	3	4	Total
Titans	0	7	3	7	**17**
**Jaguars**	10	9	6	13	**38**

at EverBank Field, Jacksonville, Florida

- Date: December 24, 2016
- Game time: 1:00 p.m. EST
- Game weather: 67 °F (19 °C)
- Game attendance: 59,621
- Referee: Pete Morelli
- TV announcers (CBS): Andrew Catalon, Steve Beuerlein, Steve Tasker, and Chris Fischer
- Recap, Game Book

Game information

**First quarter**

- JAX – Marqise Lee 21-yard pass from Blake Bortles (Jason Myers kick), 11:03. Jaguars 7–0. **Drive: 8 plays, 75 yards, 3:57.**
- JAX – Jason Myers 29-yard field goal, 4:03. Jaguars 10–0. **Drive: 11 plays, 63 yards, 5:30.**

**Second quarter**

- TEN – Rishard Matthews 3-yard pass from Marcus Mariota (Ryan Succop kick), 8:59. Jaguars 10–7. **Drive: 10 plays, 69 yards, 6:01.**
- JAX – Chris Ivory 1-yard run (kick failed, wide right), 1:57. Jaguars 16–7. **Drive: 12 plays, 75 yards, 7:02.**
- JAX – Jason Myers 48-yard field goal, 0:11. Jaguars 19–7. **Drive: 8 plays, 48 yards, 0:58.**

**Third quarter**

- TEN – Ryan Succop 42-yard field goal, 12:24. Jaguars 19–10. **Drive: 4 plays, 2 yards, 0:59.**
- JAX – Jason Myers 56-yard field goal, 8:13. Jaguars 22–10. **Drive: 10 plays, 37 yards, 4:11.**
- JAX – Jason Myers 50-yard field goal, 2:59. Jaguars 25–10. **Drive: 7 plays, 45 yards, 3:02.**

**Fourth quarter**

- TEN – Delanie Walker 14-yard pass from Matt Cassel (Ryan Succop kick), 8:42. Jaguars 25–17. **Drive: 8 plays, 50 yards, 5:24.**
- JAX – Blake Bortles 20-yard pass from Marqise Lee (kick failed), 5:25. Jaguars 31–17. **Drive: 6 plays, 75 yards, 3:17.**
- JAX – Jalen Ramsey 30-yard interception return (Jason Myers kick), 5:17. Jaguars 38–17.

**Top passers**

- TEN – Matt Cassel – 13/24, 124 yards, TD, INT
- JAX – Blake Bortles – 26/38, 325 yards, TD

**Top rushers**

- TEN – DeMarco Murray – 14 rushes, 42 yards
- JAX – Chris Ivory – 14 rushes, 45 yards, TD

**Top receivers**

- TEN – Harry Douglas – 5 receptions, 48 yards
- JAX – Allen Robinson – 9 receptions, 147 yards

**Top tacklers**

- TEN – Valentino Blake – 8 tackles, 1 assist
- JAX – Paul Posluszny – 7 tackles, 2 assists

==== Week 17: at Indianapolis Colts ====
Week Seventeen: Jacksonville Jaguars at Indianapolis Colts – Game summary

Quarter	1	2	3	4	Total
Jaguars	10	7	0	3	**20**
**Colts**	0	3	14	7	**24**

at Lucas Oil Stadium, Indianapolis, Indiana

- Date: January 1, 2017
- Game time: 1:00 p.m. EST
- Game weather: None (retractable roof closed)
- Game attendance: 65,160
- Referee: Clete Blakeman
- TV announcers (CBS): Spero Dedes and Solomon Wilcots
- Recap, Game Book

Game information

**First quarter**

- JAX – Jason Myers 47-yard field goal, 10:11. Jaguars 3–0. **Drive: 7 plays, 57 yards, 3:30.**
- JAX – Ben Koyack 14-yard pass from Blake Bortles (Jason Myers kick), 6:03. Jaguars 10–0. **Drive: 7 plays, 75 yards, 3:09.**

**Second quarter**

- JAX – Corey Grant 57-yard run (Jason Myers kick), 5:57. Jaguars 17–0. **Drive: 2 plays, 62 yards, 0:48.**
- IND – Adam Vinatieri 45-yard field goal, 2:46. Jaguars 17–3. **Drive: 8 plays, 48 yards, 3:04.**

**Third quarter**

- IND – Robert Turbin 7-yard run (Adam Vinatieri kick), 10:22. Jaguars 17–10. **Drive: 5 plays, 83 yards, 2:35.**
- IND – Dwayne Allen 15-yard pass from Andrew Luck (Adam Vinatieri kick), 0:19. Tied 17–17. **Drive: 12 plays, 89 yards, 6:43.**

**Fourth quarter**

- JAX – Jason Myers 41-yard field goal, 1:38. Jaguars 20–17. **Drive: 4 plays, 7 yards, 0:21.**
- IND – Jack Doyle 1-yard pass from Andrew Luck (Adam Vinatieri kick), 0:14. Colts 24–20. **Drive: 8 plays, 75 yards, 1:24.**

**Top passers**

- JAX – Blake Bortles – 25/39, 301 yards, TD
- IND – Andrew Luck – 24/40, 321 yards, 2 TD, INT

**Top rushers**

- JAX – Corey Grant – 18 rushes, 122 yards, TD
- IND – Frank Gore – 16 rushes, 62 yards

**Top receivers**

- JAX – Marqise Lee – 6 receptions, 86 yards
- IND – T. Y. Hilton – 6 receptions, 95 yards

**Top tacklers**

- JAX – Telvin Smith – 8 tackles, 1 assist, INT
- IND – Edwin Jackson – 6 tackles

=== Standings ===
==== Division ====
AFC South
	W	L	T	PCT	DIV	CONF	PF	PA	STK
^{(4)} Houston Texans	9	7	0	.563	5–1	7–5	279	328	L1
Tennessee Titans	9	7	0	.563	2–4	6–6	381	378	W1
Indianapolis Colts	8	8	0	.500	3–3	5–7	411	392	W1
Jacksonville Jaguars	3	13	0	.188	2–4	2–10	318	400	L1

==== Conference ====
AFC
#	Team	Division	W	L	T	PCT	DIV	CONF	SOS	SOV	STK
**Division leaders**
1	New England Patriots	East	14	2	0	.875	5–1	11–1	.439	.424	W7
2 (Note: Kansas City clinched the AFC West division over Oakland based on head-to-head sweep.)	Kansas City Chiefs	West	12	4	0	.750	6–0	9–3	.508	.479	W2
3	Pittsburgh Steelers	North	11	5	0	.688	5–1	9–3	.494	.423	W7
4 (Note: Houston clinched the AFC South division title over Tennessee based on record vs. division opponents.)	Houston Texans	South	9	7	0	.563	5–1	7–5	.502	.427	L1
**Wild Cards**
5	Oakland Raiders	West	12	4	0	.750	3–3	9–3	.504	.443	L1
6	Miami Dolphins	East	10	6	0	.625	4–2	7–5	.455	.341	L1
**Did not qualify for the postseason**
7 (Note: Tennessee finished ahead of Denver based on head-to-head victory.)	Tennessee Titans	South	9	7	0	.563	2–4	6–6	.465	.458	W1
8	Denver Broncos	West	9	7	0	.563	2–4	6–6	.549	.455	W1
9 (Note: Baltimore finished ahead of Indianapolis based on record vs. conference opponents.)	Baltimore Ravens	North	8	8	0	.500	4–2	7–5	.498	.363	L2
10	Indianapolis Colts	South	8	8	0	.500	3–3	5–7	.492	.406	W1
11	Buffalo Bills	East	7	9	0	.438	1–5	4–8	.482	.339	L2
12	Cincinnati Bengals	North	6	9	1	.406	3–3	5–7	.521	.333	W1
13 (Note: The New York Jets finished ahead of San Diego based record vs. common opponents — the Jets' cumulative record against Cleveland, Indianapolis, Kansas City and Miami was 1–4, while San Diego's cumulative record against the same four teams was 0–5.)	New York Jets	East	5	11	0	.313	2–4	4–8	.518	.313	W1
14	San Diego Chargers	West	5	11	0	.313	1–5	4–8	.543	.513	L5
15	Jacksonville Jaguars	South	3	13	0	.188	2–4	2–10	.527	.417	L1
16	Cleveland Browns	North	1	15	0	.063	0–6	1–11	.549	.313	L1
**Tiebreakers** (Note: When breaking ties for three or more teams under the NFL's rules, they are first broken within divisions, then comparing only the highest ranked remaining team from each division.)
