= 2016 Indianapolis Colts season =

64th season in franchise history

- Owner: Jim Irsay
- General manager: Ryan Grigson
- Head coach: Chuck Pagano
- Home stadium: Lucas Oil Stadium

Results
- Record: 8–8
- Division place: 3rd AFC South
- Playoffs: Did not qualify
- Pro Bowlers: WR T. Y. Hilton; P Pat McAfee

Uniform
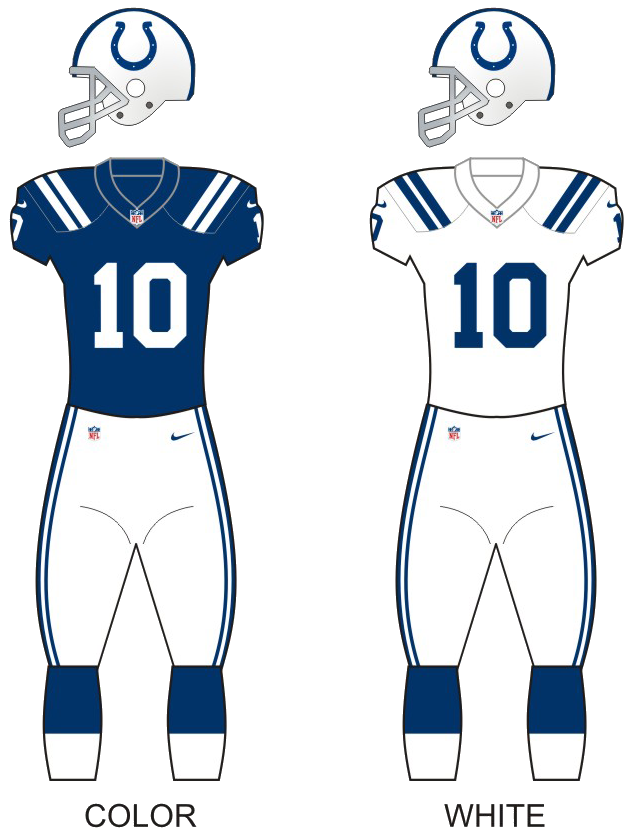

The 2016 season was the Indianapolis Colts' 64th in the National Football League (NFL), their 33rd in Indianapolis, and their ninth playing their home games at Lucas Oil Stadium. The Colts matched their 8–8 record from 2015, but missed the playoffs in consecutive seasons for the first time since 1997–1998. This season also saw the Colts swept by the Houston Texans for the first time in franchise history. As a result, the Colts fired general manager Ryan Grigson after five seasons with the team, although head coach Chuck Pagano returned the next year.

== Roster changes ==
=== Free agents ===
Position	Player	Tag	2016 Team	Notes
TE	Coby Fleener	UFA	New Orleans Saints	Signed 5-year/$36 million deal
TE	Dwayne Allen	UFA	Indianapolis Colts	Signed 4-year/$29.4 million deal
TE	Jack Doyle	RFA	Indianapolis Colts	Signed 1-year/$1.67 million tender
QB	Charlie Whitehurst	UFA	Cleveland Browns	
QB	Matt Hasselbeck	UFA	Retired	
RB	Ahmad Bradshaw	UFA	TBA	
RB	Dan Herron	RFA	Buffalo Bills	
K	Adam Vinatieri	UFA	Indianapolis Colts	Signed 2-year/$6 million deal
G	Lance Louis	UFA	TBA	
S	Akeem Davis	ERFA	Indianapolis Colts	Signed 1-year/$600,000 tender
S	Dwight Lowery	UFA	San Diego Chargers	Signed 3-year/$7.2 million deal
S	Colt Anderson	UFA	Buffalo Bills	Signed 1-year/$840,000 deal
CB	Greg Toler	UFA	Washington Redskins	Signed 1-year/$840,000 deal
DE	Billy Winn	UFA	Denver Broncos	
ILB	Jerrell Freeman	UFA	Chicago Bears	Signed 3-year/$12 million deal

Player re-signed by the Colts	Player signed with a different team	Player retired

=== Undrafted free agents ===
Position	Player	College	Notes
Wide receiver	Danny Anthrop	Purdue	
Defensive lineman	Sterling Bailey	Georgia	
Kicker/Punter	Devon Bell	Mississippi State	Camp tryout
Offensive tackle	Isiah Cage	Wisconsin–Eau Claire	
Nose tackle	Julian Campenni	Connecticut	Camp tryout
Linebacker	Henry Coley	Virginia	Camp tryout
Cornerback	Daniel Davie	Nebraska	
Long snapper	Harrison Elliott	Air Force	Camp tryout
Running back	Josh Ferguson	Illinois	
Quarterback	Blake Frohnapfel	Massachusetts	Camp tryout
Quarterback	Everett Golson	Florida State	Camp tryout
Tight end	Darion Griswold	Arkansas	
Offensive tackle	Davante Harris	Appalachian State	
Long snapper	Forrest Hill	Auburn	Camp tryout
Safety	Tigi Hill	Hawaii	Camp tryout
Wide receiver	Reece Horn	Indianapolis	Camp tryout
Offensive tackle	Amadou Konte	Benedictine	Camp tryout
Wide receiver	Marcus Leak	Maryland	
Linebacker	Curt Maggitt	Tennessee	
Safety	Stefan McClure	California	
Wide receiver	Mekale McKay	Cincinnati	
Punter	Brock Miller	Southern Utah	Camp tryout
Tight end	Mike Miller	Taylor	
Cornerback	Christopher Milton	Georgia Tech	
Offensive guard	Jamelle Naff	TCU	Camp tryout
Outside linebacker	Elhadji Ndiaye	Nebraska–Kearney	Camp tryout
Outside linebacker	Eze Obiora	Southern Illinois	Camp tryout
Quarterback	Ammon Olsen	Southern Utah	Camp tryout
Cornerback	Leviticus Payne	Cincinnati	Camp tryout
Linebacker	Terrance Plummer	UCF	Camp tryout
Running back	Chase Price	San Diego State	Camp tryout
Offensive tackle	Adam Redmond	Harvard	
Wide receiver	Chester Rogers	Grambling State	
Linebacker	Anthony Sarao	USC	
Defensive lineman	Delvon Simmons	USC	
Wide receiver	Tevaun Smith	Iowa	
Wide receiver	Logan Sweet	UCLA	Camp tryout
Defensive lineman	Justin Thomason	North Carolina	Camp tryout
Outside Linebacker	Ron Thompson	Syracuse	$15,000 bonus
Cornerback	Darius White	California, Berkeley	
Cornerback	Frankie Williams	Purdue	Camp tryout, Signed
Safety	Andrew Williamson	Vanderbilt	
Running back	Storm Woods	Oregon State	Camp tryout

== Draft ==
2016 Indianapolis Colts Draft
Round	Selection	Player	Position	College
1	18	Ryan Kelly	Center	Alabama
2	57	T. J. Green	Free safety	Clemson
3	82	Le'Raven Clark	Offensive tackle	Texas Tech
4	116	Hassan Ridgeway	Nose tackle	Texas
4	125	Antonio Morrison	Inside linebacker	Florida
5	155	Joe Haeg	Offensive tackle	North Dakota State
7	239	Trevor Bates	Outside linebacker	Maine
7	248	Austin Blythe	Center	Iowa

Notes

- The Colts traded their sixth-round selection to the Oakland Raiders in exchange for linebacker Sio Moore.

== Staff ==
2016 Indianapolis Colts staff
Front office: Owner/CEO – Jim Irsay; General manager – Ryan Grigson; Vice president of football operations – Jimmy Raye III; Director of college scouting – T. J. McCreight; Senior player personnel scout – Todd Vasvari; Director of football administration – Mike Bluem; Director of pro personnel – Kevin Rogers Jr.; Assistant director of college scouting – Matt Tarpening; Head coaches: Head coach – Chuck Pagano; Assistant head coach/offensive line – Joe Philbin; Assistant to the head coach – Jeff Popovich; Offensive coaches: Offensive coordinator – Rob Chudzinski; Quarterbacks – Brian Schottenheimer; Running backs – Jemal Singleton; Wide receivers – Lee Hull; Tight ends – Jim Hostler; Assistant offensive line – Joe Gilbert; Offensive assistant/assistant quarterbacks coach – Tim Berbenich; Offensive quality control – Frank Giufre	Defensive coaches: Defensive coordinator – Ted Monachino; Defensive line – Gary Emanuel; Linebackers – Jim Herrmann; Outside linebackers – Brad White; Secondary – Greg Williams; Defensive quality control – Shawn Terlecky; Special teams coaches: Special teams coordinator – Tom McMahon; Assistant special teams – Maurice Drayton; Strength and conditioning: Strength and conditioning – Darren Krein; Assistant strength and conditioning – Richard Howell; Conditioning & performance analyst – Quadrian Banks

== Final roster ==
2016 Indianapolis Colts roster
Quarterbacks (QB): 12 Andrew Luck; 16 Scott Tolzien; Running backs (RB): 34 Josh Ferguson; 23 Frank Gore; 28 Jordan Todman; 33 Robert Turbin; Wide receivers (WR): 15 Phillip Dorsett; 13 T. Y. Hilton; 10 Donte Moncrief; 80 Chester Rogers; 81 Devin Street; Tight ends (TE): 83 Dwayne Allen; 84 Jack Doyle; 86 Erik Swoope	Offensive linemen (OL): 63 Austin Blythe; 74 Anthony Castonzo T; 62 Le'Raven Clark T; 71 Denzelle Good G; 73 Joe Haeg G/T; 72 Jonotthan Harrison G/C; 78 Ryan Kelly C; 76 Joe Reitz T; 67 Jeremy Vujnovich T; Defensive linemen (DL): 96 Henry Anderson DE; 58 Trent Cole DE; 94 Zach Kerr DT; 98 Robert Mathis DE; 99 T. Y. McGill DT; 54 David Parry DT; 91 Hassan Ridgeway DE; 65 Kristjan Sokoli DE	Linebackers (LB): 56 Akeem Ayers OLB; 43 Chris Carter OLB; 53 Edwin Jackson OLB; 50 Deon King MLB; 57 Josh McNary OLB; 44 Antonio Morrison MLB; 48 Deiontrez Mount OLB; 46 Luke Rhodes OLB; 93 Erik Walden OLB; Defensive backs (DB): 29 Mike Adams SS; 20 Darius Butler CB/FS; 21 Vontae Davis CB; 41 Matthias Farley SS; 32 T. J. Green S; 38 Charles James CB; 30 Rashaan Melvin CB; 40 Christopher Milton CB; 35 Darryl Morris CB; 31 Duke Williams SS; Special teams (ST): 1 Pat McAfee P; 45 Matt Overton LS; 4 Adam Vinatieri K	Practice squad: 73 Pierce Burton T; 95 Lavar Edwards DE; 14 Marcus Leak WR; 42 Stefan McClure SS; 85 Mike Miller TE (IR); 27 Tevin Mitchel CB; 7 Stephen Morris QB; 68 Kitt O'Brien G; 64 Kelcy Quarles DT; 61 Adam Redmond C; 17 Tevaun Smith WR; Reserve: 11 Quan Bray WR (IR); 60 Isiah Cage T (IR); 26 Clayton Geathers FS (IR); 52 D'Qwell Jackson MLB (Susp.); 97 Arthur Jones DT (IR); 90 Kendall Langford DE (IR); 92 Curt Maggitt OLB (IR); 75 Jack Mewhort G (IR); 25 Patrick Robinson CB (IR); 69 Hugh Thornton G (IR); 37 Frankie Williams CB (NF-Inj.); 36 Andrew Williamson FS (IR); Rookies in italics 53 active, 13 reserve, 10 practice squad

== Schedule ==
=== Preseason ===
On February 16, the NFL announced that the Colts would play the Green Bay Packers in the Pro Football Hall of Fame Game. The game would have occurred on Sunday, August 7, at Tom Benson Hall of Fame Stadium in Canton, Ohio, but the game was cancelled due to field conditions. However, the two teams met during the regular season in Green Bay.

The remainder of the Colts' preseason opponents and schedule were later announced on April 7.

Week	Date	Opponent	Result	Record	Venue	Recap
HOF	August 7	vs. Green Bay Packers	Cancelled due to field conditions			
1	August 13	at Buffalo Bills	**W** 19–18	1–0	Ralph Wilson Stadium	Recap
2	August 20	Baltimore Ravens	**L** 18–19	1–1	Lucas Oil Stadium	Recap
3	August 27	Philadelphia Eagles	**L** 23–33	1–2	Lucas Oil Stadium	Recap
4	September 1	at Cincinnati Bengals	**W** 13–10	2–2	Paul Brown Stadium	Recap

=== Regular season ===
Week	Date	Opponent	Result	Record	Venue	Recap
1	September 11	Detroit Lions	**L** 35–39	0–1	Lucas Oil Stadium	Recap
2	September 18	at Denver Broncos	**L** 20–34	0–2	Sports Authority Field at Mile High	Recap
3	September 25	San Diego Chargers	**W** 26–22	1–2	Lucas Oil Stadium	Recap
4	October 2	at **Jacksonville Jaguars**	**L** 27–30	1–3	(United Kingdom) Wembley Stadium (London)	Recap
5	October 9	Chicago Bears	**W** 29–23	2–3	Lucas Oil Stadium	Recap
6	October 16	at **Houston Texans**	**L** 23–26 (OT)	2–4	NRG Stadium	Recap
7	October 23	at **Tennessee Titans**	**W** 34–26	3–4	Nissan Stadium	Recap
8	October 30	Kansas City Chiefs	**L** 14–30	3–5	Lucas Oil Stadium	Recap
9	November 6	at Green Bay Packers	**W** 31–26	4–5	Lambeau Field	Recap
10	Bye					
11	November 20	**Tennessee Titans**	**W** 24–17	5–5	Lucas Oil Stadium	Recap
12	November 24	Pittsburgh Steelers	**L** 7–28	5–6	Lucas Oil Stadium	Recap
13	December 5	at New York Jets	**W** 41–10	6–6	MetLife Stadium	Recap
14	December 11	**Houston Texans**	**L** 17–22	6–7	Lucas Oil Stadium	Recap
15	December 18	at Minnesota Vikings	**W** 34–6	7–7	U.S. Bank Stadium	Recap
16	December 24	at Oakland Raiders	**L** 25–33	7–8	Oakland–Alameda County Coliseum	Recap
17	January 1	**Jacksonville Jaguars**	**W** 24–20	8–8	Lucas Oil Stadium	Recap

Note: Intra-division opponents are in bold text.

=== Game summaries ===
==== Week 1: vs. Detroit Lions ====
Week One: Detroit Lions at Indianapolis Colts – Game summary

Quarter	1	2	3	4	Total
**Lions**	7	14	7	11	**39**
Colts	0	10	8	17	**35**

at Lucas Oil Stadium, Indianapolis, Indiana

- Date: September 11
- Game time: 4:25 p.m. EDT
- Game weather: 76 °F (24 °C), partly sunny — retractable roof open
- Game attendance: 65,566
- Referee: Ed Hochuli
- TV announcers (Fox): Kenny Albert (play-by-play), Daryl Johnston (color commentator) and Laura Okmin (sideline reporter)
- Recap, Gamebook

Game information

**First quarter**

- DET – Theo Riddick 21-yard run (Matt Prater kick), 4:43. Lions 7–0. **Drive: 9 plays, 80 yards, 4:23.**

**Second quarter**

- DET – Dwayne Washington 1-yard run (Matt Prater kick), 9:11. Lions 14–0. **Drive: 15 plays, 82 yards, 7:00.**
- IND – Adam Vinatieri 50-yard field goal, 4:50. Lions 14–3. **Drive: 8 plays, 47 yards, 4:21.**
- DET – Eric Ebron 6-yard pass from Matthew Stafford (Matt Prater kick), 1:37. Lions 21–3. **Drive: 8 plays, 75 yards, 3:13.**
- IND – Donte Moncrief 2-yard pass from Andrew Luck (Adam Vinatieri kick), 0:05. Lions 21–10. **Drive: 8 plays, 75 yards, 1:32.**

**Third quarter**

- IND – Dwayne Allen 19-yard pass from Andrew Luck (Andrew Luck–Dwayne Allen pass), 8:41. Lions 21–18. **Drive: 9 plays, 85 yards, 4:00.**
- DET – Ameer Abdullah 11-yard pass from Matthew Stafford (Matt Prater kick), 2:20. Lions 28–18. **Drive: 7 plays, 71 yards, 3:36.**

**Fourth quarter**

- IND – Adam Vinatieri 40-yard field goal, 14:17. Lions 28–21. **Drive: 10 plays, 53 yards, 3:03.**
- IND – Jack Doyle 16-yard pass from Andrew Luck (Adam Vinatieri kick), 8:19. Tied 28–28. **Drive: 9 plays, 94 yards, 4:19.**
- DET – Theo Riddick 13-yard pass from Matthew Stafford (kick failed, wide right), 4:04. Lions 34–28. **Drive: 8 plays, 75 yards, 4:15.**
- IND – Jack Doyle 6-yard pass from Andrew Luck (Adam Vinatieri kick), 0:37. Colts 35–34. **Drive: 8 plays, 75 yards, 3:27.**
- DET – Matt Prater 43-yard field goal, 0:04. Lions 37–35. **Drive: 5 plays, 50 yards, 0:33.**
- DET – Penalty on T. Y. Hilton enforced in the end zone for a safety, 0:00. Lions 39–35.

**Top passers**

- DET – Matthew Stafford – 31/39, 340 yards, 3 TD
- IND – Andrew Luck – 31/47, 385 yards, 4 TD

**Top rushers**

- DET – Ameer Abdullah – 12 rushes, 63 yards
- IND – Frank Gore – 14 rushes, 59 yards

**Top receivers**

- DET – Golden Tate – 7 receptions, 41 yards
- IND – T. Y. Hilton – 6 receptions, 79 yards

Andrew Luck would march the Colts down the field and score with 39 seconds remaining, but the Lions were able to pull out the win on a field goal by Matt Prater with 4 seconds left. The Colts would try the lateral play on the ensuing kickoff, but it would result in a safety. With the loss, the Colts started 0–1.

==== Week 2: at Denver Broncos ====
Week Two: Indianapolis Colts at Denver Broncos – Game summary

Quarter	1	2	3	4	Total
Colts	3	3	7	7	**20**
**Broncos**	3	10	3	18	**34**

at Sports Authority Field at Mile High, Denver, Colorado

- Date: September 18
- Game time: 4:25 p.m. EDT/2:25 p.m. MDT
- Game weather: 85 °F (29 °C), sunny
- Game attendance: 76,379
- Referee: Walt Coleman
- TV announcers (CBS): Jim Nantz (play-by-play), Phil Simms (color commentator) and Tracy Wolfson (sideline reporter)
- Recap, Gamebook

Game information

**First quarter**

- IND – Adam Vinatieri 48-yard field goal, 8:17. Colts 3–0. **Drive: 7 plays, 26 yards, 3:24.**
- DEN – Brandon McManus 23-yard field goal, 5:30. Tied 3–3. **Drive: 7 plays, 70 yards, 2:47.**

**Second quarter**

- DEN – C. J. Anderson 4-yard run (Brandon McManus kick), 11:41. Broncos 10–3. **Drive: 6 plays, 69 yards, 3:19.**
- IND – Adam Vinatieri 52-yard field goal, 2:43. Broncos 10–6. **Drive: 9 plays, 21 yards, 3:36.**
- DEN – Brandon McManus 43-yard field goal, 0:05. Broncos 13–6. **Drive: 11 plays, 50 yards, 2:38.**

**Third quarter**

- IND – Robert Turbin 5-yard run (Adam Vinatieri kick), 8:06. Tied 13–13. **Drive: 13 plays, 79 yards, 6:54.**
- DEN – Brandon McManus 33-yard field goal, 1:09. Broncos 16–13. **Drive: 13 plays, 60 yards, 6:57.**

**Fourth quarter**

- DEN – Aqib Talib 46-yard interception return (Brandon McManus kick), 13:52. Broncos 23–13.
- IND – Frank Gore 7-yard pass from Andrew Luck (Adam Vinatieri kick), 4:02. Broncos 23–20. **Drive: 12 plays, 80 yards, 5:28.**
- DEN – Brandon McManus 35-yard field goal, 1:51. Broncos 26–20. **Drive: 8 plays, 58 yards, 2:11.**
- DEN – Shane Ray 15-yard fumble return (Trevor Siemian–Demaryius Thomas pass), 1:42. Broncos 34–20.

**Top passers**

- IND – Andrew Luck – 21/40, 197 yards, TD, INT
- DEN – Trevor Siemian – 22/33, 266 yards, INT

**Top rushers**

- IND – Frank Gore – 13 rushes, 44 yards
- DEN – C. J. Anderson – 20 rushes, 74 yards, TD

**Top receivers**

- IND – Josh Ferguson – 5 receptions, 29 yards
- DEN – Demaryius Thomas – 5 receptions, 90 yards

It was only a 3–3 game at the end of 1 quarter before CJ Anderson scored a 4-yard touchdown to take a 7-point lead. The teams would trade field goals to end the half with a 13–6 advantage for the Broncos. Robert Turbin would score a touchdown from 5 yards out to tie the game at 13. But from there, it was basically all Denver. Indy was outscored 21–7 after Turbin's touchdown, including a pick six by Aqib Talib and a scoop and score by Shane Ray off a Von Miller strip sack of Andrew Luck. Brandon McManus would also kick two field goals in that stretch as the Broncos advanced to 2–0 and the Colts fell to 0–2.

==== Week 3: vs. San Diego Chargers ====
Week Three: San Diego Chargers at Indianapolis Colts – Game summary

Quarter	1	2	3	4	Total
Chargers	0	13	6	3	**22**
**Colts**	10	3	7	6	**26**

at Lucas Oil Stadium, Indianapolis, Indiana

- Date: September 25
- Game time: 4:25 p.m. EDT
- Game weather: Played indoors (retractable roof closed)
- Game attendance: 64,747
- Referee: Ronald Torbert
- TV announcers (CBS): Kevin Harlan (play-by-play) and Rich Gannon (color commentator)
- Recap, Gamebook

Game information

**First quarter**

- IND – Adam Vinatieri 38-yard field goal, 8:53. Colts 3–0. **Drive: 11 plays, 58 yards, 6:07.**
- IND – Frank Gore 6-yard run (Adam Vinatieri kick), 3:39. Colts 10–0. **Drive: 9 plays, 85 yards, 3:25.**

**Second quarter**

- SD – Josh Lambo 42-yard field goal, 14:51. Colts 10–3. **Drive: 10 plays, 50 yards, 3:48.**
- SD – Josh Lambo 34-yard field goal, 14:04. Colts 10–6. **Drive: 4 plays, −10 yards, 0:32.**
- IND – Adam Vinatieri 33-yard field goal, 6:25. Colts 13–6. **Drive: 11 plays, 60 yards, 7:39.**
- SD – Caraun Reid 61-yard fumble return (Josh Lambo kick), 0:55. Tied 13–13.

**Third quarter**

- SD – Melvin Gordon 1-yard run (kick blocked), 8:23. Chargers 19–13. **Drive: 12 plays, 80 yards, 6:37.**
- IND – Robert Turbin 1-yard run (Adam Vinatieri kick), 2:39. Colts 20–19. **Drive: 10 plays, 75 yards, 5:44.**

**Fourth quarter**

- SD – Josh Lambo 27-yard field goal, 7:34. Chargers 22–20. **Drive: 9 plays, 73 yards, 4:25.**
- IND – T. Y. Hilton 63-yard pass from Andrew Luck (pass failed), 1:17. Colts 26–22. **Drive: 6 plays, 83 yards, 1:12.**

**Top passers**

- SD – Philip Rivers – 26/39, 330 yards
- IND – Andrew Luck – 24/37, 331 yards, TD, INT

**Top rushers**

- SD – Melvin Gordon – 16 rushes, 35 yards, TD
- IND – Frank Gore – 21 rushes, 82 yards, TD

**Top receivers**

- SD – Tyrell Williams – 6 receptions, 69 yards
- IND – T. Y. Hilton – 8 receptions, 174 yards, TD

Although the Colts took an early lead in the first quarter, the Chargers kept the game close and a Josh Lambo field goal put them ahead midway through the fourth quarter; however, a 63-yard pass from Andrew Luck to T. Y. Hilton restored the Colts' advantage with less than a minute remaining, giving them their first win of the season. With the win, the Colts improved to 1–2.

==== Week 4: at Jacksonville Jaguars ====
NFL International Series

Week Four: Indianapolis Colts at Jacksonville Jaguars – Game summary

Quarter	1	2	3	4	Total
Colts	3	3	0	21	**27**
**Jaguars**	7	10	6	7	**30**

at Wembley Stadium, London, England

- Date: October 2
- Game time: 2:30 p.m. BST/9:30 a.m. EDT
- Game weather: 59 °F (15 °C), sunny intervals
- Game attendance: 83,764
- Referee: Walt Anderson
- TV announcers (CBS): Greg Gumbel, Trent Green and Jamie Erdahl
- Recap, Gamebook

Game information

**First quarter**

- JAX – Allen Robinson 3-yard pass from Blake Bortles (Jason Myers kick), 8:23. Jaguars 7–0. **Drive: 5 plays, 24 yards, 2:10.**
- IND – Adam Vinatieri 53-yard field goal, 1:50. Jaguars 7–3. **Drive: 12 plays, 29 yards, 6:33.**

**Second quarter**

- IND – Adam Vinatieri 49-yard field goal, 8:53. Jaguars 7–6. **Drive: 11 plays, 44 yards, 6:10.**
- JAX – Blake Bortles 1-yard run (Jason Myers kick), 4:59. Jaguars 14–6.**Drive: 10 plays, 75 yards, 4:44.**
- JAX – Jason Myers 22-yard field goal, 0:00. Jaguars 17–6. **Drive: 8 plays, 75 yards, 1:06.**

**Third quarter**

- JAX – Jason Myers 46-yard field goal, 11:50. Jaguars 20–6. **Drive: 9 plays, 43 yards, 3:10.**
- JAX – Jason Myers 49-yard field goal, 2:51. Jaguars 23–6. **Drive: 14 plays, 58 yards, 6:48.**

**Fourth quarter**

- IND – Frank Gore 1-yard run (Adam Vinatieri kick), 14:48. Jaguars 23–13. **Drive: 9 plays, 75 yards, 3:03.**
- IND – T. Y. Hilton 2-yard pass from Andrew Luck (Adam Vinatieri kick), 7:06. Jaguars 23–20. **Drive: 12 plays, 78 yards, 5:31.**
- JAX – Allen Hurns 42-yard pass from Blake Bortles (Jason Myers kick), 5:03. Jaguars 30–20. **Drive: 4 plays, 75 yards, 2:03.**
- IND – Phillip Dorsett 64-yard pass from Andrew Luck (Adam Vinatieri kick), 3:03. Jaguars 30–27. **Drive: 6 plays, 75 yards, 2:00.**

**Top passers**

- IND – Andrew Luck – 27/42, 234 yards, 2 TD, INT
- JAX – Blake Bortles – 19/33, 207 yards, 2 TD

**Top rushers**

- IND – Frank Gore – 16 rushes, 68 yards, TD
- JAX – T. J. Yeldon – 14 rushes, 71 yards

**Top receivers**

- IND – T. Y. Hilton – 7 receptions, 42 yards, TD
- JAX – Allen Robinson – 5 receptions, 55 yards, TD

With the loss, the Colts fell to 1–3.

==== Week 5: vs. Chicago Bears ====
Week Five: Chicago Bears at Indianapolis Colts – Game summary

Quarter	1	2	3	4	Total
Bears	3	10	0	10	**23**
**Colts**	3	13	3	10	**29**

at Lucas Oil Stadium, Indianapolis, Indiana

- Date: October 9
- Game time: 1:00 p.m. EDT
- Game weather: 60 °F (16 °C), mostly sunny — retractable roof open
- Game attendance: 66,622
- Referee: John Hussey
- TV announcers (Fox): Joe Buck (play-by-play), Troy Aikman (color commentator) and Erin Andrews (sideline reporter)
- Recap, Gamebook

Game information

**First quarter**

- CHI – Connor Barth 35-yard field goal, 8:24. Bears 3–0. **Drive: 12 plays, 51 yards, 6:36.**
- IND – Adam Vinatieri 54-yard field goal, 5:10. Tied 3–3. **Drive: 8 plays, 45 yards, 3:14.**

**Second quarter**

- IND – Dwayne Allen 1-yard pass from Andrew Luck (Adam Vinatieri kick), 12:58. Colts 10–3. **Drive: 12 plays, 80 yards, 5:44.**
- CHI – Connor Barth 49-yard field goal, 8:22. Colts 10–6. **Drive: 8 plays, 44 yards, 4:36.**
- IND – Adam Vinatieri 53-yard field goal, 6:08. Colts 13–6. **Drive: 6 plays, 27 yards, 2:14.**
- CHI – Cameron Meredith 14-yard pass from Brian Hoyer (Connor Barth kick), 3:35. Tied 13–13. **Drive: 5 plays, 75 yards, 2:33.**
- IND – Adam Vinatieri 26-yard field goal, 0:11. Colts 16–13. **Drive: 11 plays, 67 yards, 3:24.**

**Third quarter**

- IND – Adam Vinatieri 41-yard field goal, 5:52. Colts 19–13. **Drive: 11 plays, 45 yards, 5:08.**

**Fourth quarter**

- CHI – Connor Barth 24-yard field goal, 13:31. Colts 19–16. **Drive: 9 plays, 78 yards, 4:15.**
- CHI – Jordan Howard 21-yard pass from Brian Hoyer (Connor Barth kick), 7:04. Bears 23–19. **Drive: 9 plays, 96 yards, 4:45.**
- IND – T. Y. Hilton 35-yard pass from Andrew Luck (Adam Vinatieri kick), 3:43. Colts 26–23. **Drive: 6 plays, 82 yards, 3:21.**
- IND – Adam Vinatieri 46-yard field goal, 2:28. Colts 29–23. **Drive: 4 plays, 1 yard, 1:01.**

**Top passers**

- CHI – Brian Hoyer – 33/43, 397 yards, 2 TD
- IND – Andrew Luck – 28/39, 322 yards, 2 TD

**Top rushers**

- CHI – Jordan Howard – 16 rushes, 118 yards
- IND – Frank Gore – 14 rushes, 75 yards

**Top receivers**

- CHI – Cameron Meredith – 9 receptions, 130 yards, TD
- IND – T. Y. Hilton – 10 receptions, 171 yards, TD

With the win, the Colts improved to 2–3.

==== Week 6: at Houston Texans ====
Week Six: Indianapolis Colts at Houston Texans – Game summary

Quarter	1	2	3	4	OT	Total
Colts	3	10	0	10	0	**23**
**Texans**	0	3	6	14	3	**26**

at NRG Stadium, Houston, Texas

- Date: October 16
- Game time: 8:30 p.m. EDT/7:30 p.m. CDT
- Game weather: Played indoors (retractable roof closed)
- Game attendance: 71,891
- Referee: Bill Vinovich
- TV announcers (NBC): Al Michaels (play-by-play), Cris Collinsworth (color commentator) and Michele Tafoya (sideline reporter)
- Recap, Gamebook

Game information

**First quarter**

- IND – Adam Vinatieri 41-yard field goal, 5:56. Colts 3–0. **Drive: 9 plays, 27 yards, 4:16.**

**Second quarter**

- IND – Jack Doyle 22-yard pass from Andrew Luck (Adam Vinatieri kick), 14:55. Colts 10–0. **Drive: 7 plays, 60 yards, 4:33.**
- IND – Adam Vinatieri 37-yard field goal, 6:55. Colts 13–0. **Drive: 10 plays, 74 yards, 5:12.**
- HOU – Nick Novak 27-yard field goal, 1:57. Colts 13–3. **Drive: 11 plays, 66 yards, 4:58.**

**Third quarter**

- HOU – Lamar Miller 1-yard run (kick failed, wide right), 7:06. Colts 13–9. **Drive: 10 plays, 82 yards, 5:13.**

**Fourth quarter**

- IND – Andrew Luck 14-yard run (Adam Vinatieri kick), 14:53. Colts 20–9. **Drive: 2 plays, 20 yards, 0:25.**
- IND – Adam Vinatieri 36-yard field goal, 7:04. Colts 23–9. **Drive: 10 plays, 66 yards, 5:17.**
- HOU – Lamar Miller 10-yard pass from Brock Osweiler (Nick Novak kick), 2:37. Colts 23–16. **Drive: 12 plays, 75 yards, 4:27.**
- HOU – C. J. Fiedorowicz 26-yard pass from Brock Osweiler (Nick Novak kick), 0:49. Tied 23–23. **Drive: 3 plays, 53 yards, 1:01.**

**Overtime**

- HOU – Nick Novak 33-yard field goal, 8:10. Texans 26–23. **Drive: 6 plays, 52 yards, 3:20.**

**Top passers**

- IND – Andrew Luck – 21/32, 252 yards, TD, INT
- HOU – Brock Osweiler – 25/39, 269 yards, 2 TD, INT

**Top rushers**

- IND – Frank Gore – 22 rushes, 106 yards
- HOU – Lamar Miller – 24 rushes, 149 yards, TD

**Top receivers**

- IND – Chester Rogers – 4 receptions, 63 yards
- HOU – DeAndre Hopkins – 9 receptions, 71 yards

The Colts led 23–9 with less than three minutes to play, but a comeback by the Texans forced overtime, where they would win on a field goal. With the loss, the Colts fell to 2–4.

==== Week 7: at Tennessee Titans ====
Week Seven: Indianapolis Colts at Tennessee Titans – Game summary

Quarter	1	2	3	4	Total
**Colts**	7	10	3	14	**34**
Titans	6	7	0	13	**26**

at Nissan Stadium, Nashville, Tennessee

- Date: October 23
- Game time: 1:00 p.m. EDT/12:00 p.m. CDT
- Game weather: 68 °F (20 °C), sunny
- Game attendance: 65,470
- Referee: Jerome Boger
- TV announcers (CBS): Spero Dedes (play-by-play) and Solomon Wilcots (color commentator)
- Recap, Gamebook

Game information

**First quarter**

- TEN – Taylor Lewan 10-yard pass from Marcus Mariota (pass failed), 9:14. Titans 6–0. **Drive: 10 plays, 78 yards, 5:46.**
- IND – Frank Gore 3-yard pass from Andrew Luck (Adam Vinatieri kick), 4:46. Colts 7–6. **Drive: 10 plays, 72 yards, 4:28.**

**Second quarter**

- IND – T. Y. Hilton 37-yard pass from Andrew Luck (Adam Vinatieri kick), 10:16. Colts 14–6. **Drive: 6 plays, 93 yards, 3:24.**
- IND – Adam Vinatieri 28-yard field goal, 7:06. Colts 17–6. **Drive: 6 plays, 25 yards, 3:10.**
- TEN – DeMarco Murray 1-yard run (Ryan Succop kick), 0:34. Colts 17–13. **Drive: 11 plays, 80 yards, 1:38.**

**Third quarter**

- IND – Adam Vinatieri 33-yard field goal, 3:46. Colts 20–13. **Drive: 11 plays, 73 yards, 6:04.**

**Fourth quarter**

- TEN – Delanie Walker 7-yard pass from Marcus Mariota (Ryan Succop kick), 12:39. Tied 20–20. **Drive: 13 plays, 75 yards, 6:07.**
- TEN – Ryan Succop 48-yard field goal, 6:02. Titans 23–20. **Drive: 7 plays, 50 yards, 3:39.**
- IND – Jack Doyle 7-yard pass from Andrew Luck (Adam Vinatieri kick), 1:55. Colts 27–23. **Drive: 12 plays, 70 yards, 4:07.**
- IND – Robert Mathis 14-yard fumble return (Adam Vinatieri kick), 1:47. Colts 34–23.
- TEN – Ryan Succop 44-yard field goal, 0:43. Colts 34–26. **Drive: 7 plays, 49 yards, 1:04.**

**Top passers**

- IND – Andrew Luck – 27/39, 353 yards, 3 TD
- TEN – Marcus Mariota – 22/37, 232 yards, 2 TD

**Top rushers**

- IND – Frank Gore – 17 rushes, 61 yards
- TEN – DeMarco Murray – 25 rushes, 107 yards, TD

**Top receivers**

- IND – Jack Doyle – 9 receptions, 78 yards, TD
- TEN – Delanie Walker – 7 receptions, 84 yards, TD

With the win, the Colts improved to 3–4. They also picked up their 10th straight win over the Titans.

==== Week 8: vs. Kansas City Chiefs ====
Week Eight: Kansas City Chiefs at Indianapolis Colts – Game summary

Quarter	1	2	3	4	Total
**Chiefs**	3	14	7	6	**30**
Colts	0	7	7	0	**14**

at Lucas Oil Stadium, Indianapolis, Indiana

- Date: October 30
- Game time: 1:00 p.m. EDT
- Game weather: Played indoors (retractable roof closed)
- Game attendance: 65,417
- Referee: Craig Wrolstad
- TV announcers (CBS): Spero Dedes (play-by-play) and Solomon Wilcots (color commentator)
- Recap, Gamebook

Game information

**First quarter**

- KC – Cairo Santos 33-yard field goal, 10:20. Chiefs 3–0. **Drive: 12 plays, 60 yards, 4:40.**

**Second quarter**

- KC – Travis Kelce 14-yard pass from Nick Foles (Cairo Santos kick), 12:58. Chiefs 10–0. **Drive: 6 plays, 80 yards, 3:28.**
- IND – Frank Gore 18-yard pass from Andrew Luck (Adam Vinatieri kick), 10:07. Chiefs 10–7. **Drive: 6 plays, 63 yards, 2:51.**
- KC – Jeremy Maclin 13-yard pass from Alex Smith (Cairo Santos kick), 0:19. Chiefs 17–7. **Drive: 3 plays, 36 yards, 0:19.**

**Third quarter**

- KC – Tyreek Hill 34-yard pass from Nick Foles (Cairo Santos kick), 7:34. Chiefs 24–7. **Drive: 10 plays, 75 yards, 5:27.**
- IND – Donte Moncrief 3-yard pass from Andrew Luck (Adam Vinatieri kick), 2:05. Chiefs 24–14. **Drive: 10 plays, 75 yards, 5:29.**

**Fourth quarter**

- KC – Cairo Santos 22-yard field goal, 8:00. Chiefs 27–14. **Drive: 10 plays, 46 yards, 5:05.**
- KC – Cairo Santos 44-yard field goal, 3:35. Chiefs 30–14. **Drive: 8 plays, 44 yards, 3:34.**

**Top passers**

- KC – Nick Foles – 16/22, 223 yards, 2 TD
- IND – Andrew Luck – 19/35, 210 yards, 2 TD, INT

**Top rushers**

- KC – Charcandrick West – 14 rushes, 52 yards
- IND – Andrew Luck – 9 rushes, 60 yards

**Top receivers**

- KC – Travis Kelce – 7 receptions, 101 yards, TD
- IND – Phillip Dorsett – 5 receptions, 33 yards

In a rematch of the 2013 wildcard game, the Chiefs blew out the Colts easily, 30–14. With the loss, the Colts fell to 3–5.

==== Week 9: at Green Bay Packers ====
Week Nine: Indianapolis Colts at Green Bay Packers – Game summary

Quarter	1	2	3	4	Total
**Colts**	14	10	0	7	**31**
Packers	10	0	3	13	**26**

at Lambeau Field, Green Bay, Wisconsin

- Date: November 6
- Game time: 4:25 p.m. EST/3:25 p.m. CST
- Game weather: 68 °F (20 °C), clear
- Game attendance: 78,437
- Referee: Tony Corrente
- TV announcers (CBS): Jim Nantz, Phil Simms and Tracy Wolfson
- Recap, Gamebook

Game information

**First quarter**

- IND – Jordan Todman 99-yard kickoff return (Adam Vinatieri kick), 14:47. Colts 7–0. **Drive: 0 plays, 0 yards, 0:13.**
- GB – Mason Crosby 34-yard field goal, 10:46. Colts 7–3. **Drive: 9 plays, 53 yards, 4:01.**
- IND – Frank Gore 7-yard run (Adam Vinatieri kick), 4:28. Colts 14–3. **Drive: 7 plays, 62 yards, 3:07.**
- GB – Jordy Nelson 26-yard pass from Aaron Rodgers (Mason Crosby kick), 0:00. Colts 14–10. **Drive: 4 plays, 47 yards, 1:25.**

**Second quarter**

- IND – Adam Vinatieri 28-yard field goal, 12:05. Colts 17–10. **Drive: 8 plays, 35 yards, 2:55.**
- IND – Donte Moncrief 8-yard pass from Andrew Luck (Adam Vinatieri kick), 0:11. Colts 24–10. **Drive: 15 plays, 96 yards, 5:33.**

**Third quarter**

- GB – Mason Crosby 27-yard field goal, 1:46. Colts 24–13. **Drive: 10 plays, 65 yards, 5:38.**

**Fourth quarter**

- IND – Frank Gore 4-yard run (Adam Vinatieri kick), 9:35. Colts 31–13. **Drive: 6 plays, 71 yards, 2:53.**
- GB – Davante Adams 2-yard pass from Aaron Rodgers (pass failed), 7:40. Colts 31–19. **Drive: 6 plays, 75 yards, 1:55.**
- GB – Randall Cobb 3-yard pass from Aaron Rodgers (Mason Crosby kick), 3:29. Colts 31–26. **Drive: 7 plays, 80 yards, 1:59.**

**Top passers**

- IND – Andrew Luck – 23/36, 281 yards, TD, 2 INT
- GB – Aaron Rodgers – 26/43, 297 yards, 3 TD, INT

**Top rushers**

- IND – Frank Gore – 19 rushes, 60 yards, 2 TD
- GB – Ty Montgomery – 7 rushes, 53 yards

**Top receivers**

- IND – T. Y. Hilton – 6 receptions, 82 yards
- GB – Jordy Nelson – 7 receptions, 94 yards, TD

This was the Colts' first victory at Lambeau Field since 1988.

==== Week 11: vs. Tennessee Titans ====
Week Eleven: Tennessee Titans at Indianapolis Colts – Game summary

Quarter	1	2	3	4	Total
Titans	0	7	7	3	**17**
**Colts**	14	7	0	3	**24**

at Lucas Oil Stadium, Indianapolis, Indiana

- Date: November 20
- Game time: 1:00 p.m. EST
- Game weather: Played indoors (retractable roof closed)
- Game attendance: 65,048
- Referee: Walt Anderson
- TV announcers (CBS): Spero Dedes (play-by-play) and Solomon Wilcots (color commentator)
- Recap, Gamebook

Game information

**First quarter**

- IND – Robert Turbin 1-yard run (Adam Vinatieri kick), 8:39. Colts 7–0. **Drive: 8 plays, 64 yards, 4:59.**
- IND – Donte Moncrief 2-yard pass from Andrew Luck (Adam Vinatieri kick), 2:32. Colts 14–0. **Drive: 7 plays, 75 yards, 3:55.**

**Second quarter**

- IND – T. Y. Hilton 2-yard pass from Andrew Luck (Adam Vinatieri kick), 10:35. Colts 21–0. **Drive: 9 plays, 80 yards, 4:48.**
- TEN – DeMarco Murray 3-yard pass from Marcus Mariota (Ryan Succop kick), 0:20. Colts 21–7. **Drive: 12 plays, 68 yards, 1:53.**

**Third quarter**

- TEN – Tajae Sharpe 37-yard pass from Marcus Mariota (Ryan Succop kick), 6:35. Colts 21–14. **Drive: 9 plays, 98 yards, 4:50.**

**Fourth quarter**

- TEN – Ryan Succop 47-yard field goal, 12:14. Colts 21–17. **Drive: 11 plays, 65 yards, 5:53.**
- IND – Adam Vinatieri 49-yard field goal, 10:50. Colts 24–17. **Drive:5 plays, 44 yards, 1:24.**

**Top passers**

- TEN – Marcus Mariota – 25/38, 290 yards, 2 TD
- IND – Andrew Luck – 15/28, 262 yards, 2 TD, INT

**Top rushers**

- TEN – DeMarco Murray – 21 rushes, 70 yards
- IND – Frank Gore – 18 rushes, 50 yards

**Top receivers**

- TEN – Rishard Matthews – 9 receptions, 122 yards
- IND – T. Y. Hilton – 5 receptions, 97 yards, TD

With their 11th straight win over the Titans, the Colts improved to 5–5.

==== Week 12: vs. Pittsburgh Steelers ====
Thanksgiving Day game

Week Twelve: Pittsburgh Steelers at Indianapolis Colts – Game summary

Quarter	1	2	3	4	Total
**Steelers**	14	7	0	7	**28**
Colts	0	7	0	0	**7**

at Lucas Oil Stadium, Indianapolis, Indiana

- Date: November 24
- Game time: 8:30 p.m. EST
- Game weather: Played indoors (retractable roof closed)
- Game attendance: 66,583
- Referee: Walt Coleman
- TV announcers (NBC): Mike Tirico (play-by-play), Cris Collinsworth (color commentator) and Michele Tafoya (sideline reporter)
- Recap, Gamebook

Game information

**First quarter**

- PIT – Le'Veon Bell 5-yard run (Chris Boswell kick), 9:10. Steelers 7–0. **Drive: 7 plays, 52 yards, 4:19.**
- PIT – Antonio Brown 25-yard pass from Ben Roethlisberger (Chris Boswell kick), 1:06. Steelers 14–0. **Drive: 7 plays, 58 yards, 3:02.**

**Second quarter**

- IND – Donte Moncrief 5-yard pass from Scott Tolzien (Adam Vinatieri kick), 13:02. Steelers 14–7. **Drive: 6 plays, 47 yards, 3:04.**
- PIT – Antonio Brown 33-yard pass from Ben Roethlisberger (Chris Boswell kick), 9:00. Steelers 21–7. **Drive: 7 plays, 75 yards, 4:02.**

**Third quarter**

- No scoring plays

**Fourth quarter**

- PIT – Antonio Brown 22-yard pass from Ben Roethlisberger (Chris Boswell kick), 5:30. Steelers 28–7. **Drive: 4 plays, 64 yards, 2:21.**

**Top passers**

- PIT – Ben Roethlisberger – 14/20, 221 yards, 3 TD
- IND – Scott Tolzien – 22/36, 205 yards, TD, 2 INT

**Top rushers**

- PIT – Le'Veon Bell – 23 rushes, 120 yards, TD
- IND – Jordan Todman – 3 rushes, 37 yards

**Top receivers**

- PIT – Antonio Brown – 5 receptions, 91 yards, 3 TD
- IND – T. Y. Hilton – 3 receptions, 54 yards

Quarterback Andrew Luck did not play due to a concussion, and his replacement Scott Tolzien was unable to prevent a 28–7 defeat, although he did throw a five-yard touchdown pass to Donte Moncrief early in the second quarter.

==== Week 13: at New York Jets ====
Week Thirteen: Indianapolis Colts at New York Jets – Game summary

Quarter	1	2	3	4	Total
**Colts**	14	10	10	7	**41**
Jets	0	3	0	7	**10**

at MetLife Stadium, East Rutherford, New Jersey

- Date: December 5
- Game time: 8:30 p.m. EST
- Game weather: 45 °F (7 °C), clear
- Game attendance: 78,160
- Referee: Ronald Torbert
- TV announcers (ESPN): Sean McDonough (play-by-play), Jon Gruden (color commentator) and Lisa Salters (sideline reporter)
- Recap, Gamebook

Game information

**First quarter**

- IND – Dwayne Allen 7-yard pass from Andrew Luck (Adam Vinatieri kick), 10:23. Colts 7–0. **Drive: 7 plays, 51 yards, 3:33.**
- IND – Dwayne Allen 21-yard pass from Andrew Luck (Adam Vinatieri kick), 7:45. Colts 14–0. **Drive: 4 plays, 69 yards, 1:47.**

**Second quarter**

- NYJ – Nick Folk 38-yard field goal, 10:31. Colts 14–3. **Drive: 10 plays, 77 yards, 4:29.**
- IND – Adam Vinatieri 53-yard field goal, 8:16. Colts 17–3. **Drive: 6 plays, 40 yards, 2:15.**
- IND – Dwayne Allen 23-yard pass from Andrew Luck (Adam Vinatieri kick), 1:18. Colts 24–3. **Drive: 9 plays, 70 yards, 5:20.**

**Third quarter**

- IND – Donte Moncrief 3-yard pass from Andrew Luck (Adam Vinatieri kick), 8:54. Colts 31–3. **Drive: 11 plays, 75 yards, 6:06.**
- IND – Adam Vinatieri 36-yard field goal, 1:08. Colts 34–3. **Drive: 10 plays, 43 yards, 5:11.**

**Fourth quarter**

- IND – Robert Turbin 5-yard run (Adam Vinatieri kick), 14:54. Colts 41–3. **Drive: 2 plays, 6 yards, 0:20.**
- NYJ – Robby Anderson 40-yard pass from Bryce Petty (Nick Folk kick), 11:19. Colts 41–10. **Drive: 11 plays, 75 yards, 3:35.**

**Top passers**

- IND – Andrew Luck – 22/28, 278 yards, 4 TD
- NYJ – Bryce Petty – 11/25, 135 yards, TD, 2 INT

**Top rushers**

- IND – Frank Gore – 20 rushes, 79 yards
- NYJ – Matt Forte – 9 rushes, 25 yards

**Top receivers**

- IND – T. Y. Hilton – 9 receptions, 146 yards
- NYJ – Robby Anderson – 4 receptions, 61 yards, TD

With the win, the Colts evened their record at 6–6.

==== Week 14: vs. Houston Texans ====
Week Fourteen: Houston Texans at Indianapolis Colts – Game summary

Quarter	1	2	3	4	Total
**Texans**	3	10	3	6	**22**
Colts	3	0	7	7	**17**

at Lucas Oil Stadium, Indianapolis, Indiana

- Date: December 11
- Game time: 1:00 p.m. EST
- Game weather: Played indoors (retractable roof closed)
- Game attendance: 65,250
- Referee: Brad Allen
- TV announcers (CBS): Kevin Harlan and Rich Gannon
- Recap, Gamebook

Game information

**First quarter**

- IND – Adam Vinatieri 32-yard field goal, 8:35. Colts 3–0. **Drive: 10 plays, 74 yards, 3:50.**
- HOU – Nick Novak 21-yard field goal, 4:04. Tied 3–3. **Drive: 6 plays, 13 yards, 2:01.**

**Second quarter**

- HOU – Lamar Miller 2-yard run (Nick Novak kick), 2:26. Texans 10–3. **Drive: 12 plays, 80 yards, 7:19.**
- HOU – Nick Novak 52-yard field goal, 0:12. Texans 13–3. **Drive: 5 plays, 22 yards, 0:29.**

**Third quarter**

- HOU – Nick Novak 24-yard field goal, 12:46. Texans 16–3. **Drive: 5 plays, 12 yards, 1:08.**
- IND – Frank Gore 18-yard pass from Andrew Luck (Adam Vinatieri kick), 9:53. Texans 16–10. **Drive: 6 plays, 75 yards, 2:53.**

**Fourth quarter**

- HOU – Nick Novak 41-yard field goal, 11:53. Texans 19–10. **Drive: 11 plays, 64 yards, 4:51.**
- IND – T. Y. Hilton 35-yard pass from Andrew Luck (Adam Vinatieri kick), 9:06. Texans 19–17. **Drive: 8 plays, 83 yards, 2:47.**
- HOU – Nick Novak 34-yard field goal, 2:51. Texans 22–17. **Drive: 11 plays, 58 yards, 6:15.**

**Top passers**

- HOU – Brock Osweiler – 14/24, 147 yards, INT
- IND – Andrew Luck – 24/45, 276 yards, 2 TD, 2 INT

**Top rushers**

- HOU – Lamar Miller – 21 carries, 107 yards, TD
- IND – Frank Gore – 10 carries, 41 yards

**Top receivers**

- HOU – DeAndre Hopkins – 2 receptions, 33 yards
- IND – T. Y. Hilton – 9 receptions, 115 yards, TD

With the loss, the Colts fell to 6–7 and were swept by the Texans for the first time in franchise history.

==== Week 15: at Minnesota Vikings ====
Week Fifteen: Indianapolis Colts at Minnesota Vikings – Game summary

Quarter	1	2	3	4	Total
**Colts**	10	17	0	7	**34**
Vikings	0	0	3	3	**6**

at U.S. Bank Stadium, Minneapolis, Minnesota

- Date: December 18
- Game time: 1:00 p.m. EST/12:00 p.m. CST
- Game weather: Played indoors (dome stadium)
- Game attendance: 66,820
- Referee: Jerome Boger
- TV announcers (CBS): Kevin Harlan and Rich Gannon
- Recap, Gamebook

Game information

**First quarter**

- IND – Adam Vinatieri 48-yard field goal, 9:01. Colts 3–0. **Drive: 11 plays, 46 yards, 5:59.**
- IND – Robert Turbin 1-yard run (Adam Vinatieri kick), 2:22. Colts 10–0. **Drive: 11 plays, 52 yards, 4:57.**

**Second quarter**

- IND – Erik Swoope 27-yard pass from Andrew Luck (Adam Vinatieri kick), 7:16. Colts 17–0. **Drive: 9 plays, 92 yards, 5:39.**
- IND – Robert Turbin 6-yard run (Adam Vinatieri kick), 0:33. Colts 24–0. **Drive: 13 plays, 91 yards, 5:35.**
- IND – Adam Vinatieri 50-yard field goal, 0:00. Colts 27–0. **Drive: 2 plays, 4 yards, 0:19.**

**Third quarter**

- MIN – Kai Forbath 32-yard field goal, 3:51. Colts 27–3. **Drive: 12 plays, 71 yards, 4:10.**

**Fourth quarter**

- IND – Phillip Dorsett 50-yard pass from Andrew Luck (Adam Vinatieri kick), 14:55. Colts 34–3. **Drive: 7 plays, 88 yards, 3:56.**
- MIN – Kai Forbath 51-yard field goal, 11:57. Colts 34–6. **Drive: 9 plays, 39 yards, 2:58.**

**Top passers**

- IND – Andrew Luck – 21/28, 250 yards, 2 TD
- MIN – Sam Bradford – 32/42, 291 yards, INT

**Top rushers**

- IND – Frank Gore – 26 rushes, 101 yards
- MIN – Adrian Peterson – 6 rushes, 22 yards

**Top receivers**

- IND – Phillip Dorsett – 1 reception, 50 yards, TD
- MIN – Kyle Rudolph – 8 receptions, 97 yards

With the win, the Colts improved to 7–7 and remained just in the thick of the playoff race.

==== Week 16: at Oakland Raiders ====
Week Sixteen: Indianapolis Colts at Oakland Raiders – Game summary

Quarter	1	2	3	4	Total
Colts	0	7	7	11	**25**
**Raiders**	0	19	14	0	**33**

at Oakland Alameda Coliseum, Oakland, California

- Date: December 24
- Game time: 4:05 p.m. EST/1:05 p.m. PST
- Game weather: 50 °F (10 °C), sunny
- Game attendance: 54,896
- Referee: Ed Hochuli
- TV announcers (CBS): Jim Nantz, Phil Simms and Tracy Wolfson
- Recap, Gamebook

Game information

**First quarter**

- No scoring plays

**Second quarter**

- OAK – Andre Holmes 1-yard pass from Derek Carr (Sebastian Janikowski kick), 14:57. Raiders 7–0. **Drive: 12 plays, 54 yards, 7:12.**
- IND – Donte Moncrief 24-yard pass from Andrew Luck (Adam Vinatieri kick), 9:49. Tied 7–7. **Drive: 9 plays, 75 yards, 5:08.**
- OAK – Clive Walford 5-yard pass from Derek Carr (kick failed, wide left), 5:50. Raiders 13–7. **Drive: 8 plays, 79 yards, 3:59.**
- OAK – Jalen Richard 4-yard pass from Derek Carr (kick blocked), 0:18. Raiders 19–7. **Drive: 6 plays, 80 yards, 0:55.**

**Third quarter**

- OAK – DeAndré Washington 22-yard run (Sebastian Janikowski kick), 10:48. Raiders 26–7. **Drive: 7 plays, 77 yards, 4:12.**
- OAK – DeAndré Washington 22-yard run (Sebastian Janikowski kick), 8:40. Raiders 33–7. **Drive: 3 plays, 38 yards, 1:33.**
- IND – Robert Turbin 3-yard pass from Andrew Luck (Adam Vinatieri kick), 5:18. Raiders 33–14. **Drive: 8 plays, 75 yards, 3:22.**

**Fourth quarter**

- IND – Andrew Luck 11-yard run (Andrew Luck–T. Y. Hilton pass), 7:40. Raiders 33–22. **Drive: 6 plays, 68 yards, 2:36.**
- IND – Adam Vinatieri 42-yard field goal, 2:33. Raiders 33–25. **Drive: 5 plays, 40 yards, 1:15.**

**Top passers**

- IND – Andrew Luck – 19/29, 288 yards, 2 TD, 2 INT
- OAK – Derek Carr – 20/30, 228 yards, 3 TD

**Top rushers**

- IND – Frank Gore – 13 rushes, 73 yards
- OAK – DeAndré Washington – 12 rushes, 99 yards, 2 TD

**Top receivers**

- IND – T. Y. Hilton – 4 receptions, 105 yards
- OAK – Michael Crabtree – 7 receptions, 90 yards

With the loss, the Colts fell to 7–8 and were officially eliminated from playoff contention for the second year in a row.

==== Week 17: vs. Jacksonville Jaguars ====
Week Seventeen: Jacksonville Jaguars at Indianapolis Colts – Game summary

Quarter	1	2	3	4	Total
Jaguars	10	7	0	3	**20**
**Colts**	0	3	14	7	**24**

at Lucas Oil Stadium, Indianapolis, Indiana

- Date: January 1, 2017
- Game time: 1:00 p.m. EST
- Game weather: Played indoors (retractable roof closed)
- Game attendance: 65,160
- Referee: Clete Blakeman
- TV announcers (CBS): Spero Dedes and Solomon Wilcots
- Recap, Gamebook

Game information

**First quarter**

- JAX – Jason Myers 47-yard field goal, 10:11. Jaguars 3–0. **Drive: 7 plays, 57 yards, 3:30.**
- JAX – Ben Koyack 14-yard pass from Blake Bortles (Jason Myers kick), 6:03. Jaguars 10–0. **Drive: 7 plays, 75 yards, 3:09.**

**Second quarter**

- JAX – Corey Grant 57-yard run (Jason Myers kick), 5:57. Jaguars 17–0. **Drive: 2 plays, 62 yards, 0:48.**
- IND – Adam Vinatieri 45-yard field goal, 2:46. Jaguars 17–3. **Drive: 8 plays, 48 yards, 3:04.**

**Third quarter**

- IND – Robert Turbin 7-yard run (Adam Vinatieri kick), 10:22. Jaguars 17–10. **Drive: 5 plays, 83 yards, 2:35.**
- IND – Dwayne Allen 15-yard pass from Andrew Luck (Adam Vinatieri kick), 0:19. Tied 17–17. **Drive: 12 plays, 89 yards, 6:43.**

**Fourth quarter**

- JAX – Jason Myers 41-yard field goal, 1:38. Jaguars 20–17. **Drive: 4 plays, 7 yards, 0:21.**
- IND – Jack Doyle 1-yard pass from Andrew Luck (Adam Vinatieri kick), 0:14. Colts 24–20. **Drive: 8 plays, 75 yards, 1:24.**

**Top passers**

- JAX – Blake Bortles – 25/39, 301 yards, TD
- IND – Andrew Luck – 24/40, 321 yards, 2 TD, INT

**Top rushers**

- JAX – Corey Grant – 18 rushes, 122 yards, TD
- IND – Frank Gore – 16 rushes, 62 yards

**Top receivers**

- JAX – Marqise Lee – 6 receptions, 86 yards
- IND – T. Y. Hilton – 6 receptions, 95 yards

The Jaguars took a 17–0 lead during the second quarter, but the Colts were able to pull it back to 17–17 as the game moved into its final period. The Jaguars regained the lead with a 41-yard Jason Myers field goal inside the two-minute warning, but Andrew Luck led the Colts on a 75-yard drive that culminated with a 1-yard touchdown pass to Jack Doyle with four seconds remaining. With the win, the Colts ended their year 8–8 and snapped their two-game losing streak against the Jaguars.

== Standings ==
=== Division ===
AFC South
	W	L	T	PCT	DIV	CONF	PF	PA	STK
^{(4)} Houston Texans	9	7	0	.563	5–1	7–5	279	328	L1
Tennessee Titans	9	7	0	.563	2–4	6–6	381	378	W1
Indianapolis Colts	8	8	0	.500	3–3	5–7	411	392	W1
Jacksonville Jaguars	3	13	0	.188	2–4	2–10	318	400	L1

=== Conference ===
AFC
#	Team	Division	W	L	T	PCT	DIV	CONF	SOS	SOV	STK
Division leaders
1	New England Patriots	East	14	2	0	.875	5–1	11–1	.439	.424	W7
2 (Note: Kansas City clinched the AFC West division over Oakland based on head-to-head sweep.)	Kansas City Chiefs	West	12	4	0	.750	6–0	9–3	.508	.479	W2
3	Pittsburgh Steelers	North	11	5	0	.688	5–1	9–3	.494	.423	W7
4 (Note: Houston clinched the AFC South division title over Tennessee based on record vs. division opponents.)	Houston Texans	South	9	7	0	.563	5–1	7–5	.502	.427	L1
Wild Cards
5	Oakland Raiders	West	12	4	0	.750	3–3	9–3	.504	.443	L1
6	Miami Dolphins	East	10	6	0	.625	4–2	7–5	.455	.341	L1
Did not qualify for the postseason
7 (Note: Tennessee finished ahead of Denver based on head-to-head victory.)	Tennessee Titans	South	9	7	0	.563	2–4	6–6	.465	.458	W1
8	Denver Broncos	West	9	7	0	.563	2–4	6–6	.549	.455	W1
9 (Note: Baltimore finished ahead of Indianapolis based on record vs. conference opponents.)	Baltimore Ravens	North	8	8	0	.500	4–2	7–5	.498	.363	L2
10	Indianapolis Colts	South	8	8	0	.500	3–3	5–7	.492	.406	W1
11	Buffalo Bills	East	7	9	0	.438	1–5	4–8	.482	.339	L2
12	Cincinnati Bengals	North	6	9	1	.406	3–3	5–7	.521	.333	W1
13 (Note: The New York Jets finished ahead of San Diego based record vs. common opponents — the Jets' cumulative record against Cleveland, Indianapolis, Kansas City and Miami was 1–4, while San Diego's cumulative record against the same four teams was 0–5.)	New York Jets	East	5	11	0	.313	2–4	4–8	.518	.313	W1
14	San Diego Chargers	West	5	11	0	.313	1–5	4–8	.543	.513	L5
15	Jacksonville Jaguars	South	3	13	0	.188	2–4	2–10	.527	.417	L1
16	Cleveland Browns	North	1	15	0	.063	0–6	1–11	.549	.313	L1
Tiebreakers (Note: When breaking ties for three or more teams under the NFL's rules, they are first broken within divisions, then comparing only the highest ranked remaining team from each division.)
