= Steve McClure =

Steve McClure may refer to:

- Steve McClure (climber)
- Steve McClure (politician)

== See also ==
- Stefan McClure, American football player and coach
