= Josh Ferguson =

American football player (born 1993)

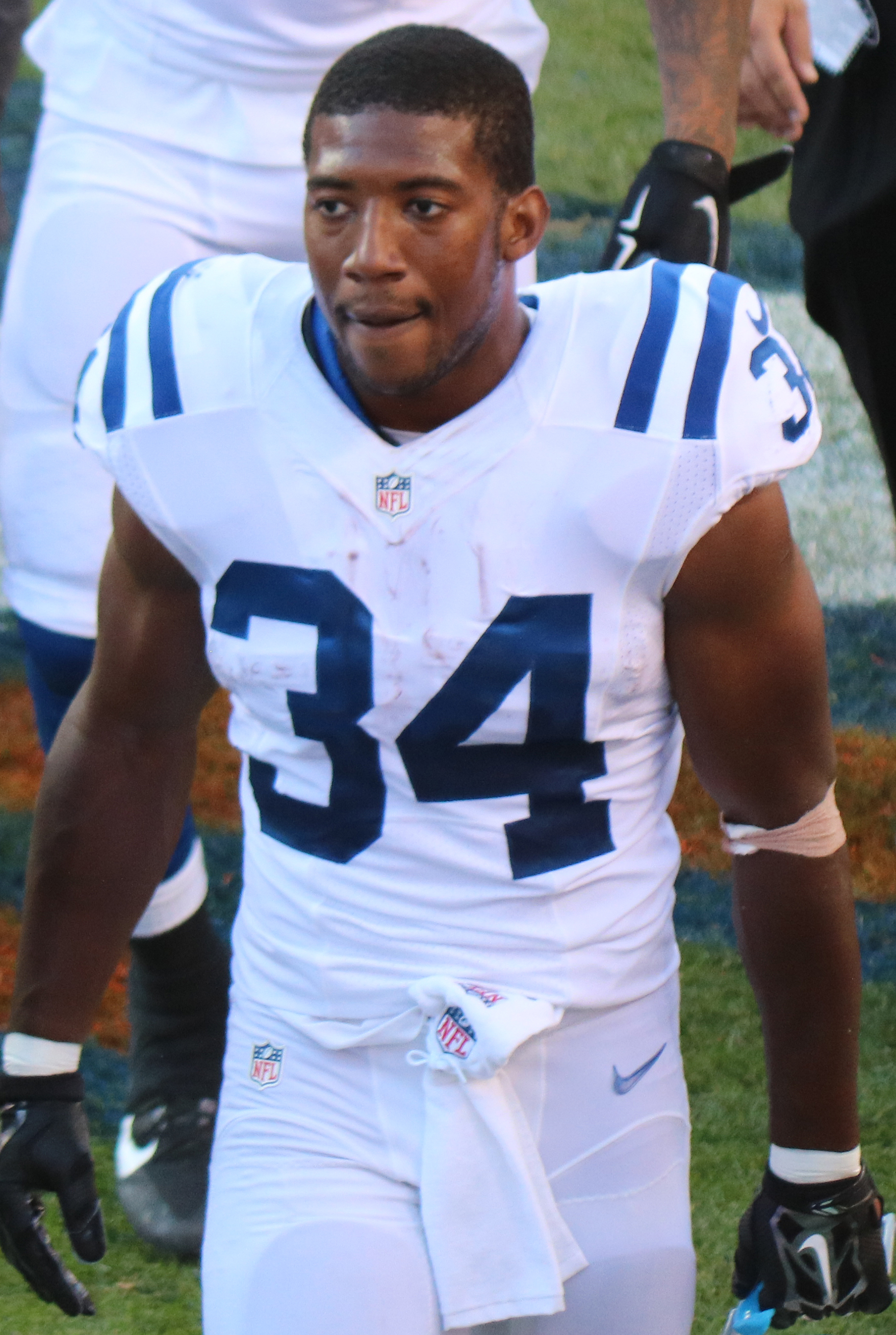
- Ferguson with the Indianapolis Colts in 2016

No. 34, 39, 36
- Position: Running back

Personal information
- Born: May 23, 1993 (age 33); Naperville, Illinois, U.S.
- Listed height: 5 ft 10 in (1.78 m)
- Listed weight: 200 lb (91 kg)

Career information
- High school: Joliet Catholic (Joliet, Illinois)
- College: Illinois
- NFL draft: 2016: undrafted

Career history
- Indianapolis Colts (2016–2018); Houston Texans (2018)*; New England Patriots (2018)*; Houston Texans (2018–2019)*; Washington Redskins (2019)
- * Offseason or practice squad member only

Awards and highlights
- Third-team All-Big Ten (2015)

Career NFL statistics
- Rushing yards: 34
- Rushing average: 1.8
- Receptions: 23
- Receiving yards: 152
- Return yards: 166
- Stats at Pro Football Reference

Josh Ferguson (born May 23, 1993) is an American former professional football player who was a running back in the National Football League (NFL). He played college football for the Illinois Fighting Illini, and signed with the Indianapolis Colts as an undrafted free agent in 2016.

== Early life ==
Ferguson attended Joliet Catholic Academy, where he rushed for 1,868 yards and 25 touchdowns. A 3-star running back recruit, Ferguson committed to Illinois to play college football over offers from Air Force, Ball State, East Carolina, Memphis, North Dakota State, Ohio, and Toledo.

== College career ==
Ferguson debuted as a true freshman in 2011, playing in the first three games of the season, but he suffered a season-ending hamstring injury in week 3 and was approved for a medical hardship waiver, allowing him to redshirt. As a redshirt freshman in 2012, Ferguson played in 10 games, starting six. He ran 75 times for 312 yards, recorded 29 receptions for 251 yards, and returned 19 kicks for 344 yards. In 2013, as a redshirt sophomore, he ran 141 times for 779 yards and seven touchdowns, and caught 50 passes for 535 yards and four touchdowns. Ferguson played in all 13 games in 2014, starting nine, leading the team in rushing with 735 yards and eight touchdowns, and recorded 50 receptions for 427 yards and two touchdowns.

As a redshirt senior in 2015, Ferguson missed three games due to a shoulder injury, starting the team’s remaining nine games, recording 129 carries for 708 yards and three touchdowns, along with 37 receptions for 280 yards and two touchdowns. Ferguson was voted Third-team All-Big Ten for his 2015 season.

Overall, in 47 career games, Ferguson ran for 2,586 yards and 18 touchdowns, and recorded 168 receptions for 1,507 yards and eight touchdowns. He graduated with a degree in kinesiology.

== Professional career ==
Pre-draft measurables
Height	Weight	Hand span	40-yard dash	Vertical jump	Broad jump	Bench press
5 ft 9 in (1.75 m)	198 lb (90 kg)	9 in (0.23 m)	4.48 s	34 1/2	10 ft 0 in (3.05 m)	21 reps
All values from NFL Combine

=== Indianapolis Colts ===
After appearing in the 2016 NFL Scouting Combine, Ferguson was not selected in the 2016 NFL draft. He signed with the Indianapolis Colts as an undrafted free agent on May 2, 2016. Despite going undrafted, Ferguson made the final 53-man roster for the 2016 Colts. As a rookie, Ferguson played in all 16 games, recording 15 carries for 20 yards and 20 receptions for 136 yards. He also played on special teams, returning four kicks for 80 yards, one punt for no yards, and made two special teams tackles.

On September 2, 2017, Ferguson was waived with an injury designation by the Colts and was placed on injured reserve. He was released on September 8, 2017. He was re-signed to the practice squad on October 17, 2017. He was promoted to the active roster on October 20, 2017. In the 2017 season, Ferguson appeared in 10 games, rushing once for five yards, catching three passes for 16 yards, and returning five kicks for 86 yards.

On August 22, 2018, Ferguson was waived with an injury designation by the Colts, and after clearing waivers, he was placed on injured reserve. He was released on September 18, 2018.

=== Houston Texans ===
On October 16, 2018, Ferguson was signed to the Houston Texans practice squad, but was released a week later.

=== New England Patriots ===
On November 7, 2018, Ferguson was signed to the New England Patriots practice squad, but was released two days later.

=== Houston Texans (second stint) ===
On November 12, 2018, Ferguson was signed to the Houston Texans practice squad. He signed a reserve/future contract with the Texans on January 7, 2019. On August 30, 2019, Ferguson was released.

=== Washington Redskins / Football Team ===
On October 16, 2019, Ferguson was signed to the Washington Redskins practice squad. He was promoted to the active roster on December 10, 2019, before being released on August 3, 2020.

== NFL career statistics ==
Year	Team	Games		Rushing					Receiving					Fumbles	
Year	Team	GP	GS	Att	Yds	Avg	Lng	TD	Rec	Yds	Avg	Lng	TD	Fum	Lost
2016	IND	16	0	15	20	1.3	11	0	20	136	6.8	14	0	0	0
2017	IND	10	0	1	5	5.0	5	0	3	16	5.3	8	0	0	0
2019	WAS	2	0	3	9	3.0	7	0	—	—	—	—	—	0	0
Total		28	0	19	34	1.8	11	0	23	152	6.6	14	0	0	0
