= David Caldwell (American football executive) =

American football executive

Florida Gators
- Title: General manager

Personal information
- Born: 1974 (age 51–52); Buffalo, New York, U.S.

Career information
- Position: Linebacker
- College: John Carroll University

Career history
- Carolina Panthers (1996–1997) Scouting assistant; Indianapolis Colts (1998–2007) Area scout; Atlanta Falcons (2008–2011) Director of college scouting; Atlanta Falcons (2012) Director of player personnel; Jacksonville Jaguars (2013–2020) General manager; Philadelphia Eagles (2021–2025) Personnel executive; Florida (2025–present) General manager

Awards and highlights
- Super Bowl champions (XLI, LIX)
- Executive profile at Pro Football Reference

David Caldwell (born c. 1974) is an American football executive who is the general manager for the Florida Gators football program. He previously served as the general manager of the National Football League's Jacksonville Jaguars from 2013 to 2020. He has also worked for the Carolina Panthers, Indianapolis Colts, Atlanta Falcons, and Philadelphia Eagles.

== Early life ==
Caldwell was born in Buffalo, New York where he attended Saint Francis Highschool, where he was teammates with Brian Daboll, Tom Telesco and Brian Polian. He went on to attend John Carroll University where he played linebacker from 1992 to 1996. He was a teammate of Baltimore Ravens offensive coordinator Greg Roman, Brian Polian, Josh McDaniels, London Fletcher, formerly a linebacker with the St. Louis Rams, Buffalo Bills, and Washington Redskins, as well as Tom Telesco.

== Executive career ==
=== Carolina Panthers ===
Caldwell began his career as a scouting assistant for the Carolina Panthers from 1996 to 1997.

=== Indianapolis Colts ===
Caldwell spent ten years (1998–2007) with the Indianapolis Colts as an area scout. He was a member of the staff when the team won Super Bowl XLI in 2006.

=== Atlanta Falcons ===
In 2008, Caldwell was hired by the Atlanta Falcons as their director of college scouting. In 2012, he was promoted to director of player personnel.

=== Jacksonville Jaguars ===
On January 8, 2013, Caldwell was named the general manager of the Jacksonville Jaguars. His first order of business with the team was to fire the head coach Mike Mularkey who had just completed his first season. On January 17, 2013, the team hired former Seattle Seahawks defensive coordinator Gus Bradley as his replacement, who was eventually fired late in the 2016 season. On February 23, 2018, the Jaguars extended his contract through 2021.

On November 29, 2020, Caldwell was fired by the Jaguars following a 27–25 loss to the Cleveland Browns and a 1–10 start to the season. He finished his tenure in Jacksonville with a 37–86 (.301) record and a 2–1 (.667) playoff record for a 39–87 (.310) career record.

=== Philadelphia Eagles ===
In 2021, Caldwell was hired by the Philadelphia Eagles as a personnel executive. On June 3, 2022, it was announced that Caldwell had assumed the roles of senior personnel director and advisor to the general manager. He won a second Super Bowl championship when the Eagles defeated the Kansas City Chiefs 40–22 in Super Bowl LIX.

=== Florida ===
On December 1, 2025, Caldwell was appointed general manager for the University of Florida's football program.
