= Jonathan Woodard =

American football player (born 1993)

No. 66, 76, 99
- Position: Defensive end

Personal information
- Born: September 19, 1993 (age 33); Brentwood, Tennessee, U.S.
- Listed height: 6 ft 5 in (1.96 m)
- Listed weight: 271 lb (123 kg)

Career information
- High school: Ravenwood (Brentwood)
- College: Central Arkansas
- NFL draft: 2016: 7th round, 226th overall pick

Career history
- Jacksonville Jaguars (2016); Atlanta Falcons (2017)*; Miami Dolphins (2017–2019); Buffalo Bills (2019–2020)*; Saskatchewan Roughriders (2021); Kansas City Chiefs (2022)*
- * Offseason or practice squad member only

Career NFL statistics
- Games played: 6
- Total tackles: 10
- Sacks: 1
- Stats at Pro Football Reference

Career CFL statistics
- Games played: 14
- Total tackles: 21
- Sacks: 10
- Forced fumbles: 2
- Stats at CFL.ca

Jonathan Woodard (born September 19, 1993) is an American former professional football player who was a defensive end in the National Football League (NFL) and Canadian Football League (CFL). He was selected by the Jacksonville Jaguars in the seventh round of the 2016 NFL draft. He played college football for the Central Arkansas Bears.

== Professional career ==
Pre-draft measurables
Height	Weight	Arm length	Hand span	40-yard dash	10-yard split	20-yard split	20-yard shuttle	Three-cone drill	Vertical jump	Broad jump	Bench press
6 ft 4 7/8 in (1.95 m)	271 lb (123 kg)	34 in (0.86 m)	9 1/2 in (0.24 m)	4.89 s	1.69 s	2.76 s	4.40 s	7.08 s	34.0 in (0.86 m)	9 ft 9 in (2.97 m)	28 reps
All values from Pro Day

=== Jacksonville Jaguars ===
Woodard was selected by the Jacksonville Jaguars in the seventh round (226th overall) of the 2016 NFL draft. On May 23, 2016, he suffered a torn Achilles tendon during team workouts. He underwent surgery the same day, and missed his entire rookie season. On September 2, 2017, Woodard was waived by the Jaguars.

=== Atlanta Falcons ===
On October 11, 2017, Woodard was signed to the practice squad of the Atlanta Falcons. He was released by the team on October 24.

=== Miami Dolphins ===
On December 5, 2017, Woodard was signed to the Miami Dolphins' practice squad. He signed a reserve/future contract with the Dolphins on January 1, 2018.

On September 1, 2018, Woodard was waived by the Dolphins and was signed to the practice squad the next day. He was promoted to the active roster on September 26.

On August 11, 2019, Woodard was waived/injured by the Dolphins and placed on injured reserve. He was waived from injured reserve on December 24.

=== Buffalo Bills ===
On January 1, 2020, Woodard was signed to the Buffalo Bills' practice squad. He signed a reserve/future contract with the Bills on January 6. He was waived on August 5.

=== Saskatchewan Roughriders ===
Woodard signed with the Saskatchewan Roughriders of the Canadian Football League on May 20, 2021.

=== Kansas City Chiefs ===
On February 7, 2022, Woodard signed a reserve/future contract with the Kansas City Chiefs. He was waived on May 5.
