= Tyrone Holmes (American football) =

American football player (born 1993)

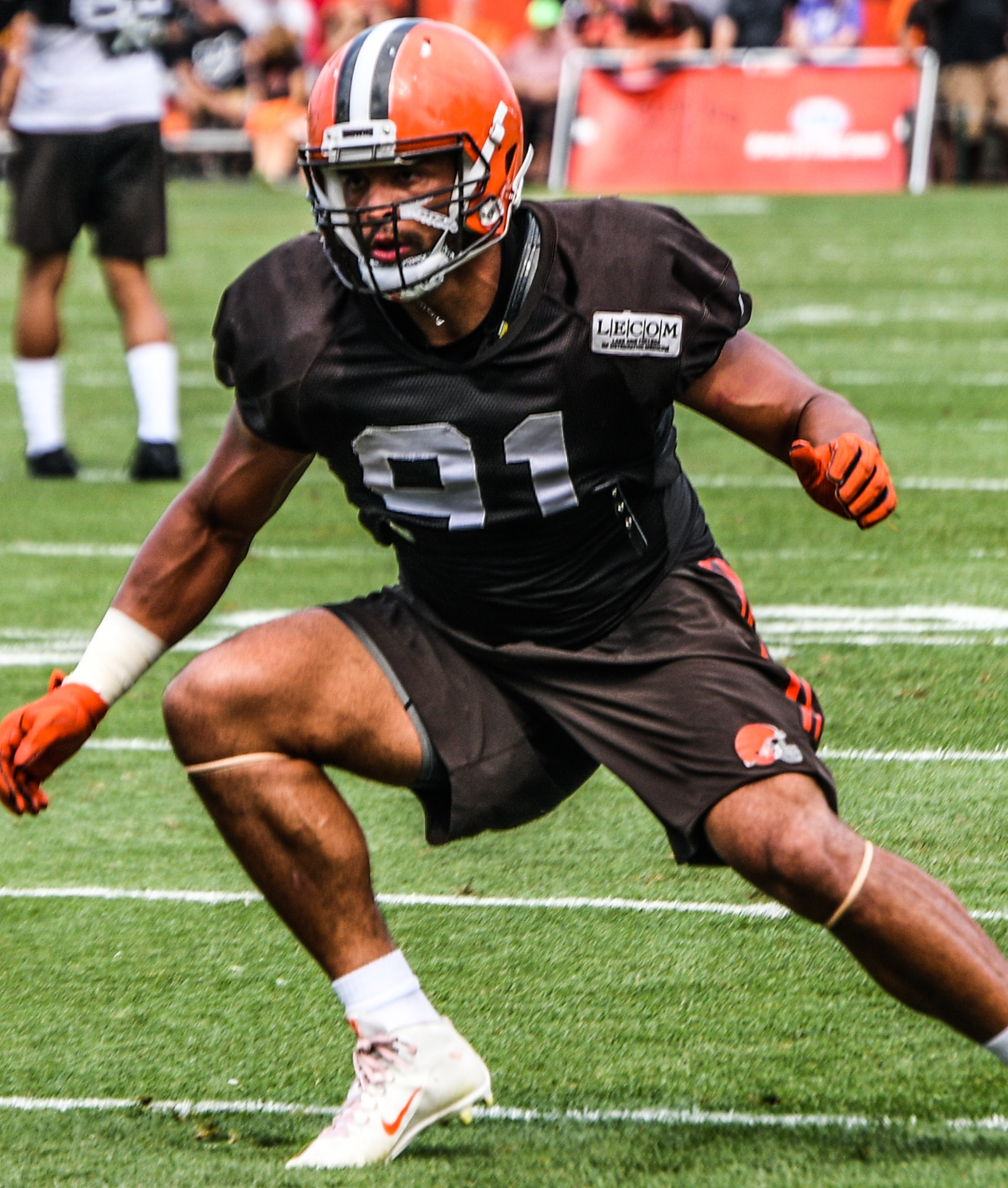
- Holmes with the Cleveland Browns in 2017

No. 91
- Position: Linebacker

Personal information
- Born: September 10, 1993 (age 33); Eagle Point, Oregon, U.S.
- Listed height: 6 ft 2 in (1.88 m)
- Listed weight: 248 lb (112 kg)

Career information
- High school: Eagle Point
- College: Montana
- NFL draft: 2016: 6th round, 181st overall pick

Career history
- Jacksonville Jaguars (2016)*; Cleveland Browns (2016–2017); Kansas City Chiefs (2017–2018)*; New York Jets (2018)*; San Antonio Commanders (2018)*; Los Angeles Chargers (2018)*; San Antonio Commanders (2019); Miami Dolphins (2019)*
- * Offseason or practice squad member only

Awards and highlights
- STATS FCS Defensive Player of the Year (2015)

Career NFL statistics
- Total tackles: 9
- Sacks: 1
- Stats at Pro Football Reference

Tyrone Anthony Holmes (born September 10, 1993) is an American former professional football player who was a linebacker in the National Football League (NFL). He was selected by the Jacksonville Jaguars in the sixth round of the 2016 NFL draft. He played college football for the Montana Grizzlies.

== Professional career ==
=== Jacksonville Jaguars ===
Holmes was selected by the Jacksonville Jaguars in the sixth round with the 181st overall pick in the 2016 NFL draft. On September 3, 2016, he was released by the Jaguars.

=== Cleveland Browns ===
Holmes was claimed off waivers by the Cleveland Browns on September 4, 2016.

On September 3, 2017, Holmes was waived by the Browns, but was re-signed on September 7. He was waived again on September 16, 2017, and re-signed to the practice squad. He was promoted to the active roster on November 21, 2017. He was waived on December 13, 2017.

=== Kansas City Chiefs ===
On December 14, 2017, Holmes was signed to the Kansas City Chiefs' practice squad. He signed a reserve/future contract with the Chiefs on January 10, 2018. He was waived on September 1, 2018.

=== San Antonio Commanders (first stint) ===
In December 2018, Holmes signed with the San Antonio Commanders of the Alliance of American Football (AAF) before departing the team to join the Los Angeles Chargers practice squad.

=== Los Angeles Chargers ===
On December 26, 2018, Holmes was signed to the Los Angeles Chargers practice squad.

=== San Antonio Commanders (second stint) ===
Holmes returned to the Commanders on January 22, 2019.

=== Miami Dolphins ===
After the AAF suspended football operations, Holmes signed with the Miami Dolphins on April 9, 2019. He was released on August 31, 2019.
