= Stefan McClure =

American football player (born 1993)

SMU Mustangs
- Title: Cornerbacks coach

Personal information
- Born: January 31, 1993 (age 33); Vista, California, U.S.
- Listed height: 5 ft 11 in (1.80 m)
- Listed weight: 205 lb (93 kg)

Career information
- High school: Vista
- College: California
- NFL draft: 2016: undrafted

Career history

Playing
- Indianapolis Colts (2016–2017)*; Washington Redskins (2017); Detroit Lions (2017)*; Oakland Raiders (2017)*; Detroit Lions (2018)*
- * Offseason or practice squad member only

Coaching
- SMU (2019–2020) Graduate assistant; SMU (2021–present) Cornerbacks coach

Career NFL statistics
- Total tackles: 3
- Stats at Pro Football Reference

Stefan Arnaz McClure (born January 31, 1993) is an American football coach and former strong safety who is currently the corner backs coach at Southern Methodist University (SMU). He played college football at the University of California, Berkeley, and signed with the Indianapolis Colts as an undrafted free agent in 2016.

== Professional career ==
=== Indianapolis Colts ===
McClure signed with the Indianapolis Colts as an undrafted free agent after not being selected in the 2016 NFL draft on May 2, 2016. He was waived on September 3, 2016 for final roster cuts. The Colts signed McClure to their practice squad on December 7, 2016. On January 2, 2017, McClure signed a futures contract with the team, but was waived on May 1, 2017.

=== Washington Redskins ===
On August 3, 2017, McClure signed with the Washington Redskins. Despite being a late addition in the offseason, he had a strong preseason and made the final roster. He played in seven games, primarily on special teams, before suffering a hamstring injury in Week 8. He was placed on injured reserve on November 1, 2017. He was released with an injury settlement on November 8, 2017.

=== Detroit Lions ===
On November 27, 2017, McClure was signed to the Detroit Lions' practice squad. He was released on December 5, 2017.

=== Oakland Raiders ===
On December 19, 2017, McClure was signed to the Oakland Raiders' practice squad.

=== Detroit Lions (second stint) ===
On January 2, 2018, McClure signed a reserve/future contract with the Lions. He was waived/injured on August 19, 2018 and was placed on injured reserve. He was released on August 25, 2018.

== Coaching career ==
=== SMU ===
Stefan began coaching in 2019 as a defensive graduate assistant under his former head coach Sonny Dykes at SMU. In March of 2021 he was promoted to the team’s cornerbacks coach after Kevin Curtis left for Baylor.
