= 2016 NFL draft =

Selection of American football players

General information
- Date: April 28–30, 2016
- Location: Auditorium Theatre in Chicago, Illinois
- Networks: ESPN, ESPN2, NFL Network

Overview
- 253 total selections in 7 rounds
- League: NFL
- First selection: Jared Goff, QB; Los Angeles Rams
- Mr. Irrelevant: Kalan Reed, CB; Tennessee Titans
- Most selections (14): Cleveland Browns
- Fewest selections (5): New Orleans Saints; Carolina Panthers

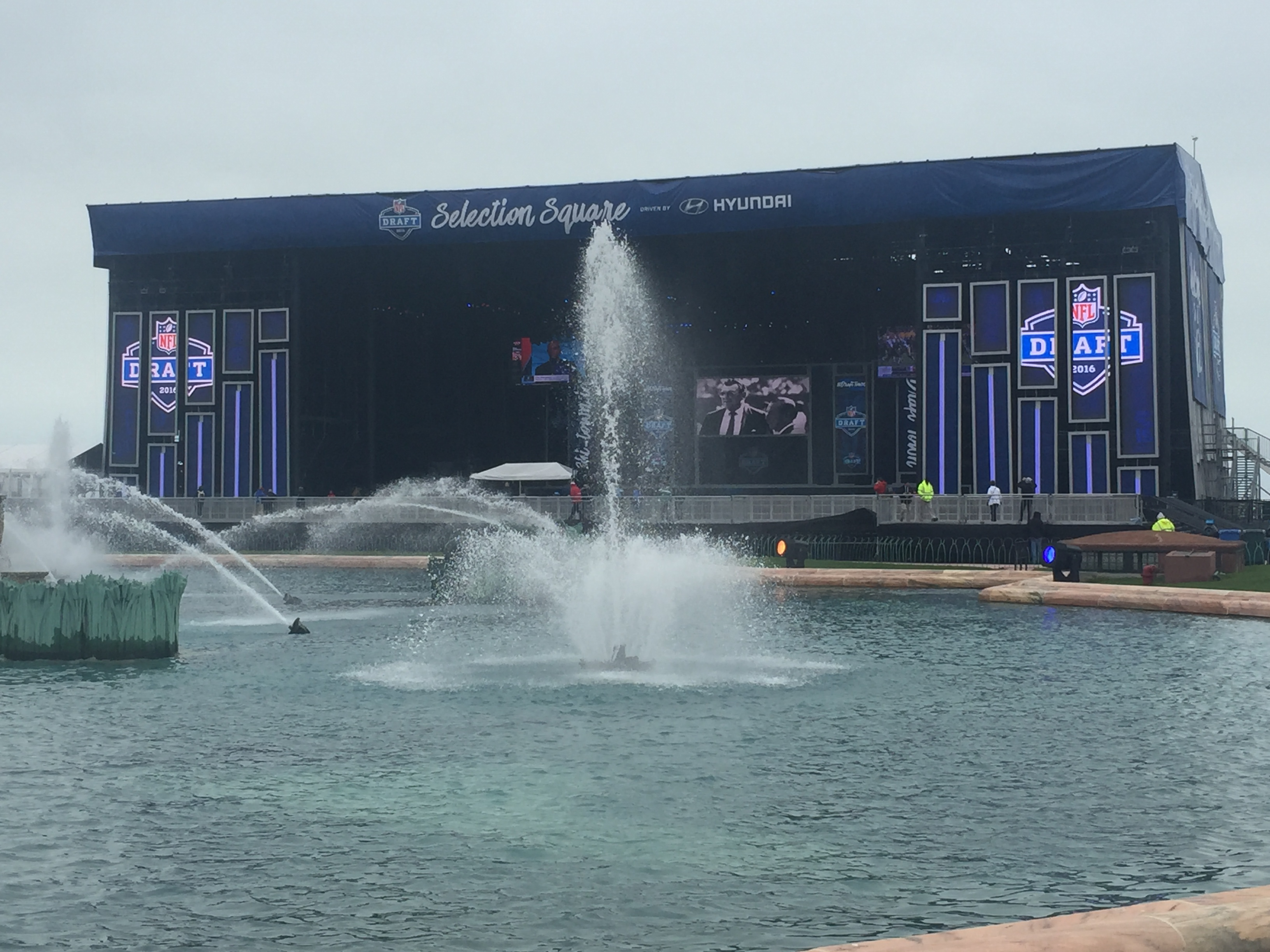
"Selection Square" at Grant Park's Buckingham Fountain

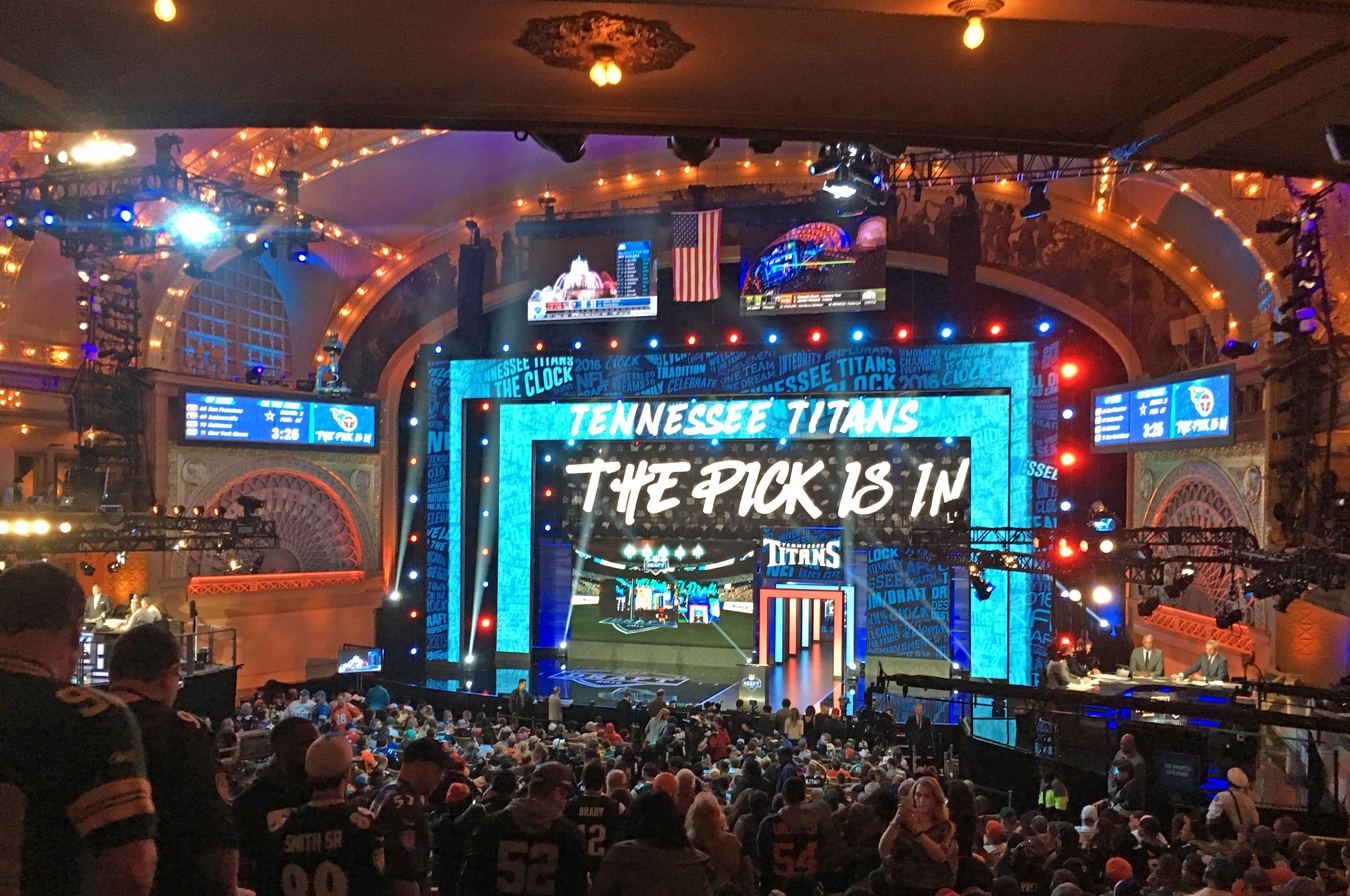
Interior of the Auditorium Theatre during the 2016 NFL draft

The 2016 NFL draft was the 81st annual draft of National Football League (NFL) franchises to select newly eligible American football players. As in 2015, the draft took place at the Auditorium Theatre and Grant Park in Chicago. The draft began with the first round on Thursday, April 28, and ended on Saturday, April 30. The Tennessee Titans, the team with the fewest wins in the NFL for the 2015 season, traded the right to the top pick in the draft to the Los Angeles Rams, the first time the top pick was traded before the draft since 2001 when the San Diego Chargers traded their first pick to the Atlanta Falcons. Ohio State became the second school to have three players drafted in the top ten and to have five players drafted in the first round.

== Early entrants ==
Ninety-six underclassmen announced their intention to enter the 2016 NFL draft as underclassmen, which primarily includes juniors and redshirt sophomores who are forgoing future years of college eligibility. In order to be eligible to enter the draft, players must be at least three years removed from high school. The deadline for underclassmen to declare for the draft was January 18, 2016.

== Overview ==
The following is the breakdown of the 253 players selected by position:

- 36 linebackers
- 31 wide receivers
- 32 cornerbacks
- 22 defensive tackles
- 20 offensive tackles
- 19 running backs
- 19 safeties
- 18 defensive ends
- 15 quarterbacks
- 13 guards
- 11 tight ends
- 8 centers
- 3 fullbacks
- 3 punters
- 1 long snapper
- 1 placekicker

== Player selections ==
*	Compensatory selection
†	Pro Bowler (Note: Players are identified as Pro Bowlers if they were selected for the Pro Bowl at any time in their career.)

Positions key
Offense	Defense	Special teams
QB — Quarterback; RB — Running back; FB — Fullback; WR — Wide receiver; TE — Tight end; OL — Offensive lineman; T — Tackle; G — Guard; C — Center	DL — Defensive lineman; DT — Defensive tackle (Note: Includes nose tackle (NT)); DE — Defensive end; EDGE — Edge rusher; LB — Linebacker (Note: Includes middle linebacker (MLB/MIKE), weakside linebacker (WILL), strongside linebacker (SAM), off-ball linebacker, and outside linebacker (OLB)); DB — Defensive back; CB — Cornerback; S — Safety (Note: Includes free safety (FS) and strong safety (SS))	K — Kicker (Note: Also known as a placekicker (PK)); P — Punter; LS — Long snapper; RS — Return specialist (Note: Includes kickoff and punt returners)

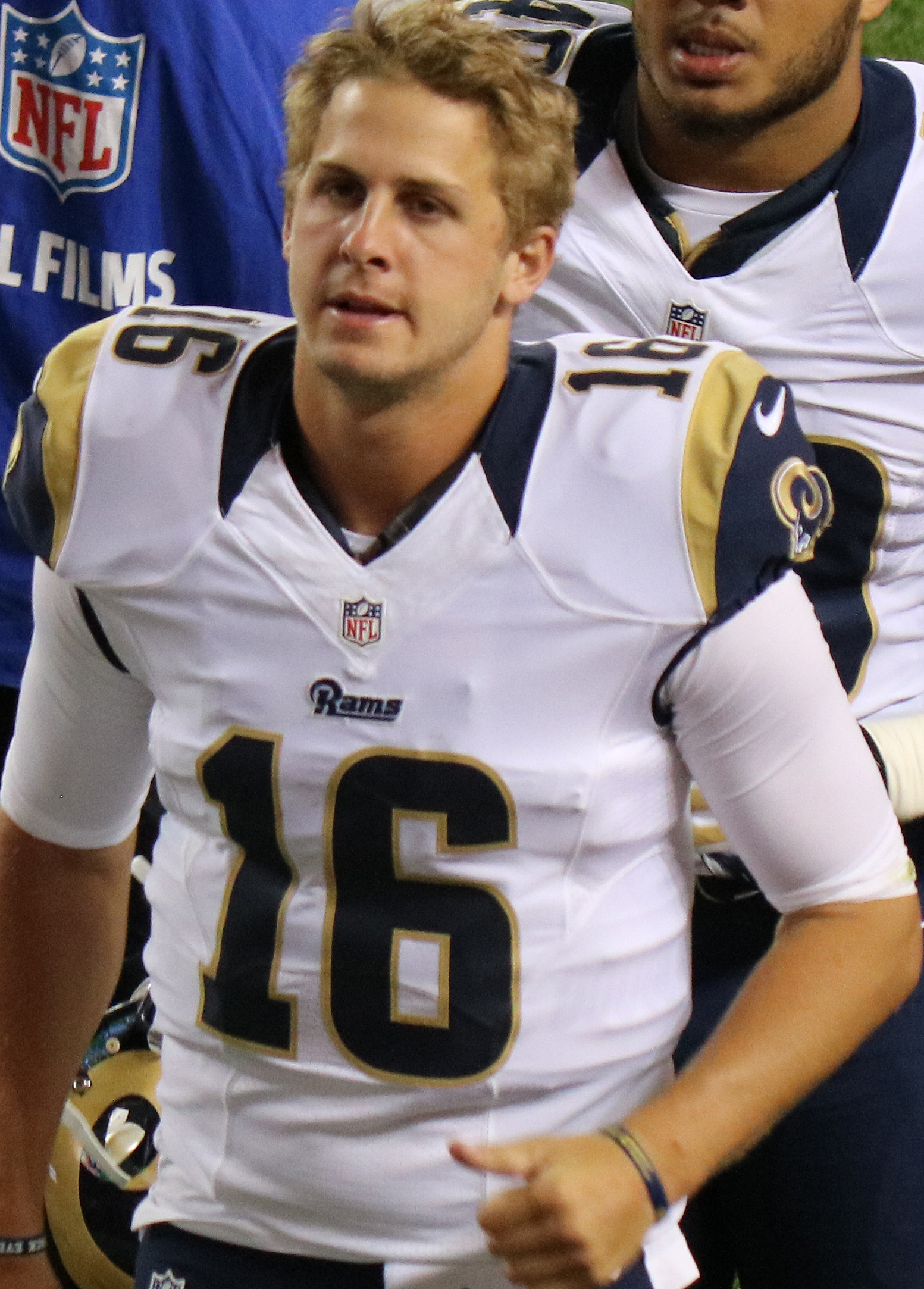
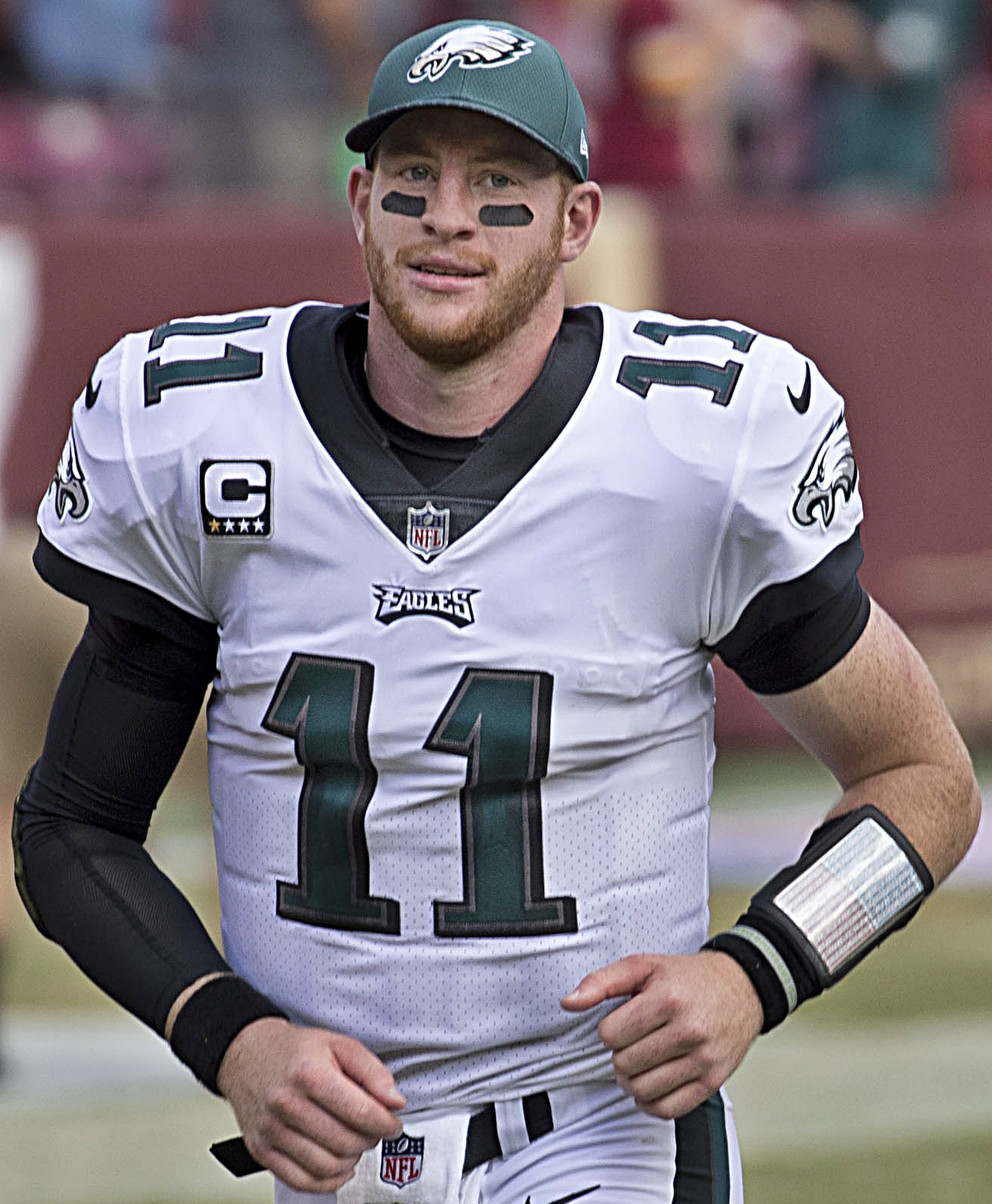
Quarterbacks Jared Goff and Carson Wentz, taken as the top two picks in the draft, both made the Pro Bowl and helped both of their initial teams to Super Bowl appearances. However, both have since been traded.

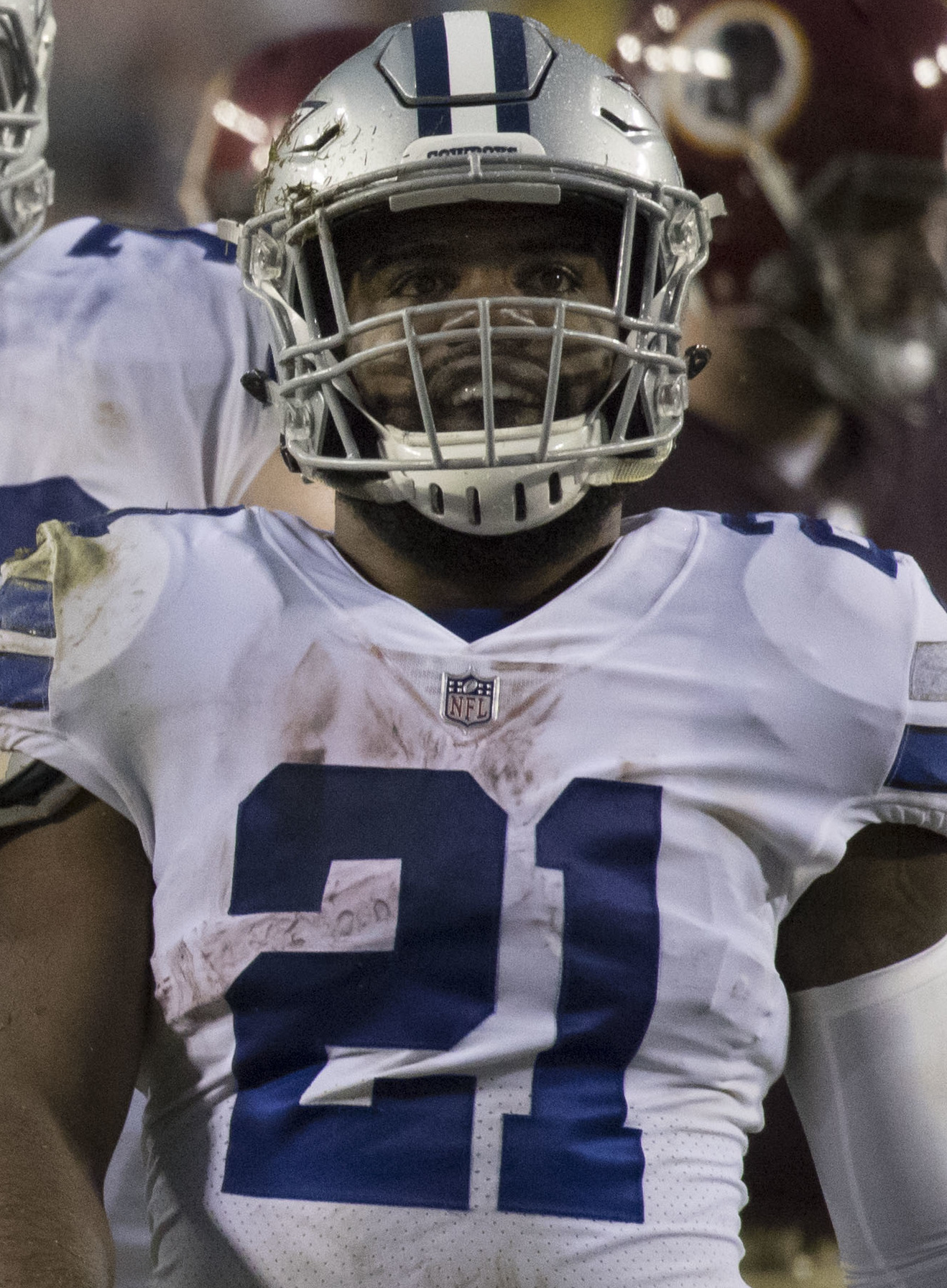
First-round running back Ezekiel Elliott, taken 4th overall by Dallas, is a three-time Pro-Bowler, two-time All-Pro and two-time rushing leader.

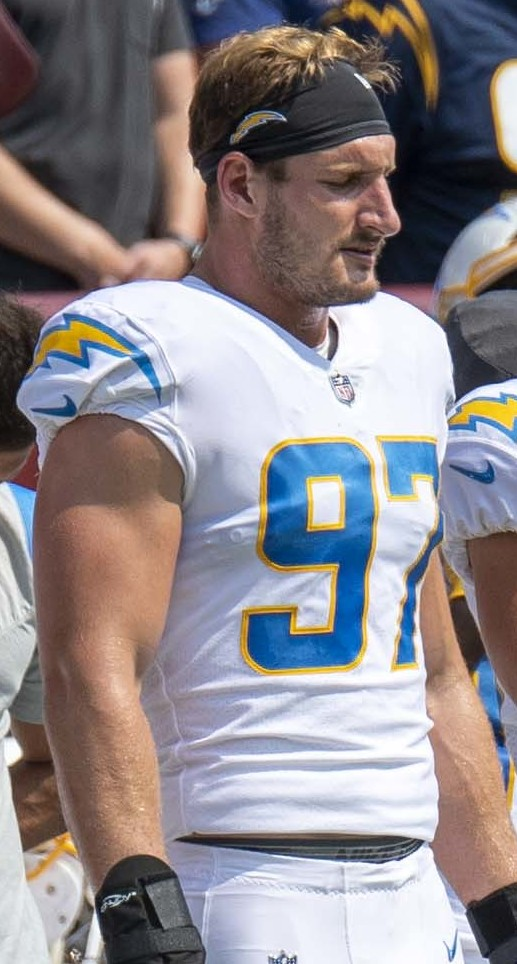
Joey Bosa, selected third overall by San Diego, was the NFL Defensive Rookie of the Year in his first season and has been selected to the Pro Bowl five times.

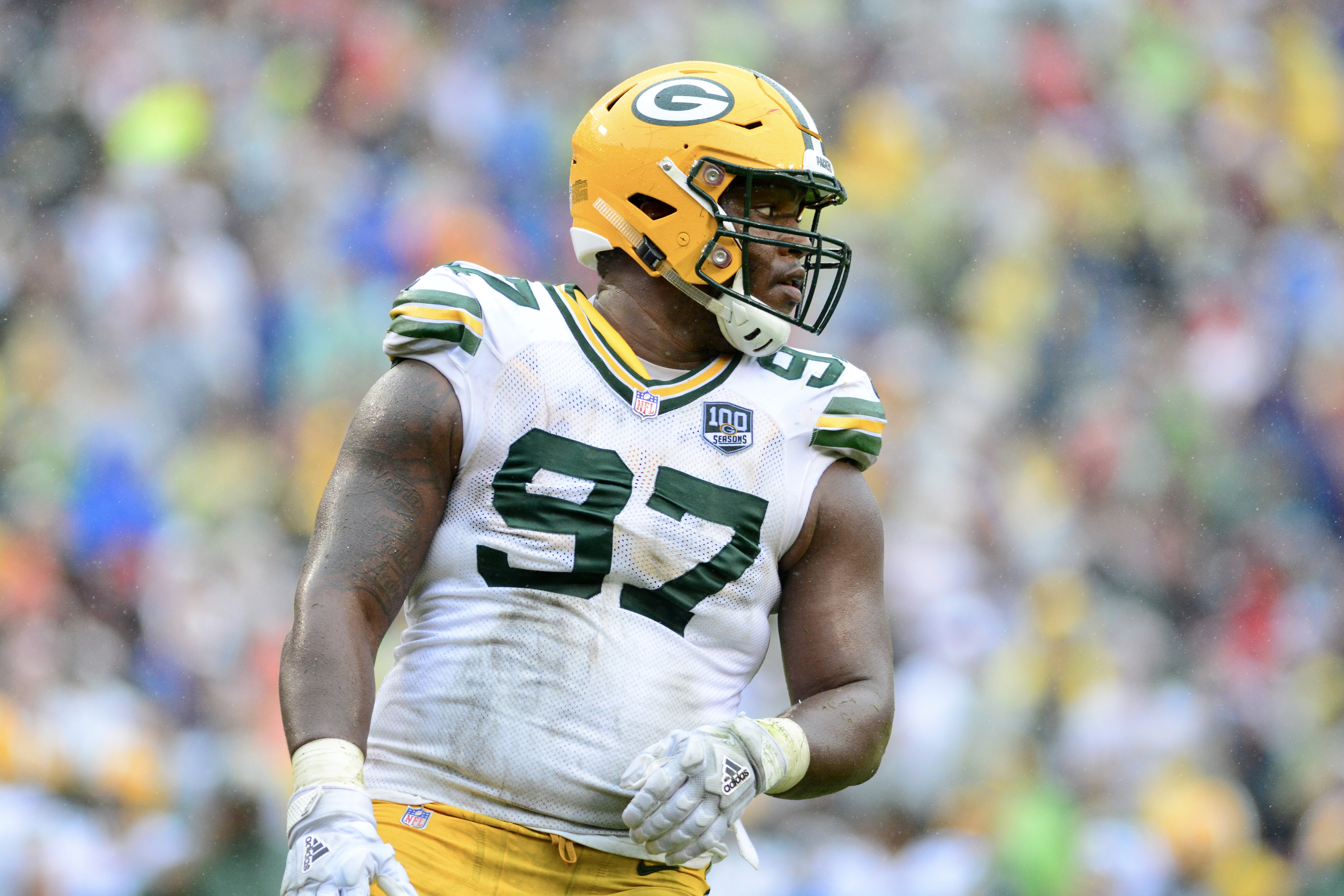
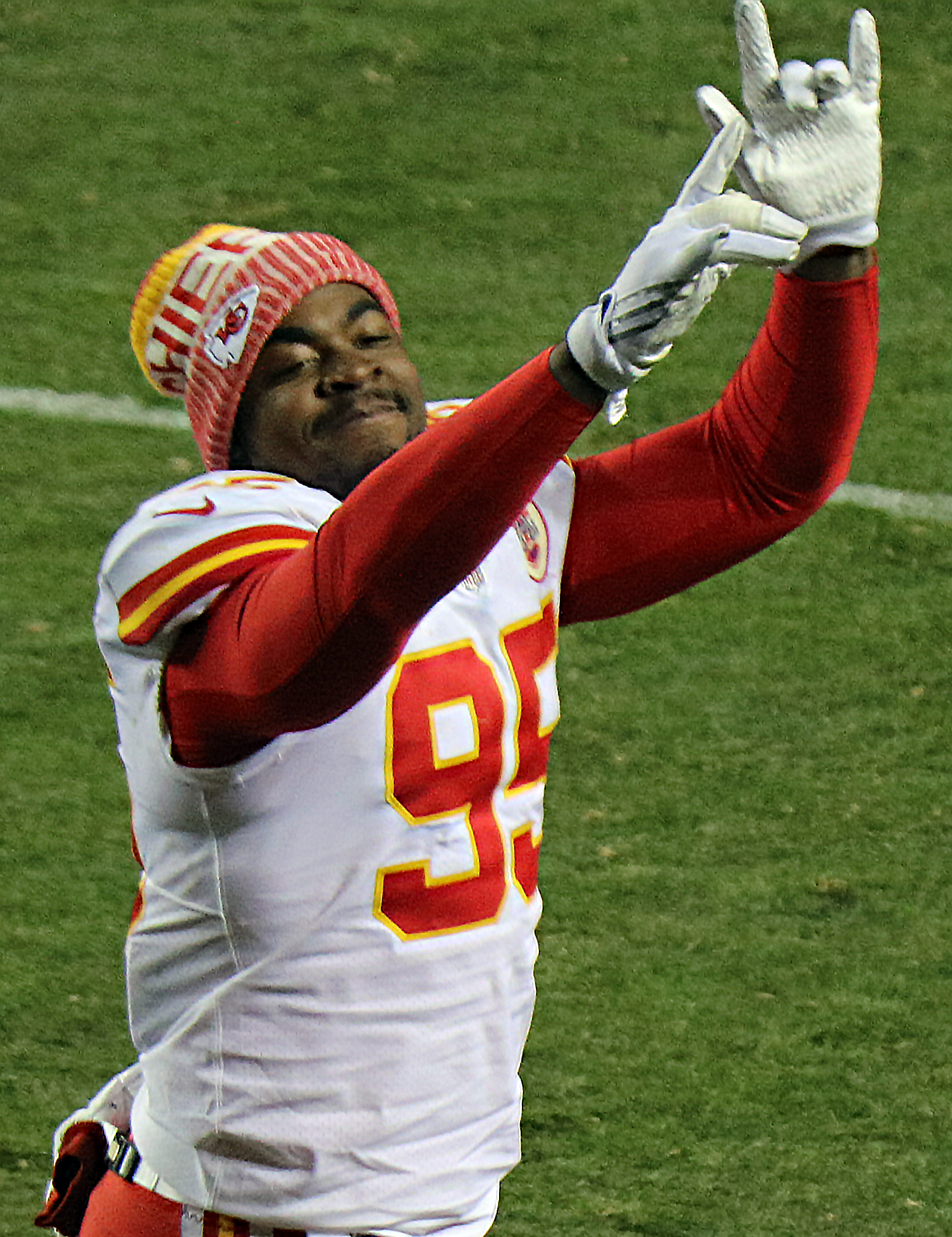
Defensive tackles Kenny Clark (27th overall by Green Bay) and Chris Jones (37th overall by Kansas City) have been named to multiple Pro Bowls.

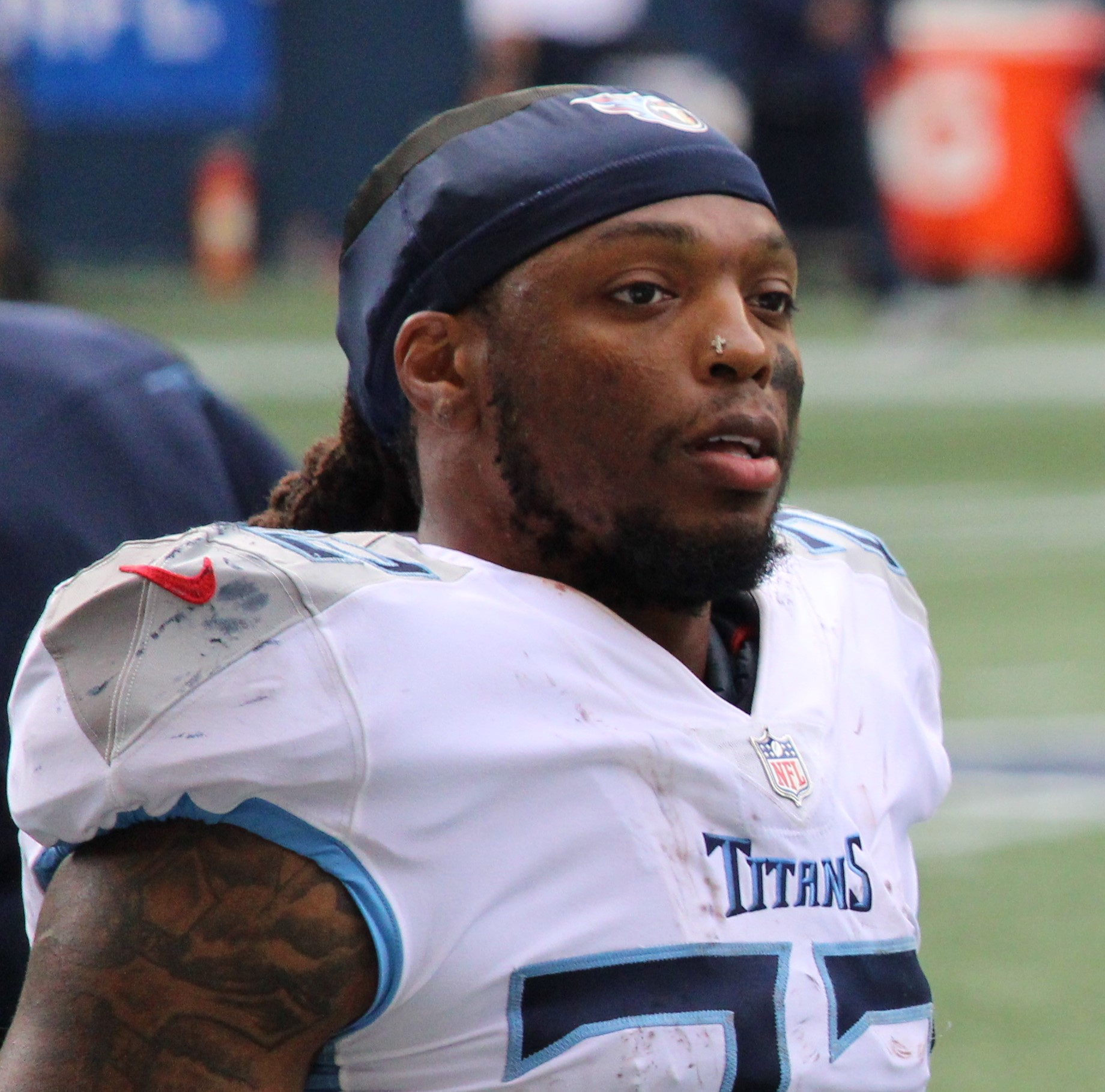
Second-round pick Derrick Henry, taken 45th overall by Tennessee, has broken multiple rushing records and is one of nine members of the 2,000-yard club.

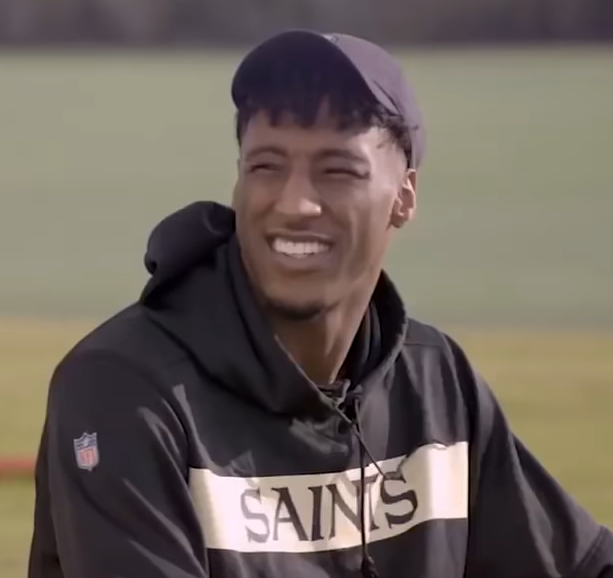
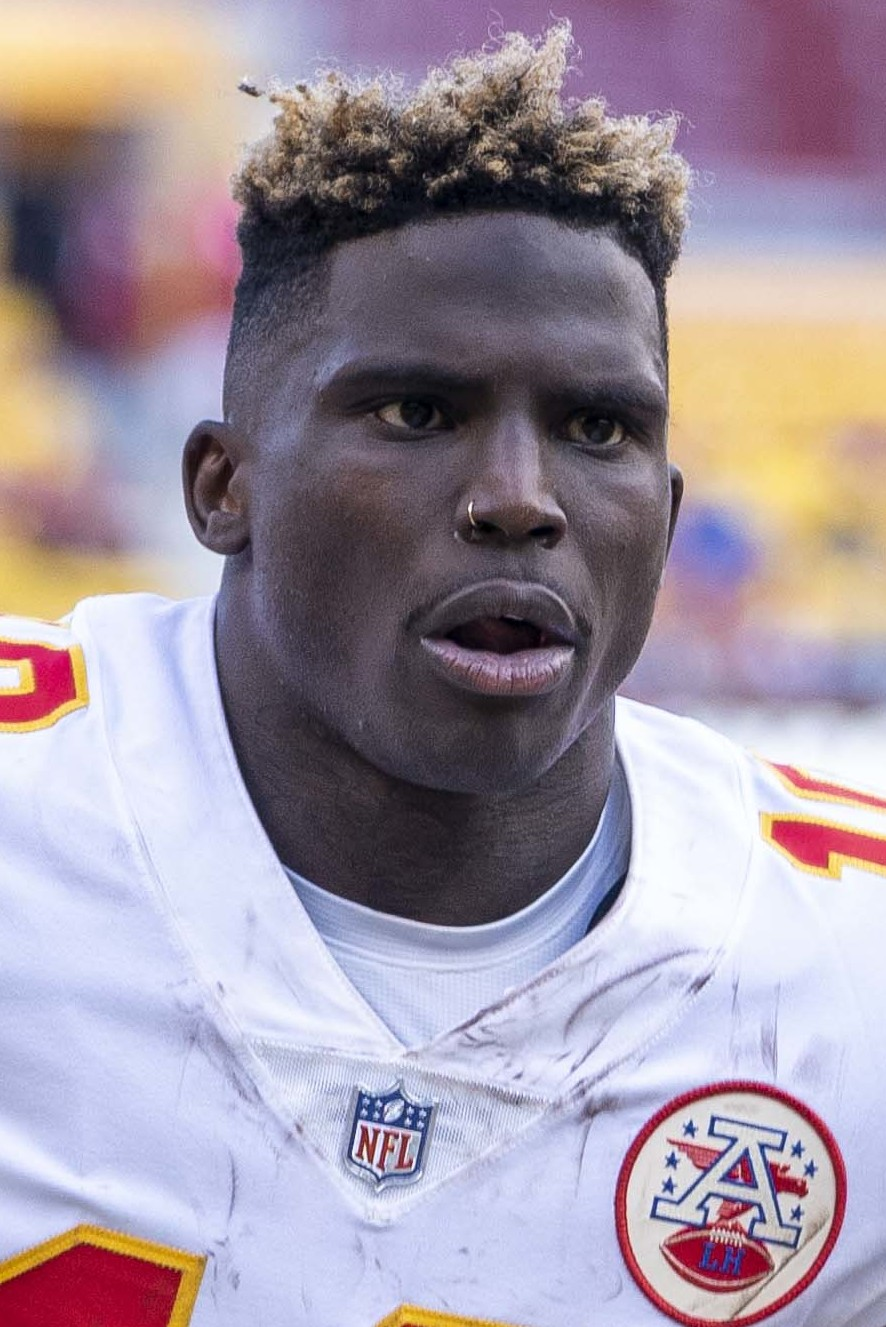
Michael Thomas (top, 47th overall pick by New Orleans) set the record for most receptions by a wide receiver in a single season in 2019, while Tyreek Hill (bottom, 165th selection overall by Kansas City) has been named to six Pro Bowls and the NFL 2010s All-Decade Team.

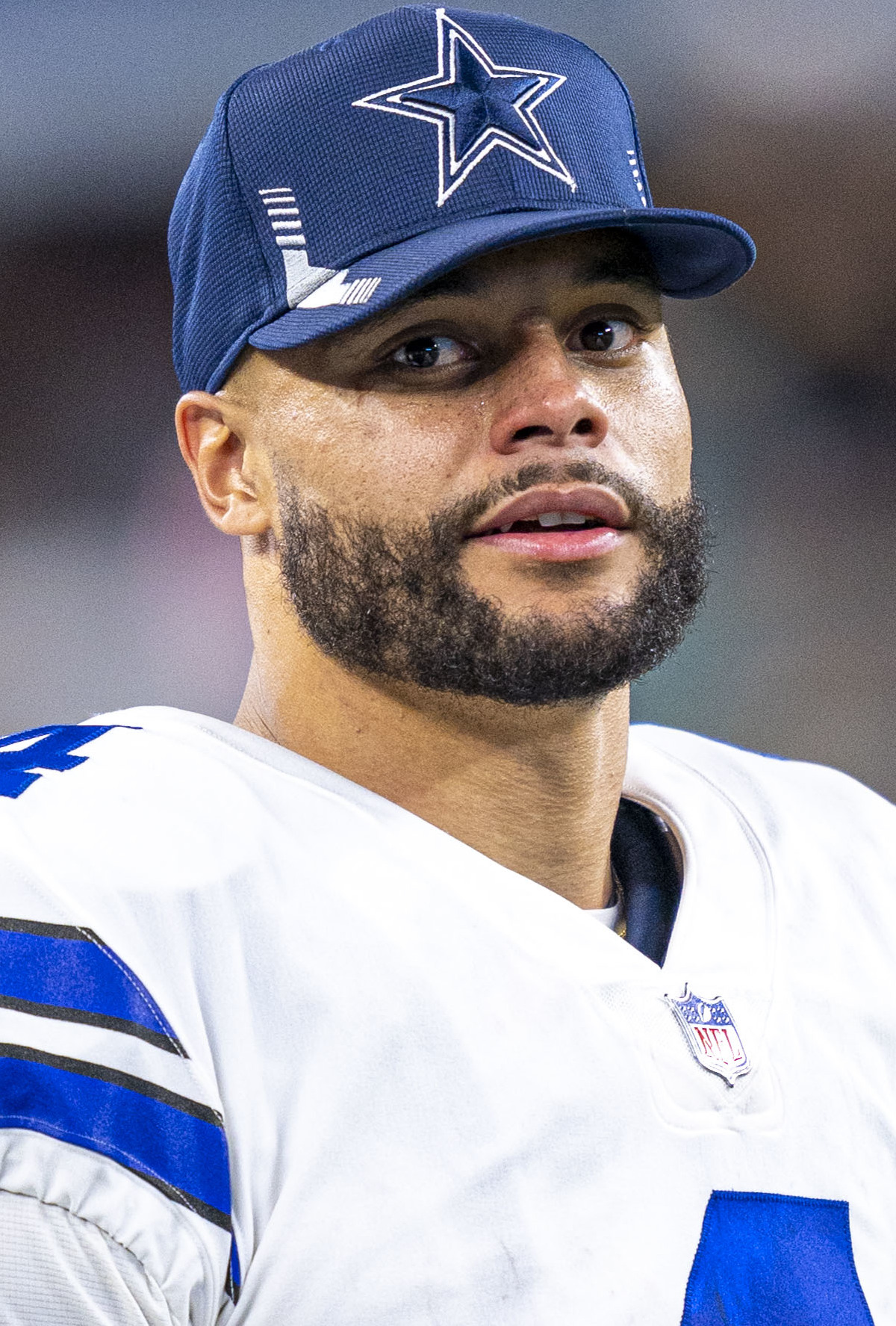
Dak Prescott, a fourth-round pick by Dallas, became the team's starting quarterback in 2016 and won the NFL Offensive Rookie of the Year Award later in the year.

Rnd.	Pick	Team	Player	Pos.	College	Notes
1	1	Los Angeles Rams	Jared Goff ^{†}	QB	California	from Tennessee (Note: No. 1: Tennessee → Los Angeles (PD). Tennessee traded first-, fourth- and sixth-round selections (1st, 113th and 177th overall) to Los Angeles in exchange for a first-round selection, two second-round selections and a third-round selection (15th, 43rd, 45th and 76th overall), and 2017 first- and third-round selections.)
1	2	Philadelphia Eagles	Carson Wentz ^{†}	QB	North Dakota State	from Cleveland (Note: No. 2: Cleveland → Philadelphia (PD). Cleveland traded a first-round selection (2nd overall) and a conditional 2017 fifth-round selection (this selection would be upgraded to a fourth-round compensatory selection if the Browns received one in 2017) to Philadelphia in exchange for first-, third- and fourth-round selections (8th, 77th and 100th overall), a 2017 first-round selection and a 2018 second-round selection.)
1	3	San Diego Chargers	Joey Bosa ^{†}	DE	Ohio State	NFL Defensive Rookie of the Year
1	4	Dallas Cowboys	Ezekiel Elliott ^{†}	RB	Ohio State	
1	5	Jacksonville Jaguars	Jalen Ramsey ^{†}	CB	Florida State	
1	6	Baltimore Ravens	Ronnie Stanley ^{†}	T	Notre Dame	
1	7	San Francisco 49ers	DeForest Buckner ^{†}	DE	Oregon	
1	8	Tennessee Titans	Jack Conklin	T	Michigan State	from Miami via Philadelphia and Cleveland (Note: No. 8: Miami → Philadelphia → Cleveland → Tennessee. Multiple trades: Miami → Philadelphia (PD). Miami traded a first-round selection (8th overall) to Philadelphia in exchange for a first-round selection (13th overall), LB Kiko Alonso and CB Byron Maxwell. Philadelphia → Cleveland (PD). See Round 1: Cleveland → Philadelphia. Cleveland → Tennessee (D). Cleveland traded first- and sixth-round selections (8th and 176th overall) to Tennessee in exchange for first- and third-round selections (15th and 76th overall), and a 2017 second-round selection.)
1	9	Chicago Bears	Leonard Floyd	LB	Georgia	from Tampa Bay (Note: No. 9: Tampa Bay → Chicago (D). Tampa Bay traded a first-round selection (9th overall) to Chicago in exchange for first- and fourth-round selections (11th and 106th overall).)
1	10	New York Giants	Eli Apple	CB	Ohio State	
1	11	Tampa Bay Buccaneers	Vernon Hargreaves	CB	Florida	from Chicago (Note: No. 11: Chicago → Tampa Bay (D). See Round 1: Tampa Bay → Chicago.)
1	12	New Orleans Saints	Sheldon Rankins	DT	Louisville	
1	13	Miami Dolphins	Laremy Tunsil ^{†}	T	Ole Miss	from Philadelphia (Note: No. 13: Philadelphia → Miami (PD). See Round 1: Miami → Philadelphia.)
1	14	Oakland Raiders	Karl Joseph	S	West Virginia	
1	15	Cleveland Browns	Corey Coleman	WR	Baylor	from Los Angeles via Tennessee (Note: No. 15: Los Angeles → Tennessee → Cleveland. Multiple trades: Los Angeles → Tennessee (PD). See Round 1: Tennessee → Los Angeles. Tennessee → Cleveland (D). See Round 1: Cleveland → Tennessee.)
1	16	Detroit Lions	Taylor Decker ^{†}	T	Ohio State	
1	17	Atlanta Falcons	Keanu Neal ^{†}	S	Florida	
1	18	Indianapolis Colts	Ryan Kelly ^{†}	C	Alabama	
1	19	Buffalo Bills	Shaq Lawson	DE	Clemson	
1	20	New York Jets	Darron Lee	LB	Ohio State	
1	21	Houston Texans	Will Fuller	WR	Notre Dame	from Washington (Note: No. 21: Washington → Houston (D). Washington traded a first-round selection (21st overall) to Houston in exchange for a first-round selection (22nd overall) and a 2017 sixth-round selection.)
1	22	Washington Redskins	Josh Doctson	WR	TCU	from Houston (Note: No. 22: Houston → Washington (D). See Round 1: Washington → Houston.)
1	23	Minnesota Vikings	Laquon Treadwell	WR	Ole Miss	
1	24	Cincinnati Bengals	William Jackson III	CB	Houston	
1	25	Pittsburgh Steelers	Artie Burns	CB	Miami (FL)	
1	26	Denver Broncos	Paxton Lynch	QB	Memphis	from Seattle (Note: No. 26: Seattle → Denver (D). Seattle traded a first-round selection (26th overall) to Denver in exchange for first- and third-round selections (31st and 94th overall).)
1	27	Green Bay Packers	Kenny Clark ^{†}	DT	UCLA	
1	28	San Francisco 49ers	Joshua Garnett	G	Stanford	from Kansas City (Note: No. 28: Kansas City → San Francisco (D). Kansas City traded first- and seventh-round selections (28th and 249th overall) to San Francisco in exchange for second-, fourth- and sixth-round selections (37th, 105th and 178th overall).)
1	–	New England Patriots	Selection forfeited (Note: New England forfeited its first-round selection and a 2017 fourth-round selection as a result of Deflategate.)			
1	29	Arizona Cardinals	Robert Nkemdiche	DT	Ole Miss	
1	30	Carolina Panthers	Vernon Butler	DT	Louisiana Tech	
1	31	Seattle Seahawks	Germain Ifedi	T	Texas A&M	from Denver (Note: No. 31: Denver → Seattle (D). See Round 1: Seattle → Denver.)
2	32	Cleveland Browns	Emmanuel Ogbah	DE	Oklahoma State	
2	33	Tennessee Titans	Kevin Dodd	LB	Clemson	
2	34	Dallas Cowboys	Jaylon Smith ^{†}	LB	Notre Dame	
2	35	San Diego Chargers	Hunter Henry	TE	Arkansas	
2	36	Jacksonville Jaguars	Myles Jack	LB	UCLA	from Baltimore (Note: No. 36: Baltimore → Jacksonville (D). Baltimore traded a second-round selection (36th overall) to Jacksonville in exchange for second- and fifth-round selections (38th and 146th overall).)
2	37	Kansas City Chiefs	Chris Jones ^{†}	DT	Mississippi State	from San Francisco (Note: No. 37: San Francisco → Kansas City (D). See Round 1: Kansas City → San Francisco.)
2	38	Miami Dolphins	Xavien Howard ^{†}	CB	Baylor	from Jacksonville via Baltimore (Note: No. 38: Jacksonville → Baltimore → Miami. Multiple trades: Jacksonville → Baltimore (D). See Round 2: Baltimore → Jacksonville. Baltimore → Miami (D).Baltimore traded a second-round selection (38th overall) to Miami in exchange for second- and fourth-round selections (42nd and 107th overall).)
2	39	Tampa Bay Buccaneers	Noah Spence	DE	Eastern Kentucky	
2	40	New York Giants	Sterling Shepard	WR	Oklahoma	
2	41	Buffalo Bills	Reggie Ragland	LB	Alabama	from Chicago (Note: No. 41: Chicago → Buffalo (D). Chicago traded a second-round selection (41st overall) to Buffalo in exchange for second- and fourth-round selections (49th and 117th overall), and a 2017 fourth-round selection. (Note: Wawrow, John (April 29, 2016). "Bills trade up to draft Alabama LB Ragland with 41st pick". The State.))
2	42	Baltimore Ravens	Kamalei Correa	LB	Boise State	from Miami (Note: No. 42: Miami → Baltimore (D). See Round 2: Baltimore → Miami.)
2	43	Tennessee Titans	Austin Johnson	DT	Penn State	from Philadelphia via Los Angeles (Note: No. 43: Philadelphia → Los Angeles → Tennessee. Multiple trades: Philadelphia → Los Angeles (PD). Philadelphia traded a second-round selection (43rd overall), a 2015 fourth-round selection and QB Nick Foles to Los Angeles in exchange for a 2015 fifth-round selection and QB Sam Bradford. The trade also included a conditional fourth-round selection in this year's draft that Philadelphia would have received if Bradford took less than 50 percent of the snaps in 2015; Bradford took the majority of snaps for Philadelphia in 2015, so the fourth-round pick was returned to Los Angeles. Los Angeles → Tennessee (PD). See Round 1: Tennessee → Los Angeles.)
2	44	Oakland Raiders	Jihad Ward	DE	Illinois	
2	45	Tennessee Titans	Derrick Henry ^{†}	RB	Alabama	from Los Angeles (Note: No. 45: Los Angeles → Tennessee (PD). See Round 1: Tennessee → Los Angeles.); 2015 Heisman Trophy winner
2	46	Detroit Lions	A'Shawn Robinson	DT	Alabama	
2	47	New Orleans Saints	Michael Thomas ^{†}	WR	Ohio State	
2	48	Green Bay Packers	Jason Spriggs	T	Indiana	from Indianapolis (Note: No. 48: Indianapolis → Green Bay (D). Indianapolis traded a second-round selection (48th overall) to Green Bay in exchange for second-, fourth- and seventh-round selections (57th, 125th and 248th overall).)
2	49	Seattle Seahawks	Jarran Reed	DT	Alabama	from Buffalo via Chicago (Note: No. 49: Buffalo → Chicago → Seattle. Multiple trades: Buffalo → Chicago (D). See Round 2: Chicago → Buffalo. Chicago → Seattle (D). Chicago traded a second-round selection (49th overall) to Seattle in exchange for second- and fourth-round selections (56th and 124th overall).)
2	50	Houston Texans	Nick Martin	C	Notre Dame	from Atlanta (Note: No. 50: Atlanta → Houston (D). Atlanta traded a second-round selection (50th overall) to Houston in exchange for second- and sixth-round selections (52nd and 195th overall).)
2	51	New York Jets	Christian Hackenberg	QB	Penn State	
2	52	Atlanta Falcons	Deion Jones ^{†}	LB	LSU	from Houston (Note: No. 52: Houston → Atlanta (D). See Round 2: Atlanta → Houston.)
2	53	Washington Redskins	Su'a Cravens	LB	USC	
2	54	Minnesota Vikings	Mackensie Alexander	CB	Clemson	
2	55	Cincinnati Bengals	Tyler Boyd	WR	Pittsburgh	
2	56	Chicago Bears	Cody Whitehair ^{†}	G	Kansas State	from Seattle (Note: No. 56: Seattle → Chicago (D). See Round 2: Chicago → Seattle.)
2	57	Indianapolis Colts	T. J. Green	CB	Clemson	from Green Bay (Note: No. 57: Green Bay → Indianapolis (D). See Round 2: Indianapolis → Green Bay.)
2	58	Pittsburgh Steelers	Sean Davis	S	Maryland	
2	59	Tampa Bay Buccaneers	Roberto Aguayo	K	Florida State	from Kansas City (Note: No. 59: Kansas City → Tampa Bay (D). Kansas City traded a second-round selection (59th overall) to Tampa Bay in exchange for third- and fourth-round selections (74th and 106th overall).)
2	60	New England Patriots	Cyrus Jones	CB	Alabama	
2	61	New Orleans Saints	Vonn Bell	S	Ohio State	from Arizona via New England (Note: No. 61: Arizona → New England → New Orleans. Multiple trades: Arizona → New England (PD). Arizona traded a second-round selection (61st overall) and G Jonathan Cooper to New England in exchange for DE Chandler Jones. New England → New Orleans (D). New England traded a second-round selection (61st overall) to New Orleans in exchange for third- and fourth-round selections (78th and 112th overall).)
2	62	Carolina Panthers	James Bradberry ^{†}	CB	Samford	
2	63	Denver Broncos	Adam Gotsis	DT	Georgia Tech	
3	64	Tennessee Titans	Kevin Byard ^{†}	S	Middle Tennessee	
3	65	Cleveland Browns	Carl Nassib	DE	Penn State	
3	66	San Diego Chargers	Max Tuerk	C	USC	
3	67	Dallas Cowboys	Maliek Collins	DT	Nebraska	
3	68	San Francisco 49ers	Will Redmond	CB	Mississippi State	
3	69	Jacksonville Jaguars	Yannick Ngakoue ^{†}	DE	Maryland	
3	70	Baltimore Ravens	Bronson Kaufusi	DE	BYU	
3	71	New York Giants	Darian Thompson	S	Boise State	
3	72	Chicago Bears	Jonathan Bullard	DT	Florida	
3	73	Miami Dolphins	Kenyan Drake	RB	Alabama	
3	74	Kansas City Chiefs	KeiVarae Russell	CB	Notre Dame	from Tampa Bay (Note: No. 74: Tampa Bay → Kansas City (D). See Round 2: Kansas City → Tampa Bay.)
3	75	Oakland Raiders	Shilique Calhoun	DE	Michigan State	
3	76	Cleveland Browns	Shon Coleman	T	Auburn	from Los Angeles via Tennessee (Note: No. 76: Los Angeles → Tennessee → Cleveland. Multiple trades: Los Angeles → Tennessee (PD). See Round 1: Tennessee → Los Angeles. Tennessee → Cleveland (D). See Round 1: Cleveland → Tennessee.)
3	77	Carolina Panthers	Daryl Worley	CB	West Virginia	from Detroit via Philadelphia and Cleveland (Note: No. 77: Detroit → Philadelphia → Cleveland → Carolina. Multiple trades: Detroit → Philadelphia (PD). Detroit traded a third-round selection (77th overall) to Philadelphia in exchange for a 2015 fourth-round selection. Philadelphia → Cleveland (PD). See Round 1: Cleveland → Philadelphia. Cleveland → Carolina (D). Cleveland traded third- and fifth-round selections (77th and 141st overall) to Carolina in exchange for third-, fourth- and fifth-round selections (93rd, 129th and 168th overall).)
3	78	New England Patriots	Joe Thuney ^{†}	G	NC State	from New Orleans (Note: No. 78: New Orleans → New England (D). See Round 2: New England → New Orleans.)
3	79	Philadelphia Eagles	Isaac Seumalo ^{†}	C	Oregon State	
3	80	Buffalo Bills	Adolphus Washington	DT	Ohio State	
3	81	Atlanta Falcons	Austin Hooper ^{†}	TE	Stanford	
3	82	Indianapolis Colts	Le'Raven Clark	T	Texas Tech	
3	83	New York Jets	Jordan Jenkins	LB	Georgia	
3	84	Washington Redskins	Kendall Fuller	CB	Virginia Tech	
3	85	Houston Texans	Braxton Miller	WR	Ohio State	
3	86	Miami Dolphins	Leonte Carroo	WR	Rutgers	from Minnesota (Note: No. 86: Minnesota → Miami (D). Minnesota traded a third-round selection (86th overall) to Miami in exchange for a sixth-round selection (186th overall), and 2017 third- and fourth-round selections.)
3	87	Cincinnati Bengals	Nick Vigil	LB	Utah State	
3	88	Green Bay Packers	Kyler Fackrell	LB	Utah State	
3	89	Pittsburgh Steelers	Javon Hargrave ^{†}	DT	South Carolina State	
3	90	Seattle Seahawks	C. J. Prosise	RB	Notre Dame	
3	–	Kansas City Chiefs	Selection forfeited. (Note: Kansas City forfeited a third-round selection and a 2017 sixth-round selection for violating the NFL's anti-tampering policy. The team also paid a $250,000 fine.)			
3	91	New England Patriots	Jacoby Brissett	QB	NC State	
3	92	Arizona Cardinals	Brandon Williams	CB	Texas A&M	
3	93	Cleveland Browns	Cody Kessler	QB	USC	from Carolina (Note: No. 93: Carolina → Cleveland (D). See Round 3: Cleveland → Carolina.)
3	94	Seattle Seahawks	Nick Vannett	TE	Ohio State	from Denver (Note: No. 94: Denver → Seattle (PD). See Round 1: Seattle → Denver.)
3*	95	Detroit Lions	Graham Glasgow	C	Michigan	
3*	96	New England Patriots	Vincent Valentine	DT	Nebraska	
3*	97	Seattle Seahawks	Rees Odhiambo	T	Boise State	
3*	98	Denver Broncos	Justin Simmons ^{†}	S	Boston College	
4	99	Cleveland Browns	Joe Schobert ^{†}	LB	Wisconsin	
4	100	Oakland Raiders	Connor Cook	QB	Michigan State	from Tennessee via Philadelphia and Cleveland (Note: No. 100: Tennessee → Philadelphia → Cleveland → Oakland. Multiple trades: Tennessee → Philadelphia (PD). Tennessee traded a fourth-round selection (100th overall) to Philadelphia in exchange for a fourth-round selection (113th overall) and RB DeMarco Murray. Philadelphia → Cleveland (PD). See Round 1: Cleveland → Philadelphia. Cleveland → Oakland (D). Cleveland traded a fourth-round selection (100th overall) to Oakland in exchange for fourth- and fifth-round selections (114th and 154th overall).)
4	101	Dallas Cowboys	Charles Tapper	DE	Oklahoma	
4	102	San Diego Chargers	Joshua Perry	LB	Ohio State	
4	103	Jacksonville Jaguars	Sheldon Day	DT	Notre Dame	
4	104	Baltimore Ravens	Tavon Young	CB	Temple	
4	105	Kansas City Chiefs	Parker Ehinger	G	Cincinnati	from San Francisco (Note: No. 105: San Francisco → Kansas City (D). See Round 1: Kansas City → San Francisco.)
4	106	Kansas City Chiefs	Eric Murray	CB	Minnesota	from Chicago via Tampa Bay (Note: No. 106: Chicago → Tampa Bay → Kansas City. Multiple trades: Chicago → Tampa Bay (D). See Round 1: Tampa Bay → Chicago. Tampa Bay → Kansas City (D). See Round 2: Kansas City → Tampa Bay.)
4	107	Baltimore Ravens	Chris Moore	WR	Cincinnati	from Miami (Note: No. 107: Miami → Baltimore (D). See Round 2: Baltimore → Miami.)
4	108	Tampa Bay Buccaneers	Ryan Smith	CB	North Carolina Central	
4	109	New York Giants	B. J. Goodson	LB	Clemson	
4	110	Los Angeles Rams	Tyler Higbee	TE	Western Kentucky	
4	111	Detroit Lions	Miles Killebrew ^{†}	S	Southern Utah	
4	112	New England Patriots	Malcolm Mitchell	WR	Georgia	from New Orleans (Note: No. 112: New Orleans → New England (D). See Round 2: New England → New Orleans.)
4	113	Chicago Bears	Nick Kwiatkoski	LB	West Virginia	from Philadelphia via Tennessee and Los Angeles (Note: No. 113: Philadelphia → Tennessee → Los Angeles → Chicago. Multiple trades: Philadelphia → Tennessee (PD). See Round 4: Tennessee → Philadelphia. Tennessee → Los Angeles (PD). See Round 1: Tennessee → Los Angeles. Los Angeles → Chicago (D). Los Angeles traded a fourth-round selection (113th overall) to Chicago in exchange for fourth- and sixth-round selections (117th and 206th overall).)
4	114	Cleveland Browns	Ricardo Louis	WR	Auburn	from Oakland (Note: No. 114: Oakland → Cleveland (D). See Round 4: Cleveland → Oakland.)
4	115	Atlanta Falcons	De'Vondre Campbell	LB	Minnesota	
4	116	Indianapolis Colts	Hassan Ridgeway	DT	Texas	
4	117	Los Angeles Rams	Pharoh Cooper ^{†}	WR	South Carolina	from Buffalo via Chicago (Note: No. 117: Buffalo → Chicago → Los Angeles. Multiple trades: Buffalo → Chicago (D). See Round 2: Chicago → Buffalo. Chicago → Los Angeles (D). See Round 4: Los Angeles → Chicago.)
4	118	New York Jets	Juston Burris	CB	NC State	
4	119	Houston Texans	Tyler Ervin	RB	San Jose State	
4	120	New Orleans Saints	David Onyemata	DT	Manitoba	from Washington (Note: No. 120: Washington → New Orleans (D). Washington traded a fourth-round selection (120th overall) to New Orleans in exchange for a fifth-round selection (152nd overall) and a 2017 fifth-round selection.)
4	121	Minnesota Vikings	Willie Beavers	G	Western Michigan	
4	122	Cincinnati Bengals	Andrew Billings	DT	Baylor	
4	123	Pittsburgh Steelers	Jerald Hawkins	T	LSU	
4	124	Chicago Bears	Deon Bush	S	Miami (FL)	from Seattle (Note: No. 124: Seattle → Chicago (D). See Round 2: Chicago → Seattle.)
4	125	Indianapolis Colts	Antonio Morrison	LB	Florida	from Green Bay (Note: No. 125: Green Bay → Indianapolis (D). See Round 2: Indianapolis → Green Bay.)
4	126	Kansas City Chiefs	Demarcus Robinson	WR	Florida	
4	127	Chicago Bears	Deiondre' Hall	S	Northern Iowa	from New England (Note: No. 127: New England → Chicago (PD). New England traded a fourth-round selection to Chicago in exchange for a sixth-round selection (204th overall) and TE Martellus Bennett.)
4	128	Arizona Cardinals	Evan Boehm	C	Missouri	
4	129	Cleveland Browns	Derrick Kindred	S	TCU	from Carolina (Note: No. 129: Carolina → Cleveland (D). See Round 3: Cleveland → Carolina.)
4	130	Baltimore Ravens	Alex Lewis	T	Nebraska	from Denver (Note: No. 130: Denver → Baltimore (PD). Denver traded a fourth-round selection (130th overall) to Baltimore in exchange for a fifth-round selection (144th overall) and C Gino Gradkowski.)
4*	131	Green Bay Packers	Blake Martinez	LB	Stanford	
4*	132	Baltimore Ravens	Willie Henry	DT	Michigan	
4*	133	San Francisco 49ers	Rashard Robinson	CB	LSU	
4*	134	Baltimore Ravens	Kenneth Dixon	RB	Louisiana Tech	
4*	135	Dallas Cowboys	Dak Prescott ^{†}	QB	Mississippi State	NFL Offensive Rookie of the Year
4*	136	Denver Broncos	Devontae Booker	RB	Utah	
4*	137	Green Bay Packers	Dean Lowry	DE	Northwestern	
4*	138	Cleveland Browns	Seth DeValve	TE	Princeton	
4*	139	Buffalo Bills	Cardale Jones	QB	Ohio State	Extra compensatory pick authorized by NFLMC and NFLPA
5	140	Tennessee Titans	Tajae Sharpe	WR	UMass	
5	141	Carolina Panthers	Zack Sanchez	CB	Oklahoma	from Cleveland (Note: No. 141: Cleveland → Carolina (D). See Round 3: Cleveland → Carolina.)
5	142	San Francisco 49ers	Ronald Blair	DE	Appalachian State	from San Diego (Note: No. 142: San Diego → San Francisco (PD). San Diego traded a fifth-round selection (142nd overall), and 2015 first- and fourth-round selections to San Francisco in exchange for a 2015 first-round selection.)
5	143	Oakland Raiders	DeAndré Washington	RB	Texas Tech	from Dallas (Note: No. 143: Dallas → Oakland (PD). Dallas traded a conditional fifth-round selection (143rd overall) to Oakland in exchange for a sixth-round selection (189th overall) and WR Brice Butler. Oakland received the pick after the Cowboys had Butler on their 53-man roster for at least six games.)
5	144	Denver Broncos	Connor McGovern	G	Missouri	from Baltimore (Note: No. 144: Baltimore → Denver (PD). See Round 4: Denver → Baltimore.)
5	145	San Francisco 49ers	John Theus	T	Georgia	
5	146	Baltimore Ravens	Matthew Judon ^{†}	DE	Grand Valley State	from Jacksonville (Note: No. 146: Jacksonville → Baltimore (D). See Round 2: Baltimore → Jacksonville.)
5	147	Seattle Seahawks	Quinton Jefferson	DT	Maryland	from Miami via New England (Note: No. 147: Miami → New England → Seattle. Multiple trades: Miami → New England (D). Miami traded a fifth-round selection (147th overall) to New England in exchange for two sixth-round selections and a seventh-round selection (196th, 204th and 250th overall). New England → Seattle (D). New England traded fifth- and seventh-round selections (147th and 243rd overall) to Seattle in exchange for a sixth-round selection (225th overall) and a 2017 fourth-round selection.)
5	148	Tampa Bay Buccaneers	Caleb Benenoch	T	UCLA	
5	149	New York Giants	Paul Perkins	RB	UCLA	
5	150	Chicago Bears	Jordan Howard ^{†}	RB	Indiana	
5	151	Detroit Lions	Joe Dahl	G	Washington State	
5	152	Washington Redskins	Matt Ioannidis	DT	Temple	from New Orleans (Note: No. 152: New Orleans → Washington (D). See Round 4: Washington → New Orleans.)
5	153	Philadelphia Eagles	Wendell Smallwood	RB	West Virginia	
5	154	Cleveland Browns	Jordan Payton	WR	UCLA	from Oakland (Note: No. 154: Oakland → Cleveland (D). See Round 4: Cleveland → Oakland.)
5	–	Los Angeles Rams	Selection forfeited during the 2015 Supplemental draft. (Note: Los Angeles forfeited its fifth-round selection after selecting OT Isaiah Battle in the 2015 Supplemental draft.)			
5	155	Indianapolis Colts	Joe Haeg	T	North Dakota State	
5	156	Buffalo Bills	Jonathan Williams	RB	Arkansas	
5	–	Atlanta Falcons	Selection forfeited. (Note: Atlanta forfeited its fifth-round selection as punishment for piping artificial crowd noise into the Georgia Dome during the 2013 and 2014 seasons.)			
5	157	Tennessee Titans	LeShaun Sims	CB	Southern Utah	from NY Jets via Denver (Note: No. 157: NY Jets → Denver → Tennessee. Multiple trades: NY Jets → Denver (PD). NY Jets traded a fifth-round selection (157th overall) to Denver in exchange for a seventh-round selection (235th overall) and OT Ryan Clady. (Note: "Broncos trade Clady to Jets in exchange for 78 draft spots". KUSA. April 9, 2016.) Denver → Tennessee (D). Denver traded fifth- and seventh-round selections (157th and 253rd overall) to Tennessee in exchange for a sixth-round selection (176th overall) and a 2017 sixth-round selection.)
5	158	New York Jets	Brandon Shell	T	South Carolina	from Washington (Note: No. 158: Washington → NY Jets (D). Washington traded a fifth-round selection (158th overall) to the NY Jets in exchange for a 2017 fourth-round selection.)
5	159	Houston Texans	K. J. Dillon	S	West Virginia	
5	160	Minnesota Vikings	Kentrell Brothers	LB	Missouri	
5	161	Cincinnati Bengals	Christian Westerman	G	Arizona State	
5	162	Kansas City Chiefs	Kevin Hogan	QB	Stanford	from Seattle (Note: No. 162: Seattle → Kansas City (PD). Seattle traded a fifth-round selection (162nd overall) to Kansas City in exchange for S Kelcie McCray.)
5	163	Green Bay Packers	Trevor Davis	WR	California	
5	164	Philadelphia Eagles	Halapoulivaati Vaitai	T	TCU	from Pittsburgh (Note: No. 164: Pittsburgh → Philadelphia (PD). Pittsburgh traded a conditional fifth-round selection to Philadelphia in exchange for CB Brandon Boykin. The selection would have become a fourth-rounder if Boykin played 60% of the snaps during the season.)
5	165	Kansas City Chiefs	Tyreek Hill ^{†}	WR	West Alabama	
5	166	Houston Texans	D. J. Reader	DT	Clemson	from New England (Note: No. 166: New England → Houston (PD). New England traded a fifth-round selection (166th overall) to Houston in exchange for a sixth-round selection (196th overall) and WR Keshawn Martin.)
5	167	Arizona Cardinals	Marqui Christian	S	Midwestern State	
5	168	Cleveland Browns	Spencer Drango	T	Baylor	from Carolina (Note: No. 168: Carolina → Cleveland (D). See Round 3: Cleveland → Carolina.)
5	169	Detroit Lions	Antwione Williams	LB	Georgia Southern	from Denver (Note: No. 169: Denver → Detroit (PD). Denver traded a fifth-round selection (169th overall), 2015 first- and fifth-round selections, and OL Manny Ramirez to Detroit in exchange for a 2015 first-round selection.)
5*	170	Arizona Cardinals	Cole Toner	T	Harvard	
5*	171	Seattle Seahawks	Alex Collins	RB	Arkansas	
5*	172	Cleveland Browns	Rashard Higgins	WR	Colorado State	
5*	173	Cleveland Browns	Trey Caldwell	CB	Louisiana–Monroe	
5*	174	San Francisco 49ers	Fahn Cooper	T	Ole Miss	
5*	175	San Diego Chargers	Jatavis Brown	LB	Akron	
6	176	Denver Broncos	Andy Janovich	FB	Nebraska	from Cleveland via Tennessee (Note: No. 176: Cleveland → Tennessee → Denver. Multiple trades: Cleveland → Tennessee (D). See Round 1: Cleveland → Tennessee. Tennessee → Denver (D). See Round 5: Denver → Tennessee.)
6	177	Los Angeles Rams	Temarrick Hemingway	TE	South Carolina State	from Tennessee (Note: No. 177: Tennessee → Los Angeles (PD). See Round 1: Tennessee → Los Angeles.)
6	178	Kansas City Chiefs	D. J. White	CB	Georgia Tech	from Dallas via San Francisco (Note: No. 178: Dallas → San Francisco → Kansas City. Multiple trades: Dallas → San Francisco (PD). Dallas traded a sixth-round selection (178th overall) to San Francisco in exchange for a 2015 seventh-round selection. San Francisco → Kansas City (D). See Round 1: Kansas City → San Francisco.)
6	179	San Diego Chargers	Drew Kaser	P	Texas A&M	
6	180	Minnesota Vikings	Moritz Böhringer	WR		from San Francisco (Note: No. 180: San Francisco → Minnesota (PD). San Francisco traded a sixth-round selection (180th overall) and C Nick Easton to Minnesota in exchange for LB Gerald Hodges.). First European player drafted without playing college football in NFL history; drafted from the GFL
6	181	Jacksonville Jaguars	Tyrone Holmes	DE	Montana	
6	182	Baltimore Ravens	Keenan Reynolds	WR	Navy	
6	183	Tampa Bay Buccaneers	Devante Bond	LB	Oklahoma	
6	184	New York Giants	Jerell Adams	TE	South Carolina	
6	185	Chicago Bears	DeAndre Houston-Carson	CB	William & Mary	
6	186	Miami Dolphins	Jakeem Grant ^{†}	WR	Texas Tech	from Miami via Minnesota (Note: No. 186: Miami → Minnesota → Miami. Multiple trades: Miami → Minnesota (D). See Round 3: Minnesota → Miami. Minnesota → Miami (D). Minnesota traded a sixth-round selection (186th overall) to Miami in exchange for sixth- and seventh-round selections (196th and 227th overall).)
6	187	Washington Redskins	Nate Sudfeld	QB	Indiana	from New Orleans (Note: No. 187: New Orleans → Washington (PD). New Orleans traded a sixth-round selection (187th overall) and a 2015 sixth-round selection to Washington in exchange for a 2015 fifth-round selection.)
6	188	Minnesota Vikings	David Morgan II	TE	UTSA	from Philadelphia (Note: No. 188: Philadelphia → Minnesota (D). Philadelphia traded a sixth-round selection (188th overall) to Minnesota in exchange for sixth- and seventh-round selections (196th and 240th overall).)
6	189	Dallas Cowboys	Anthony Brown	CB	Purdue	from Oakland (Note: No. 189: Oakland → Dallas (PD). See Round 5: Dallas → Oakland.)
6	190	Los Angeles Rams	Josh Forrest	LB	Kentucky	
6	191	Detroit Lions	Jake Rudock	QB	Michigan	
6	192	Buffalo Bills	Kolby Listenbee	WR	TCU	
6	193	Tennessee Titans	Sebastian Tretola	G	Arkansas	from Atlanta (Note: No. 193: Atlanta → Tennessee (PD). Atlanta traded a sixth-round selection (193rd overall) to Tennessee in exchange for a conditional future selection and G Andy Levitre.)
6	194	Oakland Raiders	Cory James	LB	Colorado State	from Indianapolis (Note: No. 194: Indianapolis → Oakland (PD). Indianapolis traded a sixth-round selection (194th overall) to Oakland in exchange for LB Sio Moore.)
6	195	Atlanta Falcons	Wes Schweitzer	G	San Jose State	from NY Jets via Houston (Note: No. 195: NY Jets → Houston → Atlanta. Multiple trades: NY Jets → Houston (PD). The NY Jets traded a conditional seventh-round selection in the 2016 draft to Houston in exchange for QB Ryan Fitzpatrick. The seventh-round pick could have become a sixth-rounder based on Fitzpatrick's playing time. Houston → Atlanta (D). See Round 2: Atlanta → Houston.)
6	196	Philadelphia Eagles	Blake Countess	CB	Auburn	from Houston via New England, Miami and Minnesota (Note: No. 196: Houston → New England → Miami → Minnesota → Philadelphia. Multiple trades: Houston → New England (PD). See Round 5: New England → Houston. New England → Miami (D). See Round 5: Miami → New England. Miami → Minnesota (D). See Round 6: Minnesota → Miami. Minnesota → Philadelphia (D). See Round 6: Philadelphia → Minnesota.)
6	197	Tampa Bay Buccaneers	Dan Vitale	FB	Northwestern	from Washington (Note: No. 197: Washington → Tampa Bay (PD). Washington traded a sixth-round selection (197th overall) to Tampa Bay in exchange for a seventh-round selection (232nd overall) and S Dashon Goldson.)
6	198	San Diego Chargers	Derek Watt	FB	Wisconsin	from Minnesota (Note: No. 198: Minnesota → San Diego (PD). Minnesota traded a sixth-round selection (198th overall) to San Diego in exchange for G Jeremiah Sirles.)
6	199	Cincinnati Bengals	Cody Core	WR	Ole Miss	
6	200	Green Bay Packers	Kyle Murphy	T	Stanford	
6	201	Jacksonville Jaguars	Brandon Allen	QB	Arkansas	from Pittsburgh (Note: No. 201: Pittsburgh → Jacksonville (PD). Pittsburgh traded a sixth-round selection (201st overall) to Jacksonville in exchange for K Josh Scobee.)
6	202	Detroit Lions	Anthony Zettel	DE	Penn State	from Seattle (Note: No. 202: Seattle → Detroit (PD). Seattle traded a sixth-round selection (202nd overall) to Detroit in exchange for CB Mohammed Seisay.)
6	203	Kansas City Chiefs	Dadi Nicolas	LB	Virginia Tech	
6	204	Miami Dolphins	Jordan Lucas	S	Penn State	from New England via Chicago and New England (Note: No. 204: New England → Chicago → New England → Miami. Multiple trades: New England → Chicago (PD). New England traded a sixth-round selection (204th overall) to Chicago in exchange for LB Jon Bostic. Chicago → New England (PD). See Round 4: New England → Chicago New England → Miami (D). See Round 5: Miami → New England)
6	205	Arizona Cardinals	Harlan Miller	CB	Southeastern Louisiana	
6	206	Los Angeles Rams	Mike Thomas	WR	Southern Miss	from Carolina via Chicago (Note: No. 206: Carolina → Chicago → Los Angeles. Multiple trades: Carolina → Chicago (PD). Carolina traded a sixth-round selection (206th overall) to Chicago in exchange for DE Jared Allen. Chicago → Los Angeles (D). See Round 4: Los Angeles → Chicago.)
6	207	San Francisco 49ers	Jeff Driskel	QB	Louisiana Tech	from Denver (Note: No. 207: Denver → San Francisco (PD). Denver traded a sixth-round selection (207th overall) and a 2017 sixth-round selection to San Francisco in exchange for a seventh-round selection (228th overall) and TE Vernon Davis.)
6*	208	New England Patriots	Kamu Grugier-Hill	LB	Eastern Illinois	
6*	209	Baltimore Ravens	Maurice Canady	CB	Virginia	
6*	210	Detroit Lions	Jimmy Landes	LS	Baylor	
6*	211	San Francisco 49ers	Kelvin Taylor	RB	Florida	
6*	212	Dallas Cowboys	Kavon Frazier	S	Central Michigan	
6*	213	San Francisco 49ers	Aaron Burbridge	WR	Michigan State	
6*	214	New England Patriots	Elandon Roberts	LB	Houston	
6*	215	Seattle Seahawks	Joey Hunt	C	TCU	
6*	216	Dallas Cowboys	Darius Jackson	RB	Eastern Michigan	
6*	217	Dallas Cowboys	Rico Gathers	TE	Baylor	Did not play football at Baylor; played as a PF for Baylor basketball.
6*	218	Buffalo Bills	Kevon Seymour	CB	USC	
6*	219	Denver Broncos	Will Parks	S	Arizona	
6*	220	Pittsburgh Steelers	Travis Feeney	LB	Washington	
6*	221	New England Patriots	Ted Karras	G	Illinois	
7	222	Tennessee Titans	Aaron Wallace Jr.	LB	UCLA	
7	223	Miami Dolphins	Brandon Doughty	QB	Western Kentucky	from Cleveland (Note: No. 223: Cleveland → Miami (D). Cleveland traded a seventh-round selection (223rd overall) to Miami in exchange for a seventh-round selection (250th overall) and CB Jamar Taylor.)
7	224	San Diego Chargers	Donavon Clark	G	Michigan State	
7	225	New England Patriots	Devin Lucien	WR	Arizona State	from Dallas via Seattle (Note: No. 225: Dallas → Seattle → New England. Multiple trades: Dallas → Seattle (PD). Dallas traded a seventh-round selection (225th overall) to Seattle in exchange for RB Christine Michael. Seattle → New England (D). See Round 5: New England → Seattle.)
7	226	Jacksonville Jaguars	Jonathan Woodard	DE	Central Arkansas	
7	227	Minnesota Vikings	Stephen Weatherly	LB	Vanderbilt	from Baltimore via Miami (Note: No. 227: Baltimore → Miami → Minnesota. Multiple trades: Baltimore → Miami (PD). Baltimore traded a seventh-round selection (227th overall) to Miami in exchange for CB Will Davis. Miami → Minnesota (D). See Round 6: Minnesota → Miami.)
7	228	Denver Broncos	Riley Dixon	P	Syracuse	from San Francisco (Note: No. 228: San Francisco → Denver (PD). See Round 6: Denver → San Francisco.)
7	229	Pittsburgh Steelers	Demarcus Ayers	WR	Houston	from NY Giants (Note: No. 229: NY Giants → Pittsburgh (PD). The NY Giants traded a conditional seventh-round selection in the 2016 draft to Pittsburgh in exchange for P Brad Wing.)
7	230	Chicago Bears	Daniel Braverman	WR	Western Michigan	
7	231	Miami Dolphins	Thomas Duarte	TE	UCLA	
7	232	Washington Redskins	Steven Daniels	LB	Boston College	from Tampa Bay (Note: No. 232: Tampa Bay → Washington (PD). See Round 6: Washington → Tampa Bay.)
7	233	Philadelphia Eagles	Jalen Mills	S	LSU	
7	234	Oakland Raiders	Vadal Alexander	G	LSU	
7	235	New York Jets	Lachlan Edwards	P	Sam Houston State	from Los Angeles via Houston and Denver (Note: No. 235: Los Angeles → Houston → Denver → NY Jets. Multiple trades: Los Angeles → Houston (PD). Los Angeles traded a seventh-round selection (235th overall) to Houston in exchange for QB Case Keenum. Houston → Denver (PD). Houston traded a seventh-round selection (235th overall) to Denver in exchange for OT Chris Clark. Denver → NY Jets (PD). See Round 5: NY Jets → Denver.)
7	236	Detroit Lions	Dwayne Washington	RB	Washington	
7	237	New Orleans Saints	Daniel Lasco	RB	California	
7	238	Atlanta Falcons	Devin Fuller	WR	UCLA	
7	239	Indianapolis Colts	Trevor Bates	LB	Maine	
7	240	Philadelphia Eagles	Alex McCalister	DE	Florida	from Buffalo via Minnesota (Note: No. 240: Buffalo → Minnesota → Philadelphia. Multiple trades: Buffalo → Minnesota (PD). Buffalo traded a seventh-round selection (240th overall) and a 2015 fifth-round selection to Minnesota in exchange for a 2015 sixth-round selection and QB Matt Cassel. Minnesota → Philadelphia (D). See Round 6: Philadelphia → Minnesota.)
7	241	New York Jets	Charone Peake	WR	Clemson	
7	242	Washington Redskins	Keith Marshall	RB	Georgia	
7	243	Seattle Seahawks	Kenny Lawler	WR	California	from Houston via New England (Note: No. 243: Houston → New England → Seattle. Multiple trades: Houston → New England (PD). Houston traded a conditional seventh–round selection (243rd overall) to New England in exchange for QB Ryan Mallett. The pick could have been upgraded to a sixth–round selection if Mallett played 40% of the Texans' snaps in 2014; the condition was not met. New England → Seattle (D). See Round 5: New England → Seattle.)
7	244	Minnesota Vikings	Jayron Kearse	S	Clemson	
7	245	Cincinnati Bengals	Clayton Fejedelem	S	Illinois	
7	246	Pittsburgh Steelers	Tyler Matakevich	LB	Temple	
7	247	Seattle Seahawks	Zac Brooks	RB	Clemson	
7	248	Indianapolis Colts	Austin Blythe	C	Iowa	from Green Bay (Note: No. 248: Green Bay → Indianapolis (D). See Round 2: Indianapolis → Green Bay.)
7	249	San Francisco 49ers	Prince Charles Iworah	CB	Western Kentucky	from Kansas City (Note: No. 249: Kansas City → San Francisco (D). See Round 1: Kansas City → San Francisco.)
7	250	Cleveland Browns	Scooby Wright	LB	Arizona	from New England via Miami (Note: No. 250: New England → Miami → Cleveland. Multiple trades: New England → Miami (D). See Round 5: Miami → New England. Miami → Cleveland (D). See Round 7: Cleveland → Miami.)
7	251	Philadelphia Eagles	Joe Walker	LB	Oregon	from Arizona (Note: No. 251: Arizona → Philadelphia (PD). Arizona traded a conditional seventh-round selection (251st overall) to Philadelphia in exchange for QB Matt Barkley; Arizona would not have had to give up the pick if Barkley was not on Philadelphia's roster for at least six games.)
7	252	Carolina Panthers	Beau Sandland	TE	Montana State	
7	253	Tennessee Titans	Kalan Reed	CB	Southern Miss	from Denver (Note: No. 253: Denver → Tennessee (D). See Round 5: Denver → Tennessee.); Mr. Irrelevant

== Notable undrafted players ==
Original NFL team	Player	Pos.	College	Notes
Arizona Cardinals	Kameron Canaday	LS	Portland State	
Arizona Cardinals	Matthias Farley	S	Notre Dame	
Atlanta Falcons	J. D. McKissic	WR	Arkansas State	
Atlanta Falcons	Sharrod Neasman	S	Florida Atlantic	
Atlanta Falcons	Joshua Perkins	TE	Washington	
Atlanta Falcons	Brian Poole	CB	Florida	
Atlanta Falcons	Nick Rose	K	Texas	
Baltimore Ravens	Trevon Coley	DE	Florida Atlantic	
Baltimore Ravens	Wil Lutz ^{†}	K	Georgia State	
Baltimore Ravens	Patrick Onwuasor	LB	Portland State	
Baltimore Ravens	Michael Pierce	DT	Samford	
Baltimore Ravens	Matt Skura	C	Duke	
Buffalo Bills	Reid Ferguson	LS	LSU	
Buffalo Bills	Justin Zimmer	DT	Ferris State	
Chicago Bears	Ben Braunecker	TE	Harvard	
Chicago Bears	Kevin Peterson	CB	Oklahoma State	
Chicago Bears	Roy Robertson-Harris	DE	UTEP	
Cincinnati Bengals	Alex Erickson	WR	Wisconsin	
Cleveland Browns	J. P. Holtz	TE	Pittsburgh	
Cleveland Browns	Tracy Howard	FS	Miami (FL)	
Dallas Cowboys	Jake Brendel	C	UCLA	
Dallas Cowboys	Andy Jones	WR	Jacksonville	
Dallas Cowboys	Zach Wood	DE	SMU	
Denver Broncos	Vontarrius Dora	LB	Louisiana Tech	
Denver Broncos	Kyle Peko	DT	Oregon State	
Denver Broncos	Kalif Raymond	WR	Holy Cross	
Detroit Lions	Adairius Barnes	CB	Louisiana Tech	
Green Bay Packers	Geronimo Allison	WR	Illinois	
Green Bay Packers	Kentrell Brice	S	Louisiana Tech	
Green Bay Packers	Joe Callahan	QB	Wesley	
Green Bay Packers	Marwin Evans	SS	Utah State	
Green Bay Packers	Reggie Gilbert	LB	Arizona	
Green Bay Packers	Josh Hawkins	CB	East Carolina	
Green Bay Packers	Lucas Patrick	G	Duke	
Green Bay Packers	Taybor Pepper	LS	Michigan State	
Green Bay Packers	Brian Price	DT	UTSA	
Houston Texans	Kaʻimi Fairbairn	K	UCLA	
Houston Texans	Joel Heath	DE	Michigan State	
Indianapolis Colts	Christopher Milton	CB	Georgia Tech	
Indianapolis Colts	Chester Rogers	WR	Grambling State	
Jacksonville Jaguars	Briean Boddy-Calhoun	CB	Minnesota	
Jacksonville Jaguars	Rashod Hill	T	Southern Miss	
Jacksonville Jaguars	Mike Hilton	CB	Ole Miss	
Jacksonville Jaguars	Jarrod Wilson	S	Michigan	
Los Angeles Rams	Morgan Fox	DE	CSU Pueblo	
Los Angeles Rams	Nicholas Grigsby	LB	Pittsburgh	
Los Angeles Rams	Mike Jordan	CB	Missouri Western	
Los Angeles Rams	Cory Littleton ^{†}	LB	Washington	
Los Angeles Rams	Paul McRoberts	WR	Southeast Missouri State	
Miami Dolphins	James Burgess	LB	Louisville	
Miami Dolphins	Lafayette Pitts	CB	Pittsburgh	
Miami Dolphins	Rashawn Scott	WR	Miami (FL)	
Minnesota Vikings	C. J. Ham ^{†}	RB	Augustana (SD)	
Minnesota Vikings	Brandon Zylstra	WR	Concordia–Moorhead	
New England Patriots	Jonathan Jones	CB	Auburn	
New England Patriots	Cre'Von LeBlanc	CB	Florida Atlantic	
New Orleans Saints	Ken Crawley	CB	Colorado	
New Orleans Saints	Tommylee Lewis	WR	Northern Illinois	
New York Giants	Andrew Adams	S	UConn	
New York Giants	Roger Lewis	WR	Bowling Green	
New York Giants	Romeo Okwara	DE	Notre Dame	
New York Jets	Robbie Chosen	WR	Temple	
New York Jets	Jalin Marshall	WR	Ohio State	
Oakland Raiders	Marvin Hall	WR	Washington	
Oakland Raiders	Tony McRae	CB	North Carolina A&T	
Oakland Raiders	Jaydon Mickens	WR	Washington	
Oakland Raiders	Jalen Richard	RB	Southern Miss	
San Diego Chargers	Chris Landrum	LB	Jacksonville State	
San Diego Chargers	Spencer Pulley	C	Vanderbilt	
San Diego Chargers	Trevor Williams	CB	Penn State	
Seattle Seahawks	Trevone Boykin	QB	TCU	
Seattle Seahawks	Brandin Bryant	DE	Florida Atlantic	
Seattle Seahawks	George Fant	T	Western Kentucky	
Seattle Seahawks	Steve Longa	LB	Rutgers	
Seattle Seahawks	Tanner McEvoy	WR	Wisconsin	
Seattle Seahawks	Troymaine Pope	RB	Jacksonville State	
Tampa Bay Buccaneers	Peyton Barber	RB	Auburn	
Tampa Bay Buccaneers	Alan Cross	TE	Memphis	
Tampa Bay Buccaneers	Javien Elliott	CB	Florida State	
Tampa Bay Buccaneers	Isaiah Johnson	S	South Carolina	
Tampa Bay Buccaneers	Luke Rhodes ^{†}	LS	William & Mary	
Tennessee Titans	Aldrick Rosas ^{†}	K	Southern Oregon	
Tennessee Titans	Antwaun Woods	DT	USC	
Washington Redskins	Maurice Harris	WR	California	
Washington Redskins	Robert Kelley	RB	Tulane	
Washington Redskins	Joe Kerridge	FB	Michigan	

== Trades ==
(PD) indicates trades completed prior to the start of the draft (i.e. Pre-Draft), while (D) denotes trades which took place during the 2016 draft.

Round 1

Round 2

Round 3

Round 4

Round 5

Round 6

Round 7

== Supplemental draft ==
The 2016 supplemental draft was held on July 14, 2016. For each player selected in the supplemental draft, the team forfeits its pick in that round in the draft of the following season. This year, six players were eligible for selection:

- Eddie D'Antuono – LS – Virginia Tech
- Ra'Zahn Howard – DL – Purdue
- Jalen Overstreet – RB – Sam Houston State
- Tee Shepard – CB – Ole Miss
- Rashaun Simonise – WR – Calgary
- Cameron Walton – DE – Concordia

No players were selected.

== Summary ==
=== Selections by college athletic conference ===
Conference	Round 1	Round 2	Round 3	Round 4	Round 5	Round 6	Round 7	Total
NCAA Division I FBS football conferences
The American	2	0	0	3	1	2	2	10
ACC	4	6	4	3	1	3	5	26
Big 12	3	4	2	5	6	6	0	26
Big Ten	6	7	10	9	2	10	3	47
C-USA	1	0	1	2	0	3	3	10
Ind. (FBS)	2	2	3	1	0	0	0	8
MAC	0	0	0	1	2	2	1	6
MW	0	1	4	1	1	2	0	9
Pac-12	4	2	4	2	7	4	9	32
SEC	8	8	6	9	7	8	5	51
Sun Belt	0	0	0	0	3	0	0	3
NCAA Division I FCS football conferences
Big Sky	0	0	0	1	1	1	1	4
CAA	0	0	0	0	0	1	1	2
Ivy	0	0	0	1	1	0	0	2
MEAC	0	0	1	1	0	1	0	3
MVFC	1	0	0	1	1	0	0	3
OVC	0	1	0	0	0	1	0	2
SoCon	0	1	0	0	0	0	0	1
Southland	0	0	0	0	0	1	2	3
Non-Division I football conferences
CWUAA (CIS)	0	0	0	1	0	0	0	1
GLIAC (DII)	0	0	0	0	1	0	0	1
Gulf South (DII)	0	0	0	0	1	0	0	1
Lone Star (DII)	0	0	0	0	1	0	0	1
Non-college selections
GFL	0	0	0	0	0	1	0	1

=== Schools with multiple draft selections ===
Selections	Schools
12	Ohio State
9	Clemson
8	UCLA
7	Alabama, Florida, Notre Dame
6	Baylor
5	Arkansas, Georgia, LSU, Michigan State, Ole Miss, Penn State, Stanford, TCU, West Virginia
4	Cal, Nebraska, Oklahoma, USC
3	Auburn, Boise State, Houston, Illinois, Indiana, Louisiana Tech, Maryland, Michigan, Mississippi State, Missouri, NC State, South Carolina, Temple, Texas A&M, Texas Tech Western Kentucky
2	Arizona, Arizona State, Boston College, Cincinnati, Colorado State, Florida State, Georgia Tech, Miami (FL), Minnesota, North Dakota State, Northwestern, Oregon, San Jose State, South Carolina State, Southern Miss, Southern Utah, Utah State, Virginia Tech, Washington, Western Michigan, Wisconsin

=== Selections by position ===
Position	Round 1	Round 2	Round 3	Round 4	Round 5	Round 6	Round 7	Total
Center	1	1	3	1	0	1	1	8
Cornerback	5	5	5	5	3	7	2	32
Defensive end	3	2	4	2	2	2	2	17
Defensive tackle	4	5	5	5	3	0	0	22
Fullback	0	0	0	0	0	3	0	3
Guard	1	1	1	2	3	3	2	13
Kicker	0	1	0	0	0	0	0	1
Linebacker	2	8	3	7	3	6	7	36
Long snapper	0	0	0	0	0	1	0	1
Offensive tackle	5	1	3	2	8	1	0	20
Punter	0	0	0	0	0	1	2	3
Quarterback	3	1	2	3	1	4	1	15
Running back	1	1	2	3	6	3	4	20
Safety	2	2	3	4	2	4	3	20
Tight end	0	1	2	1	0	3	2	9
Wide receiver	4	3	2	6	5	7	6	33

Position	Round 1	Round 2	Round 3	Round 4	Round 5	Round 6	Round 7	Total
Offense	15	9	15	18	23	25	16	121
Defense	16	22	20	23	13	19	14	127
Special teams	0	1	0	0	0	2	2	5
