= 2015 Tennessee Tech Golden Eagles football team =

American college football season

2015 Tennessee Tech Golden Eagles football
- Conference: Ohio Valley Conference
- Record: 4–7 (3–5 OVC)
- Head coach: Watson Brown (9th season)
- Offensive coordinator: Steven Brown (4th season)
- Offensive scheme: Multiple spread
- Defensive coordinator: Donn Landholm (3rd season)
- Base defense: Multiple 4–2–5
- Home stadium: Tucker Stadium

2015 Ohio Valley Conference football standings
	Conf.			Overall
Team	W		L	W		L
No. 2 Jacksonville State $^	8	–	0	13	–	2
No. 25 Eastern Illinois ^	7	–	1	7	–	5
UT Martin	6	–	2	7	–	4
Eastern Kentucky	5	–	3	6	–	5
SE Missouri State	3	–	4	4	–	7
Tennessee Tech	3	–	5	4	–	7
Murray State	2	–	6	3	–	8
Tennessee State	1	–	6	4	–	6
Austin Peay	0	–	8	0	–	11
$ – Conference champion; ^ – FCS playoff participant; Rankings from STATS Poll

The 2015 Tennessee Tech Golden Eagles football team represented Tennessee Technological University as a member of Ohio Valley Conference (OVC) during the 2015 NCAA Division I FCS football season. Led by Watson Brown in his ninth and final season as head coach, the Golden Eagles compiled an overall record of 4–7 overall with a mark of 3–5 in conference play, placing sixth in the OVC. Tennessee Tech played home games at Tucker Stadium in Cookeville, Tennessee.

The game against Eastern Kentucky originally scheduled for October 10 was played two days earlier at Toyota Stadium in Georgetown, Kentucky due to campus safety concerns in the wake of threatening graffiti in a campus restroom and other threats allegedly made over social media.

On December 2, head coach Brown announced his retirement. His tenure at Tennessee Tech finished with a nine-year record of 42–60.

== Schedule ==
Date	Time	Opponent	Site	TV	Result	Attendance
September 5	7:00 pm	at Houston*	TDECU Stadium; Houston, TX	ESPN3	L 24–52	30,479
September 12	6:00 pm	at Wofford*	Gibbs Stadium; Spartanburg, SC	SDN	L 14–34	6,834
September 19	6:00 pm	Mercer*	Tucker Stadium; Cookeville, TN	WCTE	W 29–22	9,028
September 26	6:00 pm	at Murray State	Roy Stewart Stadium; Murray, KY	ASN	W 31–29	10,620
October 3	6:00 pm	UT Martin	Tucker Stadium; Cookeville, TN (Sgt. York Trophy)	ESPN3	L 17–31	3,152
October 8	6:00 pm	vs. No. 17 Eastern Kentucky	Toyota Stadium; Georgetown, KY	OVCDN	L 17–48	3,700
October 17	6:00 pm	No. 1 Jacksonville State	Tucker Stadium; Cookeville, TN	WCTE	L 13–42	5,575
October 24	1:00 pm	at Eastern Illinois	O'Brien Field; Charleston, IL	OVCDN	L 20–51	6,713
October 31	1:00 pm	at Southeast Missouri State	Houck Stadium; Cape Girardeau, MO	OVCDN	L 17–38	2,985
November 14	1:30 pm	Austin Peay	Tucker Stadium; Cookeville, TN (Sgt. York Trophy)	OVCDN	W 42–24	11,100
November 21	2:30 pm	Tennessee State	Tucker Stadium; Cookeville, TN (Sgt. York Trophy)	ASN	W 30–24	3,924
*Non-conference game; Rankings from STATS Poll released prior to the game; All times are in Central time
