= 2015 Murray State Racers football team =

American college football season

2015 Murray State Racers football
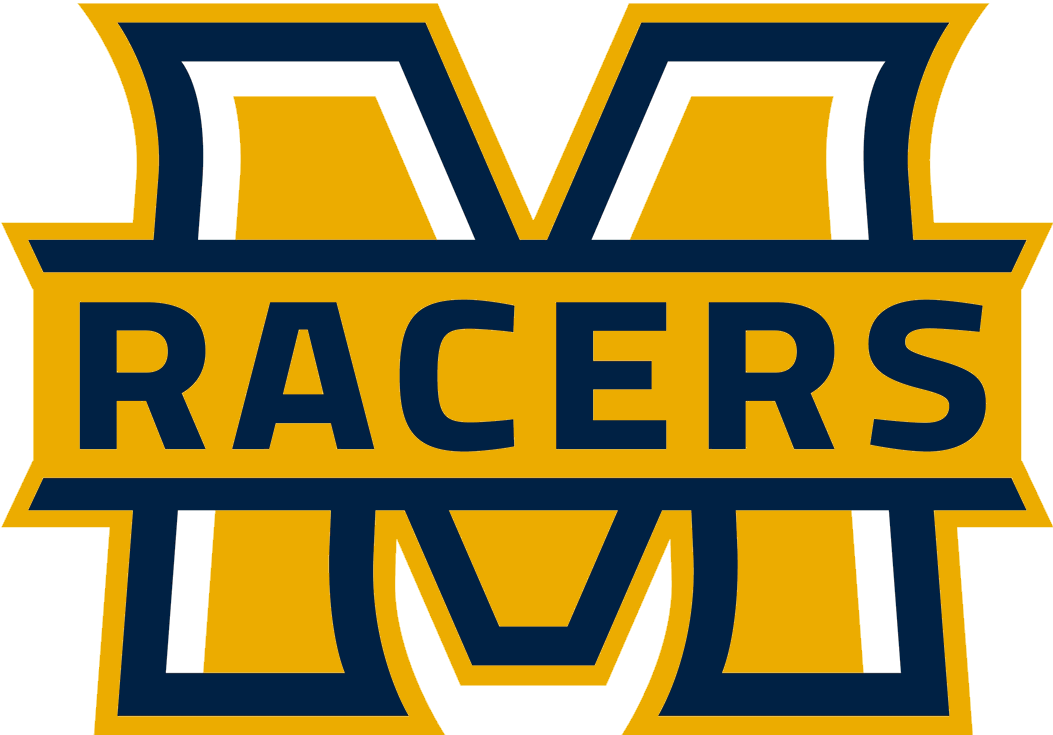
- Conference: Ohio Valley Conference
- Record: 3–8 (2–6 OVC)
- Head coach: Mitch Stewart (1st season)
- Defensive coordinator: Chris Boone
- Home stadium: Roy Stewart Stadium

2015 Ohio Valley Conference football standings
	Conf.			Overall
Team	W		L	W		L
No. 2 Jacksonville State $^	8	–	0	13	–	2
No. 25 Eastern Illinois ^	7	–	1	7	–	5
UT Martin	6	–	2	7	–	4
Eastern Kentucky	5	–	3	6	–	5
SE Missouri State	3	–	4	4	–	7
Tennessee Tech	3	–	5	4	–	7
Murray State	2	–	6	3	–	8
Tennessee State	1	–	6	4	–	6
Austin Peay	0	–	8	0	–	11
$ – Conference champion; ^ – FCS playoff participant; Rankings from STATS Poll

The 2015 Murray State Racers football team represented Murray State University in the 2015 NCAA Division I FCS football season. They were led by first-year head coach Mitch Stewart and played their home games at Roy Stewart Stadium. They were a member of the Ohio Valley Conference. They finished the season 3–8, 2–6 in OVC play to finish in seventh place.

== Schedule ==
Date	Time	Opponent	Site	TV	Result	Attendance
September 3	6:00 pm	Kentucky Wesleyan*	Roy Stewart Stadium; Murray, KY	OVCDN	W 52–12	6,037
September 12	2:30 pm	at Northern Illinois*	Huskie Stadium; DeKalb, IL	ESPN3	L 26–57	17,465
September 19	6:00 pm	at Western Michigan*	Waldo Stadium; Kalamazoo, MI	ESPN3	L 20–52	20,543
September 26	6:00 pm	Tennessee Tech	Roy Stewart Stadium; Murray, KY	ASN	L 29–31	10,620
October 3	6:00 pm	at Southeast Missouri State	Houck Stadium; Cape Girardeau, MO	ASN	L 10–27	4,376
October 10	3:00 pm	Austin Peay^{†}	Roy Stewart Stadium; Murray, KY	OVCDN	W 34–18	9,019
October 24	2:00 pm	at Tennessee–Martin	Graham Stadium; Martin, TN	OVCDN	L 45–52	2,458
October 31	1:00 pm	Eastern Illinois	Roy Stewart Stadium; Murray, KY	OVCDN	L 20–34	2,108
November 7	2:30 pm	at Tennessee State	Hale Stadium; Nashville, TN	ASN	W 46–43 ^{OT}	7,897
November 14	1:00 pm	No. 24 Eastern Kentucky	Roy Stewart Stadium; Murray, KY	OVCDN	L 34–41 ^{2OT}	2,457
November 21	1:00 pm	at No. 1 Jacksonville State	JSU Stadium; Jacksonville, AL	OVCDN	L 20–42	18,555
*Non-conference game; ^{†}Homecoming; Rankings from STATS Poll released prior to the game; All times are in Central time

- Source: Schedule
