= 2015 Austin Peay Governors football team =

American college football season

2015 Austin Peay Governors football
- Conference: Ohio Valley Conference
- Record: 0–11 (0–8 OVC)
- Head coach: Kirby Cannon (3rd season)
- Offensive coordinator: Josh Richards
- Home stadium: Governors Stadium

2015 Ohio Valley Conference football standings
	Conf.			Overall
Team	W		L	W		L
No. 2 Jacksonville State $^	8	–	0	13	–	2
No. 25 Eastern Illinois ^	7	–	1	7	–	5
UT Martin	6	–	2	7	–	4
Eastern Kentucky	5	–	3	6	–	5
SE Missouri State	3	–	4	4	–	7
Tennessee Tech	3	–	5	4	–	7
Murray State	2	–	6	3	–	8
Tennessee State	1	–	6	4	–	6
Austin Peay	0	–	8	0	–	11
$ – Conference champion; ^ – FCS playoff participant; Rankings from STATS Poll

The 2015 Austin Peay Governors football team represented Austin Peay State University during the 2015 NCAA Division I FCS football season. The Governors were led by third-year head coach Kirby Cannon, played their home games at Governors Stadium, and were a member of the Ohio Valley Conference. They finished the season 0–11, 0–8 in OVC play to finish in last place. This was the second time in the last three seasons that the Governors went winless and they are 1–34 in that span.

On November 23, with a three year record of 1–34, head coach Kirby Cannon was fired.

== Schedule ==
Date	Time	Opponent	Site	TV	Result	Attendance
September 5	4:00 pm	Mercer*	Governors Stadium; Clarksville, TN	APSU-TV	L 7–28	5,814
September 12	2:30 pm	at Southern Miss*	M. M. Roberts Stadium; Hattiesburg, MS	ASN	L 6–52	23,042
September 19	3:00 pm	at Vanderbilt*	Vanderbilt Stadium; Nashville, TN	SECN	L 7–47	31,399
September 26	6:00 pm	at No. 18 Eastern Kentucky	Roy Kidd Stadium; Richmond, KY	OVCDN	L 13–51	11,400
October 3	4:00 pm	Eastern Illinois	Governors Stadium; Clarksville, TN	APSU-TV	L 16–40	2,531
October 10	3:00 pm	at Murray State	Roy Stewart Stadium; Murray, KY	OVCDN	L 18–34	9,019
October 17	4:00 pm	Tennessee–Martin	Governors Stadium; Clarksville, TN (Sgt. York Trophy)	APSU-TV	L 14–44	3,183
October 24	4:00 pm	No. 1 Jacksonville State^{†}	Governors Stadium; Clarksville, TN	APSU-TV	L 7–27	5,411
October 31	2:00 pm	at Tennessee State	Nissan Stadium; Nashville, TN (Sgt. York Trophy)	OVCDN	L 6–20	5,985
November 7	4:00 pm	Southeast Missouri State	Governors Stadium; Clarksville, TN	APSU-TV	L 15–44	6,447
November 14	1:30 pm	at Tennessee Tech	Tucker Stadium; Cookeville, TN (Sgt. York Trophy)	OVCDN	L 24–42	11,100
*Non-conference game; ^{†}Homecoming; Rankings from STATS Poll released prior to the game; All times are in Central time

GovTV airs across the state on Charter Channel 99, CDE Lightband Channel 9, and U-Verse 99. It is also the broadcast OVC Digital Network uses for its free stream.
