= Mitch Stewart (American football) =

American football player and coach (born 1982)

Current position
- Title: Quarterbacks coach
- Team: Arkansas
- Conference: SEC

Biographical details
- Born: November 8, 1982 (age 43)

Playing career
- 2001–2005: Valdosta State
- Position: Quarterback

Coaching career (HC unless noted)
- 2006: Newnan HS (GA) (OC)
- 2007–2009: Georgia Southern (WR)
- 2010–2011: Murray State (WR)
- 2012–2014: Murray State (OC)
- 2015–2019: Murray State
- 2020: Samford (WR)
- 2021: Samford (OC/WR)
- 2022–2023: Middle Tennessee (OC)
- 2024: Memphis (senior OA)
- 2025: Memphis (QB)
- 2026–present: Arkansas (QB)

Head coaching record
- Overall: 19–37

Mitch Stewart (born November 8, 1982) is an American college football coach and former player. He is the quarterbacks coach for the University of Arkansas, a position he has held since 2026. He was previously the wide receivers coach at South Alabama for a month before leaving for Arkansas. He was the offensive coordinator at Middle Tennessee from 2022 to 2023. He was the offensive coordinator and wide receivers coach at Samford. He was the head football coach at Murray State University in Murray, Kentucky, a position he held from 2015 until 2019. Stewart played college football as a quarterback at Valdosta State University in Valdosta, Georgia

== Head coaching record ==
Year	Team	Overall	Conference	Standing	Bowl/playoffs
Murray State Racers (Ohio Valley Conference) (2015–2019)
2015	Murray State	3–8	2–6	7th	
2016	Murray State	4–7	4–4	T–5th	
2017	Murray State	3–8	2–5	T–7th	
2018	Murray State	5–6	5–3	4th	
2019	Murray State	4–8	2–6	T–7th	
Murray State:		19–37	15–24		
Total:		19–37			
