= 2015 Tennessee State Tigers football team =

American college football season

2015 Tennessee State Tigers football
- Conference: Ohio Valley Conference
- Record: 4–6 (1–6 OVC)
- Head coach: Rod Reed (6th season)
- Offensive coordinator: Jeff Parker (1st season)
- Defensive coordinator: Osita Alaribe (5th season)
- Home stadium: Nissan Stadium; Hale Stadium

2015 Ohio Valley Conference football standings
	Conf.			Overall
Team	W		L	W		L
No. 2 Jacksonville State $^	8	–	0	13	–	2
No. 25 Eastern Illinois ^	7	–	1	7	–	5
UT Martin	6	–	2	7	–	4
Eastern Kentucky	5	–	3	6	–	5
SE Missouri State	3	–	4	4	–	7
Tennessee Tech	3	–	5	4	–	7
Murray State	2	–	6	3	–	8
Tennessee State	1	–	6	4	–	6
Austin Peay	0	–	8	0	–	11
$ – Conference champion; ^ – FCS playoff participant; Rankings from STATS Poll

The 2015 Tennessee State Tigers football team represented Tennessee State University as a member of the Ohio Valley Conference (OVC) in the 2015 NCAA Division I FCS football season. Led by sixth-year head coach Rod Reed, the Tigers compiled an overall record of 4–6 with a mark of 1–6 in conference play, placing eighth in the OVC. Tennessee State played home games in Nashville, Tennessee at Nissan Stadium and Hale Stadium.

The Tigers were initially ineligible to participate in postseason play for the 2015 season to due Academic Progress Rate (APR). violations, but athletic director Teresa Phillips issue an appeal was issued. The Tigers had the postseason ban lifted in early June due to miscalculation by the National Collegiate Athletic Association (NCAA) of the football program's APR based on outdated information.

== Schedule ==
Date	Time	Opponent	Site	TV	Result	Attendance
September 6	6:00 pm	Alabama State*	Nissan Stadium; Nashville, TN (John Merritt Classic)	OVCDN	W 24–14	20,055
September 12	6:00 pm	vs. Jackson State*	Liberty Bowl Memorial Stadium; Memphis, TN (Southern Heritage Classic)	SportSouth	W 35–25	48,385
September 19	1:00 pm	at No. 1 Jacksonville State	JSU Stadium; Jacksonville, AL	ESPN3	L 13–48	23,413
September 26	3:00 pm	at Florida A&M*	Bragg Memorial Stadium; Tallahassee, FL		W 30–14	18,020
October 10	2:30 pm	at UT Martin	Graham Stadium; Martin, TN (Sgt. York Trophy)	ASN	L 14–28	7,123
October 17	6:00 pm	Eastern Illinois^{†}	Nissan Stadium; Nashville, TN	ASN	L 22–25 ^{OT}	22,144
October 24	2:00 pm	at No. 13 Eastern Kentucky	Roy Kidd Stadium; Richmond, KY	OVCDN	L 21–45	9,400
October 31	2:00 pm	Austin Peay	Hale Stadium; Nashville, TN	OVCDN	W 20–6	5,985
November 7	2:30 pm	Murray State	Hale Stadium; Nashville, TN	ASN	L 43–46 ^{OT}	7,897
November 21	2:30 pm	at Tennessee Tech	Tucker Stadium; Cookeville, TN	ASN	L 24–30	3,924
*Non-conference game; ^{†}Homecoming; Rankings from STATS Poll released prior to the game; All times are in Central time
