= 2015 UT Martin Skyhawks football team =

American college football season

2015 UT Martin Skyhawks football
- Conference: Ohio Valley Conference
- Record: 7–4 (6–2 OVC)
- Head coach: Jason Simpson (10th season)
- Offensive coordinator: John Bond (2nd season)
- Defensive coordinator: Jeff Byrd (4th season)
- Home stadium: Graham Stadium

2015 Ohio Valley Conference football standings
	Conf.			Overall
Team	W		L	W		L
No. 2 Jacksonville State $^	8	–	0	13	–	2
No. 25 Eastern Illinois ^	7	–	1	7	–	5
UT Martin	6	–	2	7	–	4
Eastern Kentucky	5	–	3	6	–	5
SE Missouri State	3	–	4	4	–	7
Tennessee Tech	3	–	5	4	–	7
Murray State	2	–	6	3	–	8
Tennessee State	1	–	6	4	–	6
Austin Peay	0	–	8	0	–	11
$ – Conference champion; ^ – FCS playoff participant; Rankings from STATS Poll

The 2015 UT Martin Skyhawks football team represented the University of Tennessee at Martin as a member of the Ohio Valley Conference (OVC) during the 2015 NCAA Division I FCS football season. Led by tenth-year head coach Jason Simpson, the Skyhawks compiled an overall record of 7–4 with a mark of 6–2 in conference play, placing third in the OVC. UT Martin played home games at Graham Stadium in Martin, Tennessee.

== Schedule ==
Date	Time	Opponent	Site	TV	Result	Attendance
September 5	12:00 pm	at No. 17 (FBS) Ole Miss*	Vaught–Hemingway Stadium; Oxford, MS	SEC Alt.	L 3–76	60,186
September 10	6:30 pm	Bethel (TN)*	Graham Stadium; Martin, TN	OVCDN	W 72–10	6,418
September 26	2:00 pm	No. 1 Jacksonville State	Graham Stadium; Martin, TN	ESPN3	L 41–48	3,982
October 3	6:00 pm	at Tennessee Tech	Tucker Stadium; Cookeville, TN (Sgt. York Trophy)	ESPN3	W 31–17	3,152
October 10	2:30 pm	Tennessee State^{†}	Graham Stadium; Martin, TN (Sgt. York Trophy)	ASN	W 28–14	7,123
October 17	4:00 pm	at Austin Peay	Governors Stadium; Clarksville, TN (Sgt. York Trophy)	OVCDN	W 44–14	3,183
October 24	2:00 pm	Murray State	Graham Stadium; Martin, TN	OVCDN	W 52–45	2,458
October 31	4:00 pm	at Arkansas*	Donald W. Reynolds Razorback Stadium; Fayetteville, AR	SEC Alt.	L 28–63	64,206
November 7	12:00 pm	at No. 18 Eastern Kentucky	Roy Kidd Stadium; Richmond, KY	OVCDN	W 42–35	7,800
November 14	2:00 pm	Eastern Illinois	Graham Stadium; Martin, TN	OVCDN	L 21–23	3,761
November 21	1:00 pm	at Southeast Missouri State	Houck Stadium; Cape Girardeau, MO	OVCDN	W 28–25	1,732
*Non-conference game; ^{†}Homecoming; Rankings from STATS Poll released prior to the game; All times are in Central time
