= 2015 Eastern Kentucky Colonels football team =

American college football season

2015 Eastern Kentucky Colonels football
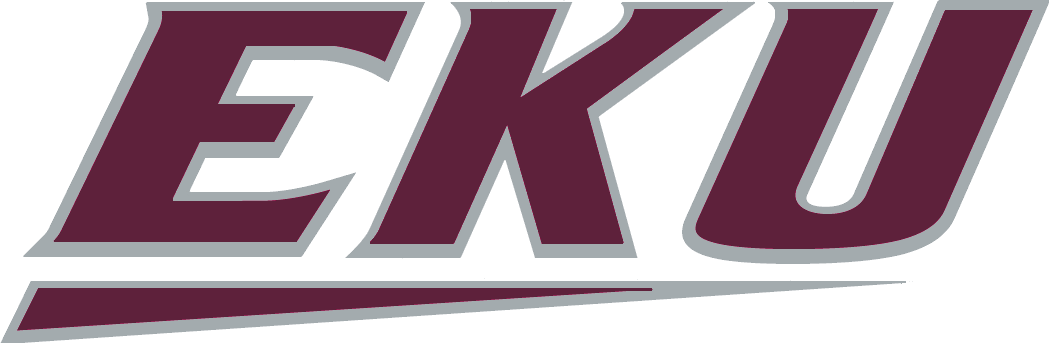
- Conference: Ohio Valley Conference
- Record: 6–5 (5–3 OVC)
- Head coach: Dean Hood (8th season)
- Offensive coordinator: Dane Damron (5th season)
- Home stadium: Roy Kidd Stadium

2015 Ohio Valley Conference football standings
	Conf.			Overall
Team	W		L	W		L
No. 2 Jacksonville State $^	8	–	0	13	–	2
No. 25 Eastern Illinois ^	7	–	1	7	–	5
UT Martin	6	–	2	7	–	4
Eastern Kentucky	5	–	3	6	–	5
SE Missouri State	3	–	4	4	–	7
Tennessee Tech	3	–	5	4	–	7
Murray State	2	–	6	3	–	8
Tennessee State	1	–	6	4	–	6
Austin Peay	0	–	8	0	–	11
$ – Conference champion; ^ – FCS playoff participant; Rankings from STATS Poll

The 2015 Eastern Kentucky Colonels football team represented Eastern Kentucky University during the 2015 NCAA Division I FCS football season. They were led by eighth-year head coach Dean Hood and played their home games at Roy Kidd Stadium. The Colonels were a member of the Ohio Valley Conference. They finished season 6–5, and 5–3 in OVC play and finished in fourth place.

Their game against Tennessee Tech originally scheduled for October 10 was played two days earlier at Toyota Stadium in Georgetown, Kentucky due to campus safety concerns in the wake of threatening graffiti in a campus restroom and other threats allegedly made over social media.

On November 23, Hood was fired. He finished at Eastern Kentucky with an eight-year record of 55–38.

== Schedule ==
Date	Time	Opponent	Rank	Site	TV	Result	Attendance
September 3	7:00 pm	Valparaiso*	No. 17	Roy Kidd Stadium; Richmond, KY	OVCDN	W 52–10	12,800
September 12	6:00 pm	at NC State*	No. 19	Carter–Finley Stadium; Raleigh, NC	ESPN3	L 0–35	57,600
September 26	6:00 pm	Austin Peay	No. 18	Roy Kidd Stadium; Richmond, KY	OVCDN	W 51–13	11,400
October 3	7:30 pm	at Kentucky*	No. 17	Commonwealth Stadium; Lexington, KY	SECN Alt.	L 27–34 ^{OT}	63,380
October 8	7:00 pm	vs. Tennessee Tech	No. 17	Toyota Stadium; Georgetown, KY	OVCDN	W 48–17	3,700
October 17	2:00 pm	at Southeast Missouri State	No. 14	Houck Stadium; Cape Girardeau, MO	OVCDN	W 27–10	7,589
October 24	3:00 pm	Tennessee State^{†}	No. 13	Roy Kidd Stadium; Richmond, KY	OVCDN	W 45–21	9,400
October 31	2:00 pm	at No. 1 Jacksonville State	No. 13	JSU Stadium; Jacksonville, AL	OVCDN	L 0–34	21,988
November 7	1:00 pm	Tennessee–Martin	No. 18	Roy Kidd Stadium; Richmond, KY	OVCDN	L 35–42	7,800
November 14	2:00 pm	at Murray State	No. 24	Roy Stewart Stadium; Murray, KY	OVCDN	W 41–34 ^{2OT}	2,457
November 21	2:00 pm	at Eastern Illinois	No. 23	O'Brien Stadium; Charleston, IL	OVCDN	L 7–21	1,438
*Non-conference game; ^{†}Homecoming; Rankings from STATS Poll released prior to the game; All times are in Eastern time

- Source: Schedule

== Ranking movements ==
Ranking movements Legend: ██ Increase in ranking ██ Decrease in ranking — = Not ranked RV = Received votes
	Week													
Poll	Pre	1	2	3	4	5	6	7	8	9	10	11	12	Final
STATS FCS	17	19	21	18	17	17	14	13	13	18	24	23	RV	—
Coaches	17	19	22	21	21	20	15	14	14	19	RV	RV	RV	—
