= 2015 Southeast Missouri State Redhawks football team =

American college football season

2015 Southeast Missouri State Redhawks football
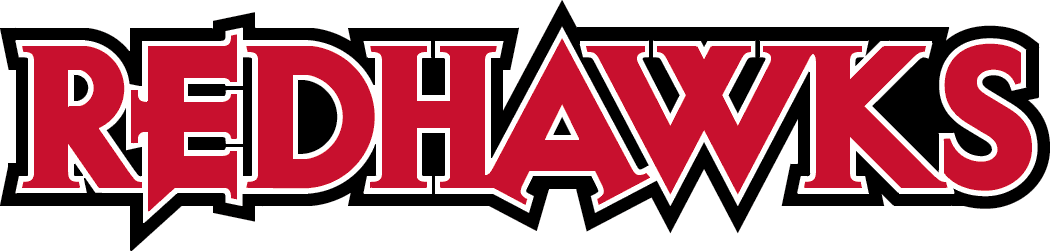
- Conference: Ohio Valley Conference
- Record: 4–7 (3–4 OVC)
- Head coach: Tom Matukewicz (2nd season)
- Offensive coordinator: Sherard Poteete (2nd season)
- Defensive coordinator: Bryce Saia (2nd season)
- Home stadium: Houck Stadium

2015 Ohio Valley Conference football standings
	Conf.			Overall
Team	W		L	W		L
No. 2 Jacksonville State $^	8	–	0	13	–	2
No. 25 Eastern Illinois ^	7	–	1	7	–	5
UT Martin	6	–	2	7	–	4
Eastern Kentucky	5	–	3	6	–	5
SE Missouri State	3	–	4	4	–	7
Tennessee Tech	3	–	5	4	–	7
Murray State	2	–	6	3	–	8
Tennessee State	1	–	6	4	–	6
Austin Peay	0	–	8	0	–	11
$ – Conference champion; ^ – FCS playoff participant; Rankings from STATS Poll

The 2015 Southeast Missouri State Redhawks football team represented Southeast Missouri State University as a member of the Ohio Valley Conference (OVC) during the 2015 NCAA Division I FCS football season. Led by second-year head coach Tom Matukewicz, the Redhawks compiled an overall record of 4–7 with a mark of 3–4 in conference play, placing fifth in the OVC. Southeast Missouri State played home games at Houck Stadium in Cape Girardeau, Missouri.

== Schedule ==
Date	Time	Opponent	Site	TV	Result	Attendance
September 5	3:00 pm	at No. 24 (FBS) Missouri*	Faurot Field; Columbia, MO	SEC Alt.	L 3–34	64,670
September 12	6:00 pm	Southern Illinois*	Houck Stadium; Cape Girardeau, MO	OVCDN	W 27–24	8,015
September 19	2:05 pm	at No. 23 Indiana State*	Memorial Stadium; Terre Haute, IN	ESPN3	L 28–29	6,786
September 26	1:00 pm	Shorter*	Houck Stadium; Cape Girardeau, MO	OVCDN	L 21–26	4,125
October 3	6:00 pm	Murray State	Houck Stadium; Cape Girardeau, MO	ASN	W 27–10	4,376
October 10	1:00 pm	at Eastern Illinois	O'Brien Field; Charleston, IL	ESPN3	L 28–33	7,911
October 17	1:00 pm	No. 14 Eastern Kentucky^{†}	Houck Stadium; Cape Girardeau, MO	OVCDN	L 10–27	7,589
October 31	1:00 pm	Tennessee Tech	Houck Stadium; Cape Girardeau, MO	OVCDN	W 38–17	2,985
November 7	4:00 pm	at Austin Peay	Governors Stadium; Clarksville, TN	OVCDN	W 44–15	6,447
November 14	1:00 pm	at No. 1 Jacksonville State	Burgess–Snow Field at JSU Stadium; Jacksonville, AL	OVCDN	L 28–56	18,995
November 21	1:00 pm	UT Martin	Houck Stadium; Cape Girardeau, MO	OVCDN	L 25–28	1,732
*Non-conference game; ^{†}Homecoming; Rankings from STATS Poll released prior to the game; All times are in Central time
