= 2015 Eastern Illinois Panthers football team =

American college football season

2015 Eastern Illinois Panthers football

NCAA Division I First Round, L 17–53 vs. Northern Iowa
- Conference: Ohio Valley Conference

Ranking
- STATS: No. 25
- FCS Coaches: No. 24
- Record: 7–5 (7–1 OVC)
- Head coach: Kim Dameron (2nd season)
- Offensive coordinator: Greg Stevens (2nd season)
- Defensive coordinator: Kane Wommack (2nd season)
- Home stadium: O'Brien Field

2015 Ohio Valley Conference football standings
	Conf.			Overall
Team	W		L	W		L
No. 2 Jacksonville State $^	8	–	0	13	–	2
No. 25 Eastern Illinois ^	7	–	1	7	–	5
UT Martin	6	–	2	7	–	4
Eastern Kentucky	5	–	3	6	–	5
SE Missouri State	3	–	4	4	–	7
Tennessee Tech	3	–	5	4	–	7
Murray State	2	–	6	3	–	8
Tennessee State	1	–	6	4	–	6
Austin Peay	0	–	8	0	–	11
$ – Conference champion; ^ – FCS playoff participant; Rankings from STATS Poll

The 2015 Eastern Illinois Panthers football team represented Eastern Illinois University as a member of the Ohio Valley Conference (OVC) during the 2015 NCAA Division I FCS football season. Led by second-year head coach Kim Dameron, the Eastern Illinois compiled an overall record of 7–5 overall with a mark of 7–1 in conference play, placing second in the OVC. The Panthers received an at-large bid to the NCAA Division I Football Championship playoffs, where they lost in the first round to Northern Iowa. The team played home games at O'Brien Field in Charleston, Illinois.

== Schedule ==
Date	Time	Opponent	Rank	Site	TV	Result	Attendance
September 3	7:00 pm	at Western Illinois*		Hanson Field; Macomb, IL	ESPN3	L 5–33	5,985
September 12	3:00 pm	at Northwestern*		Ryan Field; Evanston, IL	ESPNews	L 0–41	29,131
September 19	6:00 pm	No. 5 Illinois State*		O'Brien Field; Charleston, IL (Mid-America Classic)	WCIA	L 31–34 ^{OT}	8,104
October 3	4:00 pm	at Austin Peay		Governors Stadium; Clarksville, TN	OVCDN	W 40–16	2,531
October 10	1:00 pm	Southeast Missouri State		O'Brien Field; Charleston, IL	ESPN3	W 33–28	7,911
October 17	6:00 pm	at Tennessee State		Nissan Stadium; Nashville, TN	ASN	W 25–22 ^{OT}	22,144
October 24	1:00 pm	Tennessee Tech^{†}		O'Brien Field; Charleston, IL	WEIU	W 51–20	6,713
October 31	1:00 pm	at Murray State		Roy Stewart Stadium; Murray, KY	OVCDN	W 34–20	2,108
November 7	1:00 pm	No. 1 Jacksonville State		O'Brien Field; Charleston, IL	WEIU	L 3–24	4,221
November 14	2:00 pm	at UT Martin		Graham Stadium; Martin, TN	OVCDN	W 23–21	3,761
November 21	1:00 pm	No. 23 Eastern Kentucky		O'Brien Field; Charleston, IL	WEIU	W 21–7	1,438
November 28	5:00 pm	at No. 15 Northern Iowa	No. 24	UNI-Dome; Cedar Falls, IA (NCAA Division I First Round)	ESPN3	L 17–53	7,062
*Non-conference game; ^{†}Homecoming; Rankings from STATS Poll released prior to the game; All times are in Central time

== Ranking movements ==
Ranking movements Legend: ██ Increase in ranking ██ Decrease in ranking — = Not ranked RV = Received votes
	Week													
Poll	Pre	1	2	3	4	5	6	7	8	9	10	11	12	Final
STATS FCS	RV	RV	—	—	—	—	—	RV	RV	RV	RV	RV	24	25
Coaches	25	—	—	—	—	—	—	RV	RV	RV	RV	RV	25	24
