= 2015 Jacksonville State Gamecocks football team =

American college football season

2015 Jacksonville State Gamecocks football

OVC champion

NCAA Division I Championship Game, L 10–37 vs. North Dakota State
- Conference: Ohio Valley Conference

Ranking
- STATS: No. 2
- FCS Coaches: No. 2
- Record: 13–2 (8–0 OVC)
- Head coach: John Grass (2nd season)
- Co-defensive coordinators: David Blackwell (2nd season); Brandon Hall (2nd season)
- Home stadium: Burgess–Snow Field at JSU Stadium

2015 Ohio Valley Conference football standings
	Conf.			Overall
Team	W		L	W		L
No. 2 Jacksonville State $^	8	–	0	13	–	2
No. 25 Eastern Illinois ^	7	–	1	7	–	5
UT Martin	6	–	2	7	–	4
Eastern Kentucky	5	–	3	6	–	5
SE Missouri State	3	–	4	4	–	7
Tennessee Tech	3	–	5	4	–	7
Murray State	2	–	6	3	–	8
Tennessee State	1	–	6	4	–	6
Austin Peay	0	–	8	0	–	11
$ – Conference champion; ^ – FCS playoff participant; Rankings from STATS Poll

The 2015 Jacksonville State Gamecocks football team represented Jacksonville State University as a member of the Ohio Valley Conference (OVC) during the 2015 NCAA Division I FCS football season. Led by second-year head coach John Grass, the Gamecocks compiled an overall record of 13–2 with a mark of 8–0 in conference play, winning the OVC title for the second consecutive season. Jacksonville State received the OVC's automatic bid to the NCAA Division I Football Championship playoffs. After a first-round bye, the Gamecocks defeated Chattanooga in the second round, Charleston Southern in the quarterfinals, and Sam Houston State in the semifinals before losing to North Dakota State in the NCAA Division I Championship Game. The team played home games at Burgess–Snow Field at JSU Stadium in Jacksonville, Alabama.

== Schedule ==
Date	Time	Opponent	Rank	Site	TV	Result	Attendance
September 5	5:00 pm	at No. 8 Chattanooga*	No. 7	Finley Stadium; Chattanooga, TN	SDN	W 23–20	15,812
September 12	11:00 am	at No. 6 (FBS) Auburn*	No. 5	Jordan–Hare Stadium; Auburn, AL	SECN	L 20–27 ^{OT}	87,451
September 19	1:00 pm	Tennessee State	No. 1	Burgess–Snow Field at JSU Stadium; Jacksonville, AL	ESPN3	W 48–13	23,413
September 26	2:00 pm	at UT Martin	No. 1	Graham Stadium; Martin, TN	ESPN3	W 48–41	3,982
October 3	1:00 pm	Mississippi Valley State*	No. 1	JSU Stadium; Jacksonville, AL	WJXS	W 49–7	13,889
October 17	6:00 pm	at Tennessee Tech	No. 1	Tucker Stadium; Cookeville, TN	OVCDN	W 42–13	5,575
October 24	4:00 pm	at Austin Peay	No. 1	Governors Stadium; Clarksville, TN	OVCDN	W 27–7	5,411
October 31	1:00 pm	No. 13 Eastern Kentucky^{†}	No. 1	Burgess–Snow Field at JSU Stadium; Jacksonville, AL	WJXS	W 34–0	21,988
November 7	1:00 pm	at Eastern Illinois	No. 1	O'Brien Field; Charleston, IL	OVCDN	W 24–3	4,221
November 14	1:00 pm	Southeast Missouri State	No. 1	Burgess–Snow Field at JSU Stadium; Jacksonville, AL	WJXS	W 56–28	18,995
November 21	1:00 pm	Murray State	No. 1	Burgess–Snow Field at JSU Stadium; Jacksonville, AL	WJXS	W 42–20	18,555
December 5	2:00 pm	No. 7 Chattanooga*	No. 1	Burgess–Snow Field at JSU Stadium; Jacksonville, AL (NCAA Division I Second Round)	ESPN3	W 41–35 ^{OT}	21,452
December 11	7:00 pm	No. 9 Charleston Southern*	No. 1	Burgess–Snow Field at JSU Stadium; Jacksonville, AL (NCAA Division I Quarterfinal)	ESPN2	W 58–38	22,279
December 19	3:00 pm	No. 6 Sam Houston State*	No. 1	Burgess–Snow Field at JSU Stadium; Jacksonville, AL (NCAA Division I Semifinal)	ESPNU	W 62–10	23,692
January 9, 2016	11:00 am	vs. No. 2 North Dakota State*	No. 1	Toyota Stadium; Frisco, TX (NCAA Division I Championship Game)	ESPN2	L 10–37	21,836
*Non-conference game; ^{†}Homecoming; Rankings from STATS Poll released prior to the game; All times are in Central time

== Game summaries ==
=== @ Chattanooga ===
Jacksonville State @ Chattanooga

Team	1	2	3	4	Total
• #7 Gamecocks	3	7	3	10	23
#8 Mocs	10	0	3	7	20

- Date: September 5
- Location: Finley Stadium
  Chattanooga, TN
- Game start: 5:00 PM CDT
- Game attendance: 15,812
- Television network: SoCon Digital

=== @ Auburn ===
Jacksonville State @ Auburn

Team	1	2	3	4	OT	Total
#5 Gamecocks	0	10	0	10	0	20
• #6 (FBS) Tigers	3	3	7	7	7	27

- Date: September 12
- Location: Jordan–Hare Stadium
  Auburn, AL
- Game start: 11:00 AM CDT
- Game attendance: 87,451
- Television network: SECN

=== Tennessee State ===
Tennessee State @ Jacksonville State

Team	1	2	3	4	Total
Tigers	0	0	13	0	13
• #1 Gamecocks	0	21	17	10	48

- Date: September 19
- Location: JSU Stadium
  Jacksonville, AL
- Game start: 1:00 PM CDT
- Game attendance: 23,413
- Television network: ESPN3

=== @ UT Martin ===
Jacksonville State @ UT Martin

Team	1	2	3	4	Total
• #1 Gamecocks	14	14	14	6	48
Skyhawks	6	7	7	21	41

- Date: September 26
- Location: Graham Stadium
  Martin, TN
- Game start: 2:00 PM CDT
- Game attendance: 3,982
- Television network: ESPN3

=== Mississippi Valley State ===
Mississippi Valley State @ Jacksonville State

Team	1	2	3	4	Total
Delta Devils	0	7	0	0	7
• #1 Gamecocks	14	21	14	0	49

- Date: October 3
- Location: JSU Stadium
  Jacksonville, AL
- Game start: 1:00 PM CDT
- Game attendance: 13,889
- Television network: WJXS

=== @ Tennessee Tech ===
Jacksonville State @ Tennessee Tech

Team	1	2	3	4	Total
• #1 Gamecocks	14	12	9	7	42
Golden Eagles	3	3	0	7	13

- Date: October 17
- Location: Tucker Stadium
  Cookeville, TN
- Game start: 6:00 PM CDT
- Game attendance: 5,575
- Television network: OVCDN

=== @ Austin Peay ===
Jacksonville State @ Austin Peay

Team	1	2	3	4	Total
• #1 Gamecocks	10	17	0	0	27
Governors	0	0	7	0	7

- Date: October 24
- Location: Governors Stadium
  Clarksville, TN
- Game start: 4:00 PM CDT
- Game attendance: 5,411
- Television network: OVCDN

=== Eastern Kentucky ===
Eastern Kentucky @ Jacksonville State

Team	1	2	3	4	Total
#13 Colonels	0	0	0	0	0
• #1 Gamecocks	7	17	7	3	34

- Date: October 31
- Location: JSU Stadium
  Jacksonville, AL
- Game start: 1:00 PM CDT
- Game attendance: 21,988
- Television network: WJXS

=== @ Eastern Illinois ===
Jacksonville State @ Eastern Illinois

Team	1	2	3	4	Total
• #1 Gamecocks	0	3	7	14	24
Panthers	0	3	0	0	3

- Date: November 7
- Location: O'Brien Stadium
  Charleston, IL
- Game start: 1:00 PM CST
- Game attendance: 4,221
- Television network: OVCDN

=== Southeast Missouri State ===
Southeast Missouri State @ Jacksonville State

Team	1	2	3	4	Total
Redhawks	0	7	7	14	28
• #1 Gamecocks	7	14	21	14	56

- Date: November 14
- Location: JSU Stadium
  Jacksonville, AL
- Game start: 1:00 PM CST
- Game attendance: 18,995
- Television network: WJXS

=== Murray State ===
Murray State @ Jacksonville State

Team	1	2	3	4	Total
Racers	3	3	7	7	20
• #1 Gamecocks	14	7	14	7	42

- Date: November 21
- Location: JSU Stadium
  Jacksonville, AL
- Game start: 1:00 PM CST
- Game attendance: 18,555
- Television network: WJXS

=== Chattanooga—NCAA Division I Second Round ===
Chattanooga @ Jacksonville State

Team	1	2	3	4	OT	Total
#7 Mocs	7	7	7	14	0	35
• #1 Gamecocks	0	21	7	7	6	41

- Date: December 5
- Location: JSU Stadium
  Jacksonville, AL
- Game start: 2:00 PM CDT
- Game attendance: 21,452
- Television network: ESPN3

=== Charleston Southern—NCAA Division I Quarterfinal ===
Charleston Southern @ Jacksonville State

Team	1	2	3	4	Total
#9 Buccaneers	3	7	7	21	38
• #1 Gamecocks	10	3	21	24	58

- Date: December 11
- Location: JSU Stadium
  Jacksonville, AL
- Game start: 7:00 PM CDT
- Game attendance: 22,279
- Television network: ESPN2

=== Sam Houston State—NCAA Division I Semifinal ===
Sam Houston State @ Jacksonville State

Team	1	2	3	4	Total
#6 Sam Houston State	0	10	0	0	10
• #1 Gamecocks	17	24	14	7	62

- Date: December 19
- Location: JSU Stadium
  Jacksonville, AL
- Game start: 3:00 PM CDT
- Game attendance: 23,692
- Television network: ESPNU

=== North Dakota State—NCAA Division I Championship Game ===
North Dakota State vs Jacksonville State

Team	1	2	3	4	Total
• #2 North Dakota State	3	21	3	10	37
#1 Gamecocks	0	0	10	0	10

- Date: January 9, 2016
- Location: Toyota Stadium
  Frisco, TX
- Game start: 11:00 AM CDT
- Game attendance: 21,836
- Television network: ESPN2

== Ranking movements ==
Ranking movements Legend: ██ Increase in ranking ██ Decrease in ranking ( ) = First-place votes
	Week													
Poll	Pre	1	2	3	4	5	6	7	8	9	10	11	12	Final
STATS FCS	7	5 (24)	1 (39)	1 (93)	1 (89)	1 (89)	1 (89)	1 (108)	1 (107)	1 (139)	1 (149)	1 (145)	1 (135)	2
Coaches	9	6 (1)	4 (5)	3 (3)	3 (3)	3 (4)	3 (4)	2 (5)	2 (8)	1 (23)	1 (25)	1 (24)	1 (20)	2
