= 2016 NCAA Division I Football Championship Game =

Postseason college football game

2016 NCAA Division I Football Championship
- FCS National Championship Game
Jacksonville State Gamecocks	North Dakota State Bison
(13–1)	(12–2)
OVC	MVFC
10	37
Head coach: John Grass	Head coach: Chris Klieman
STATS / Seed; 1 / 1	STATS / Seed; 2 / 3
	1	2	3	4	Total
Jacksonville State	0	0	10	0	10
North Dakota State	3	21	3	10	37
- Date: January 9, 2016
- Season: 2015
- Stadium: Toyota Stadium
- Location: Frisco, Texas
- MVP: Carson Wentz (QB, North Dakota State)
- Favorite: North Dakota State by 2.5
- Referee: Tony Marcella (CAA)
- Attendance: 21,836

United States TV coverage
- Network: ESPN2
- Announcers: Anish Shroff (play-by-play), Ahmad D. Brooks (color), Quint Kessenich (sideline)

The 2016 NCAA Division I Football Championship Game was a postseason college football game that determined a national champion in the NCAA Division I Football Championship Subdivision for the 2015 season. It was played at Toyota Stadium in Frisco, Texas, on January 9, 2016, with kickoff at 12:00 noon EST, and was the culminating game of the 2015 FCS Playoffs. With sponsorship from Northwestern Mutual, the game was officially known as the NCAA FCS Football Championship Presented by Northwestern Mutual.

== Teams ==
The participants of the 2016 NCAA Division I Football Championship Game were the finalists of the 2015 FCS Playoffs, which began with a 24-team bracket. No. 1 seed Jacksonville State and No. 3 seed North Dakota State qualified for the final by winning their semifinal games.

=== Jacksonville State Gamecocks ===
The Gamecocks, led by second-year head coach John Grass, finished the regular season 10–1, 8–0 in OVC play, to earn a conference championship and the No. 1 seed in the FCS Playoffs. Jacksonville State defeated unseeded Chattanooga, No. 8 seed Charleston Southern, and unseeded Sam Houston State to reach their first ever final.

=== North Dakota State Bison ===
The Bison, led by second-year head coach Chris Klieman, finished the regular season 8–2, 7–1 in MVFC play, to earn a conference co-championship (shared with Illinois State) and the No. 3 seed in the FCS Playoffs. North Dakota State defeated unseeded Montana, unseeded Northern Iowa, and No. 7 seed Richmond to reach the final. The Bison entered the Championship game with a 4–0 record in previous FCS Championships, having won the last four straight.

== Game summary ==
=== Scoring summary ===
Scoring summary

Quarter	Time	Drive			Team	Scoring information	Score	
Quarter	Time	Plays	Yards	TOP	Team	Scoring information	JVST	NDSU
1	8:36	15	63	6:24	NDSU	29-yard field goal by Cam Pedersen	0	3
2	12:39	12	80	6:55	NDSU	Andrew Bonnet 8-yard touchdown reception from Carson Wentz, Cam Pedersen kick good	0	10
2	11:13	4	28	1:15	NDSU	Carson Wentz 11-yard touchdown run, Cam Pedersen kick good	0	17
2	6:12	6	48	2:56	NDSU	King Frazier 1-yard touchdown run, Cam Pedersen kick good	0	24
3	11:04	8	73	3:56	JVST	Eli Jenkins 6-yard touchdown run, Connor Rouleau kick good	7	24
3	3:41	4	4	1:30	JVST	26-yard field goal by Connor Rouleau	10	24
3	0:20	8	60	3:21	NDSU	31-yard field goal by Cam Pedersen	10	27
4	7:45	8	28	4:22	NDSU	Carson Wentz 1-yard touchdown run, Cam Pedersen kick good	10	34
4	4:22	4	2	2:19	NDSU	38-yard field goal by Cam Pedersen	10	37
"TOP" = time of possession. For other American football terms, see Glossary of American football.							10	37

=== Game statistics ===
	1	2	3	4	Total
No. 1 Gamecocks	0	0	10	0	10
No. 3 Bison	3	21	3	10	37

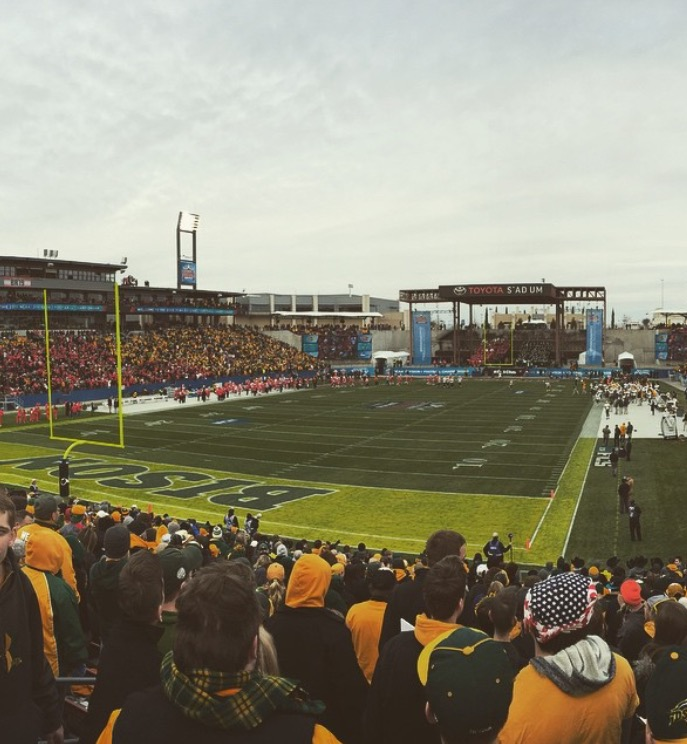
Toyota Stadium during the championship game between North Dakota State and Jacksonville State

Statistics	JVST	NDSU
First downs	9	24
Plays–yards	51–204	82–379
Rushes–yards	31–147	51–182
Passing yards	57	197
Passing: comp–att–int	7–20–2	16–31–3
Time of possession	19:09	40:51

Team	Category	Player	Statistics
Jacksonville State	Passing	Eli Jenkins	7/20, 57 yds, 2 INT
Jacksonville State	Rushing	Eli Jenkins	15 car, 88 yds, 1 TD
Jacksonville State	Receiving	Josh Barge	2 rec, 32 yds
North Dakota State	Passing	Carson Wentz	16/29, 197 yds, 1 TD, 2 INT
North Dakota State	Rushing	Carson Wentz	9 car, 79 yds, 2 TD
North Dakota State	Receiving	Darrius Shepherd	4 rec, 71 yds
