= 2015 North Dakota State Bison football team =

American college football season

2015 North Dakota State Bison football

NCAA Division I champion MVFC co-champion

NCAA Division I Championship, W 37–10 vs. Jacksonville State
- Conference: Missouri Valley Football Conference

Ranking
- STATS: No. 1
- FCS Coaches: No. 1
- Record: 13–2 (7–1 MVFC)
- Head coach: Chris Klieman (2nd season)
- Offensive coordinator: Tim Polasek (2nd season)
- Offensive scheme: West Coast
- Defensive coordinator: Matt Entz (2nd season)
- Base defense: 3–4
- Home stadium: Fargodome

2015 Missouri Valley Football Conference standings
	Conf.			Overall
Team	W		L	W		L
No. 1 North Dakota State +^	7	–	1	13	–	2
No. 5 Illinois State +^	7	–	1	10	–	3
No. 8 Northern Iowa ^	5	–	3	9	–	5
No. 15 South Dakota State ^	5	–	3	8	–	4
Western Illinois ^	5	–	3	7	–	6
Indiana State	3	–	5	5	–	6
Youngstown State	3	–	5	5	–	6
South Dakota	3	–	5	5	–	6
Southern Illinois	2	–	6	3	–	8
Missouri State	0	–	8	1	–	10
+ – Conference co-champions; ^ – FCS playoff participant; Rankings from STATS Poll

The 2015 North Dakota State Bison football team represented North Dakota State University in the 2015 NCAA Division I FCS football season. They were led by second-year head coach Chris Klieman. The team, which played its 23rd season in the Fargodome, entered the season as the four-time defending national champions. The Bison have been members of the Missouri Valley Football Conference (MVFC) since the 2008 season.

The Bison went 13–2 on the season, won their fifth straight MVFC title, and their fifth consecutive NCAA Division I Football Championship, becoming the first-ever NCAA football team to win five straight championships at any level. Yale won six straight college football national championships from 1879 to 1884, before the NCAA was formed.

== Schedule ==
Date	Time	Opponent	Rank	Site	TV	Result	Attendance
August 29	2:30 pm	at No. 13 Montana*	No. 1	Washington–Grizzly Stadium; Missoula, MT (FCS Kickoff)	ESPN	L 35–38	26,472 (R)
September 12	2:30 pm	Weber State*	No. 2	Fargodome; Fargo, ND	NBC ND/ESPN3	W 41–14	18,801
September 19	2:30 pm	North Dakota*	No. 4	Fargodome; Fargo, ND (Rivalry)	NBC ND/ESPN3	W 34–9	19,044
October 3	6:00 pm	at No. 5 South Dakota State	No. 3	Coughlin–Alumni Stadium; Brookings, SD (Dakota Marker)	Midco/NBC ND/ESPN3	W 28–7	17,348 (R)
October 10	6:00 pm	No. 10 Northern Iowa^{†}	No. 3	Fargodome; Fargo, ND	NBC ND/ESPN3	W 31–28	18,954
October 17	2:30 pm	South Dakota	No. 2	Fargodome; Fargo, ND	Midco/NBC ND/ESPN3	L 21–24	18,420
October 24	12:00 pm	at No. 18 Indiana State	No. 8	Memorial Stadium; Terre Haute, IN	MVC TV/ESPN3	W 28–14	6,524
October 31	2:00 pm	at Southern Illinois	No. 7	Saluki Stadium; Carbondale, IL	NBC ND/ESPN3	W 35–29	6,508
November 7	2:30 pm	Western Illinois	No. 6	Fargodome; Fargo, ND (Harvest Bowl)	NBC ND/ESPN3	W 59–7	18,251
November 14	1:00 pm	at No. 20 Youngstown State	No. 2	Stambaugh Stadium; Youngstown, OH	NBC ND/ESPN3	W 27–24	11,309
November 21	2:00 pm	Missouri State	No. 2	Fargodome; Fargo, ND	NBC ND/ESPN3	W 55–0	18,624
December 5	2:30 pm	No. 16 Montana*	No. 2	Fargodome; Fargo, ND (FCS playoffs second round)	ESPN3	W 37–6	18,232
December 12	11:00 am	No. 15 Northern Iowa*	No. 2	Fargodome; Fargo, ND (FCS Playoffs Quarterfinals)	ESPN2	W 23–13	18,041
December 18	7:00 pm	No. 12 Richmond*	No. 2	Fargodome; Fargo, ND (FCS Playoffs Semifinals)	ESPN2	W 33–7	18,105
January 9, 2016	11:00 am	vs. No. 1 Jacksonville State*	No. 2	Toyota Stadium; Frisco, TX (FCS National Championship Game)	ESPN2	W 37–10	21,836
*Non-conference game; ^{†}Homecoming; Rankings from STATS Poll released prior to the game; All times are in Central time

- Source: (R) indicates record attendance.

== Coaching staff ==
Name	Position	Year at North Dakota State	Alma mater (Year)
Chris Klieman	Head coach	5th	Northern Iowa (1990)
Matt Entz	Defensive coordinator Linebackers	2nd	Wayne State (NE) (1995)
Tim Polasek	Offensive coordinator Running backs	9th	Concordia (WI) (2002)
Atif Austin	Special teams coordinator Wide receiver coach	2nd	Iowa State (2003)
Jamar Cain	Defensive ends coach	2nd	New Mexico State (2002)
Nick Goeser	Defensive tackles coach	6th	Wisconsin–Eau Claire (2003)
Randy Hedberg	Quarterbacks coach	2nd	Minot State (1977)
Joe Klanderman	Defensive backs coach	2nd	Minnesota State Mankato (2001)
Tyler Roehl	Tight ends Fullbacks	2nd	North Dakota State (2009)
Brian Gordon	Director of football operations Equipment services	2nd	South Florida (2002)
Jake Otten	Video coordinator	2nd	Cal Poly (2013)

== Roster ==
2015 North Dakota State Bison Football
Quarterback: 5 Michael Veldman – Freshman; 7 Cole Davis – Sophomore; 11 Carson Wentz – Senior; 12 Easton Stick – (redshirt) Freshman; 17 James Hendricks – Freshman *; Tailback: 8 Darius Anderson – Senior (+WR); 10 Lance Dunn – (redshirt) Freshman; 22 King Frazier – Junior; 24 Demaris Purifoy – Freshman *; 25 Chase Morlock – Junior; 37 Garrett Malstrom – Freshman; 42 Bruce Anderson – Freshman *; Fullback: 30 Jedre Cyr – Senior; 34 Brock Robbins – Freshman *; 40 Dan Sargeant – Sophomore; 46 Andrew Bonnet – Senior (+TE); Wide receiver: 4 Dimitri Williams – Freshman *; 9 Colter Pritchard – Sophomore; 13 Eric Perkins – Junior; 15 Daniel Polanski – Sophomore; 16 RJ Urzendowski – Sophomore; 18 Khayvon Hawkins – (redshirt) Freshman; 20 Darrius Shepherd – (redshirt) Freshman; 33 Marquise Bridges – Freshman *; 80 Nate Moody – Senior; 81 Isaiah Frandsen – Sophomore; 82 Zach Vraa – Senior; 83 Dallas Freeman – (redshirt) Freshman; Tight end: 39 Ben Ellefson – Freshman *; 49 Matt Anderson – Freshman *; 85 Nate Jenson – (redshirt) Freshman; 86 Jeff Illies – Sophomore; 87 Connor Wentz – Sophomore; 88 Luke Albers – Senior; 89 Isaac Lashua – (redshirt) Freshman	Offensive lineman: 53 Max Haskins - OL – Freshman; 54 Jeremy Kelly - OG – Senior; 58 Andrew Trzebiatowski - OT – Freshman; 59 Joe Haeg - OT – Senior; 60 Max Polson - C – Sophomore; 64 Colin Conner - OT – (redshirt) Freshman; 65 Jack Albrecht - OG – Freshman *; 66 Zack Johnson - OG – (redshirt) Junior; 67 Brock Russell - OG – Senior; 68 Zack Johnson - OT – Freshman *; 70 Jack Plankers - OT – Junior; 71 Luke Bacon - OT – (redshirt) Freshman; 72 Erik Olson - OT – Sophomore; 73 Zack Ziemer - OG – Sophomore; 74 Tanner Volson - OG – (redshirt) Freshman; 75 Austin Kuhnert - C – Sophomore; 76 Trent Mooney - OG – Freshman *; 77 Christian Triplett - C – (redshirt) Freshman; 78 Landon Lechler - OT – Junior; Defensive tackle: 57 Bryan Carlton – Freshman *; 61 Brian Schaetz – Senior; 62 Bryce Messner – Sophomore; 63 Aaron Steidl – (redshirt) Freshman; 69 Blake Williams – (redshirt) Freshman; 90 Grant Morgan – Sophomore; 92 Jack Darnell – Freshman *; 95 Connor Hubbs – Freshman *; 98 Austin Farnlof – Junior; 99 Nate Tanguay – Sophomore; Defensive end: 53 Cole Karcz – Freshman *; 56 Caleb Butler – (redshirt) Freshman; 91 Derrek Tuszka – Freshman *; 93 Jarrod Tuszka – Sophomore; 94 Stanley Jones – (redshirt) Freshman; 96 Greg Menard – Sophomore; 97 Brad Ambrosius – Junior; Placekicker: 36 Cam Pedersen – Freshman	Linebacker: 1 Chris Board – Sophomore; 14 Bo Liekhus – Junior; 41 MJ Stumpf – Junior; 43 Kurt Mattox – Sophomore; 44 Matt Plank – Sophomore; 45 Levi Jordheim – (redshirt) Freshman; 47 Pierre Gee-Tucker – Junior; 48 Dan Marlette – (redshirt) Freshman; 49 Nick DeLuca – Junior; 50 Gray Gochenour – Freshman; 52 Jake Brinkman – Freshman *; 55 Aaron Mercadel – Freshman *; Cornerback: 2 Quinten McCoy – Junior; 5 Jordan Champion – Senior; 6 CJ Smith – Senior; 19 Dom Davis – Freshman *; 21 Jalen Allison – (redshirt) Freshman; 29 Eric Bachmeier – (redshirt) Freshman; 31 Bryce Bennot – (redshirt) Freshman; 31 Ty Brooks – Freshman *; 32 Dakota Reid – (redshirt) Freshman; 34 Ross Effertz – Freshman; 37 Tre Fort – Freshman; Safety: 3 Tre Dempsey - FS – Sophomore; 8 Braden Sikes - SS – Freshman *; 23 Jaylaan Wimbush - SS – (redshirt) Freshman; 26 Keenan Hodenfield - FS – Sophomore; 27 Isaac Cenescar - SS – (redshirt) Freshman; 28 Andrew Smith - FS – Junior; 35 Robbie Grimsley - SS – Freshman *; 38 Jaxon Brown - SS – Freshman *; Punter: 9 Ian Gallagher – (redshirt) Freshman; 19 Ben LeCompte – Senior (+K); Long Snappers: 51 James Fisher – Sophomore; 95 Peder Olson – (redshirt) Freshman (+LB)
* : 2015 NDSU Bison Football Commits (02/04/2015)

== Recruiting class ==
College recruiting information (2015)
Name	Hometown	School	Height	Weight	Commit date
Ben Ellefson #76 TE	Hawley, MN	Hawley Secondary	6 ft 3 in (1.91 m)	243 lb (110 kg)	February 04, 2015 (Signed)
Ben Ellefson #76 TE	Recruit ratings: 247Sports:				
Aaron Mercadel #113 MLB	Oakland, CA	Saint Mary's College High School	5 ft 11 in (1.80 m)	196 lb (89 kg)	February 04, 2015 (Signed)
Aaron Mercadel #113 MLB	Recruit ratings: 247Sports:				
Jack Darnell #190 DT	Champlin, MN	Champlin Park High School	6 ft 2 in (1.88 m)	277 lb (126 kg)	February 04, 2015 (Signed)
Jack Darnell #190 DT	Recruit ratings: 247Sports:				
Bryan Carlton #145 DE	Chanhassen, MN	Minnetonka High School	6 ft 3 in (1.91 m)	246 lb (112 kg)	February 04, 2015 (Signed)
Bryan Carlton #145 DE	Recruit ratings: 247Sports:				
Derrek Tuszka #136 DE	Warner, SD	Warner High School	6 ft 5 in (1.96 m)	226 lb (103 kg)	February 04, 2015 (Signed)
Derrek Tuszka #136 DE	Recruit ratings: 247Sports:				
Matt Anderson #133 TE	Lakeland, MN	Stillwater High School	6 ft 4 in (1.93 m)	228 lb (103 kg)	February 04, 2015 (Signed)
Matt Anderson #133 TE	Recruit ratings: 247Sports:				
Trent Mooney #226 OT	Lamar, MO	Lamar High School	6 ft 5 in (1.96 m)	269 lb (122 kg)	February 04, 2015 (Signed)
Trent Mooney #226 OT	Recruit ratings: 247Sports:				
Robbie Grimsley #221 ATH (S)	Hutchinson, MN	Hutchinson High School	6 ft 0 in (1.83 m)	181 lb (82 kg)	February 04, 2015 (Signed)
Robbie Grimsley #221 ATH (S)	Recruit ratings: 247Sports:				
Connor Hubbs #201 DT	White Bear Lake, MN	White Bear Lake High School	6 ft 1 in (1.85 m)	283 lb (128 kg)	February 04, 2015 (Signed)
Connor Hubbs #201 DT	Recruit ratings: 247Sports:				
Braden Sikes #230 ATH (S)	Excelsior, MN	Minnetonka High School	5 ft 11 in (1.80 m)	192 lb (87 kg)	February 04, 2015 (Signed)
Braden Sikes #230 ATH (S)	Recruit ratings: 247Sports:				
Dimitri Williams #232 ATH (WR)	Lakeville, MN	Rosemount High School	5 ft 11 in (1.80 m)	174 lb (79 kg)	February 04, 2015 (Signed)
Dimitri Williams #232 ATH (WR)	Recruit ratings: 247Sports:				
James Hendricks #243 ATH (QB)	Laporte, MN	Bemidji High School	6 ft 1 in (1.85 m)	189 lb (86 kg)	February 04, 2015 (Signed)
James Hendricks #243 ATH (QB)	Recruit ratings: 247Sports:				
Marquise Bridges #327 WR	Brooklyn Park, MN	DeLaSalle High School	5 ft 11 in (1.80 m)	170 lb (77 kg)	February 04, 2015 (Signed)
Marquise Bridges #327 WR	Recruit ratings: 247Sports:				
Zack Johnson #324 OT	Blaine, MN	Spring Lake Park High School	6 ft 6 in (1.98 m)	276 lb (125 kg)	February 04, 2015 (Signed)
Zack Johnson #324 OT	Recruit ratings: 247Sports:				
Ty Brooks; CB	Fargo, ND	Fargo South High School	5 ft 9 in (1.75 m)	161 lb (73 kg)	February 04, 2015 (Signed)
Ty Brooks; CB	Recruit ratings: No ratings found				
Jaxon Brown; S	Eau Claire, WI	Regis High School	6 ft 2 in (1.88 m)	189 lb (86 kg)	February 04, 2015 (Signed)
Jaxon Brown; S	Recruit ratings: No ratings found				
Demaris Purifoy; RB	Wauwatosa, WI	Wauwatosa West High School	6 ft 1 in (1.85 m)	188 lb (85 kg)	February 04, 2015 (Signed)
Demaris Purifoy; RB	Recruit ratings: No ratings found				
Brock Robbins; FB	Cavalier, ND	Cavalier High School	6 ft 1 in (1.85 m)	230 lb (100 kg)	February 04, 2015 (Signed)
Brock Robbins; FB	Recruit ratings: No ratings found				
Cole Karcz; TE -> DE	Germantown, MN	Germantown High School	6 ft 4 in (1.93 m)	233 lb (106 kg)	February 04, 2015 (Signed)
Cole Karcz; TE -> DE	Recruit ratings: No ratings found				
Bruce Anderson; RB	Ruskin, FL	Newsome High School	5 ft 11 in (1.80 m)	202 lb (92 kg)	February 04, 2015 (Signed)
Bruce Anderson; RB	Recruit ratings: No ratings found				
Jake Brinkman; OLB	North Liberty, IA	Regina High School	6 ft 0 in (1.83 m)	210 lb (95 kg)	February 04, 2015 (Signed)
Jake Brinkman; OLB	Recruit ratings: No ratings found				
Dominic Davis; ATH (CB)	Belleville, IL	Belleville West High School	5 ft 11 in (1.80 m)	175 lb (79 kg)	February 04, 2015 (Signed)
Dominic Davis; ATH (CB)	Recruit ratings: No ratings found				
Jack Albrecht; OG	Rolling Meadows, IL	Fremd High School	6 ft 5 in (1.96 m)	276 lb (125 kg)	February 04, 2015 (Signed)
Jack Albrecht; OG	Recruit ratings: No ratings found				
Overall recruit ranking: Scout: - 247Sports: #131 ESPN: -
Note: In many cases, Scout, Rivals, 247Sports, On3, and ESPN may conflict in their listings of height and weight.; In these cases, the average was taken. ESPN grades are on a 100-point scale.; Sources: "2015 Team Ranking". Rivals.com.

== Game summaries ==
=== At Montana ===
	1	2	3	4	Total
#1 Bison	7	21	0	7	35
#13 Grizzlies	10	11	7	10	38

=== Weber State ===
	1	2	3	4	Total
Wildcats	7	0	0	7	14
#2 Bison	7	21	3	10	41

=== North Dakota ===
	1	2	3	4	Total
North Dakota	3	0	6	0	9
#4 Bison	3	21	10	0	34

=== At South Dakota State ===
	1	2	3	4	Total
#3 Bison	7	14	7	0	28
#5 Jackrabbits	0	0	7	0	7

=== Northern Iowa ===
	1	2	3	4	Total
#10 Panthers	7	7	0	14	28
#3 Bison	3	7	0	21	31

=== South Dakota ===
	1	2	3	4	Total
Coyotes	0	14	0	10	24
#2 Bison	14	7	0	0	21

=== At Indiana State ===
	1	2	3	4	Total
#8 Bison	7	7	14	0	28
#18 Sycamores	0	7	7	0	14

=== At Southern Illinois ===
	1	2	3	4	Total
#7 Bison	7	7	7	14	35
Salukis	3	7	9	10	29

=== Western Illinois ===
	1	2	3	4	Total
Leathernecks	0	0	7	0	7
#6 Bison	17	21	7	14	59

=== At Youngstown State ===
	1	2	3	4	Total
#2 Bison	0	3	7	17	27
#20 Penguins	7	7	10	0	24

=== Missouri State ===
	1	2	3	4	Total
Bears	0	0	0	0	0
#2 Bison	14	27	14	0	55

== FCS playoffs ==
=== Second round – Montana ===
	1	2	3	4	Total
#16 Grizzlies	0	0	6	0	6
#2 Bison	7	14	10	6	37

=== Quarterfinals–Northern Iowa ===
	1	2	3	4	Total
#15 Panthers	7	3	0	3	13
#2 Bison	7	0	7	9	23

=== Semifinals–Richmond ===
	1	2	3	4	Total
#12 Spiders	0	0	7	0	7
#2 Bison	13	13	0	7	33

=== Championship–Jacksonville State ===
	1	2	3	4	Total
#2 Bison	3	21	3	10	37
#1 Gamecocks	0	0	10	0	10

== Ranking movements ==
Ranking movements Legend: ██ Increase in ranking ██ Decrease in ranking т = Tied with team above or below ( ) = First-place votes
	Week													
Poll	Pre	1	2	3	4	5	6	7	8	9	10	11	12	Final
STATS FCS	1 (144)	2 (22)	4 (23)	3 (17)	3 (16)	3 (20)	2 (27)	8	7	6	2	2	2 (2)	1 (150)
Coaches	1 (24)	2–T (6)	2	2 (4)	2 (4)	2 (6)	2 (5)	8	6	5–T	3	3	3 (5)	1 (24)

== 2016 NFL draftees ==
Player	Round	Pick	Position	NFL Club
Carson Wentz	1	2	Quarterback	Philadelphia Eagles
Joe Haeg	5	155	Guard	Indianapolis Colts
