= Carson Wentz =

American football player (born 1992)

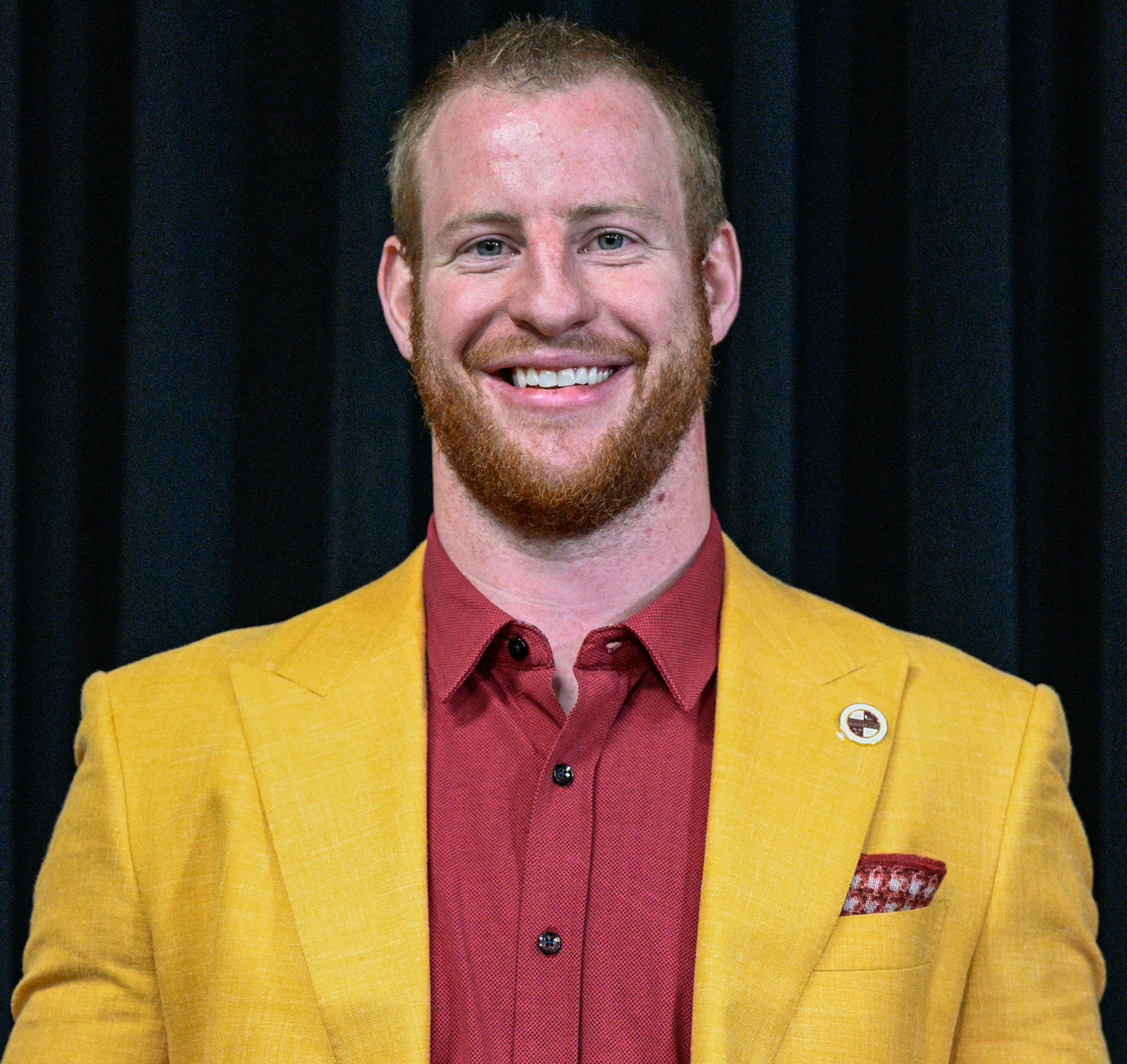
- Wentz at a Commanders press conference in 2022

No. 11 – Minnesota Vikings
- Position: Quarterback
- Roster status: Active

Personal information
- Born: December 30, 1992 (age 33); Raleigh, North Carolina, U.S.
- Listed height: 6 ft 5 in (1.96 m)
- Listed weight: 237 lb (108 kg)

Career information
- High school: Century (Bismarck, North Dakota)
- College: North Dakota State (2011–2015)
- NFL draft: 2016: 1st round, 2nd overall pick

Career history
- Philadelphia Eagles (2016–2020); Indianapolis Colts (2021); Washington Commanders (2022); Los Angeles Rams (2023); Kansas City Chiefs (2024); Minnesota Vikings (2025–present)

Awards and highlights
- Super Bowl champion (LII); Second-team All-Pro (2017); Pro Bowl (2017); Bert Bell Award (2017); 5× FCS national champion (2011–2015)

Career NFL statistics as of Week 10, 2026
- Passing attempts: 3,560
- Passing completions: 2,226
- Completion percentage: 62.5%
- TD–INT: 162–74
- Passing yards: 23,983
- Passer rating: 88.8
- Rushing yards: 1,480
- Rushing touchdowns: 11
- Stats at Pro Football Reference

Carson James Wentz (born December 30, 1992) is an American professional football quarterback for the Minnesota Vikings of the National Football League (NFL). He played college football for the North Dakota State Bison, winning two consecutive NCAA FCS national championships between 2014 and 2015. Wentz was selected second overall by the Philadelphia Eagles in the 2016 NFL draft, making him the highest drafted FCS player.

Wentz's most successful season was in 2017 when he helped the Eagles obtain their conference's top seed, despite suffering a season-ending injury which led to them winning the franchise's first Super Bowl title in Super Bowl LII. He also earned Pro Bowl and second-team All-Pro honors. Wentz helped take Philadelphia back to the playoffs during his next two seasons, but further injuries limited his participation. After losing his starting position due to a production decline, Wentz spent his next four seasons as a starter and backup with the Indianapolis Colts, Washington Commanders, Los Angeles Rams, and Kansas City Chiefs. He joined the Vikings in 2025.

== Early life ==
Born in Raleigh, North Carolina, Wentz moved to North Dakota with his family at the age of three. He played quarterback and defensive back for the football team at Century High School in Bismarck, and also played basketball and baseball at the school. Inspired by his older brother, he had played ice hockey up until high school, before deciding to join the basketball team. As a freshman, Wentz was 5 ft 8 in (1.73 m) in height, grew to 6 ft 5 in (1.96 m) as a senior, and graduated in 2011 as valedictorian of his class.

== College career ==
Wentz attended North Dakota State, redshirting his first season with the Bison as they won their first Football Championship Subdivision (FCS) title under ninth-year head coach Craig Bohl.

As a redshirt freshman in 2012, Wentz was the backup quarterback to Brock Jensen and played in his first collegiate game on September 22. He completed all eight of his passes for 93 yards and threw his first touchdown in relief of Jensen in a 66–7 blowout victory over the Prairie View A&M Panthers. Wentz finished the season completing 12-of-16 passes for 144 yards and two touchdowns.

Wentz was again the second-string quarterback in 2013 and appeared in 11 games. He had his best game that season on October 13, against Delaware State, completing 10-of-13 passes for 105 yards and a touchdown. Wentz finished his redshirt sophomore season completing 22-of-30 passes for 209 yards and a touchdown.

Wentz became the Bison starting quarterback during his junior year in 2014. In his first start in the opener against the Iowa State Cyclones of the Big 12 Conference, Wentz completed 18-of-28 pass attempts for 204 yards in a 34–14 victory on August 30. During the game against the Western Illinois Leathernecks on October 10, he caught a 16-yard touchdown pass from running back John Crockett and helped lead the Bison to a 17–10 comeback victory. Statistically, Wentz's best game that season was against the Missouri State Bears, where he threw for 247 yards and five touchdowns.

Wentz led NDSU to a 15–1 record. On January 10, 2015, he started in his first national championship game against the Illinois State Redbirds and passed for 287 yards and a touchdown and rushed for 87 yards and scored a touchdown on a five-yard run to give the Bison the lead with 37 seconds left. NDSU won their fourth consecutive NCAA Division I Football Championship game, 29–27. Wentz started all 16 games in 2014, completing 228 of 358 passes for 3,111 yards, 25 touchdowns, and 10 interceptions. He was also the team's second leading rusher, rushing for 642 yards and six touchdowns.

As a fifth-year senior in 2015, Wentz had one of the best games of his career on October 10 against the Northern Iowa Panthers, when he passed for a career-high 335 yards. The following week against the South Dakota Coyotes, Wentz suffered a broken wrist in the first half but managed to complete the game with 16-of-28 completions for 195 yards and two touchdowns as the Bison lost 24–21. After starting the first six games of the season and completing 63.7 percent of his passes for a total of 1,454 yards and 16 touchdowns, Wentz missed the next eight weeks of the season after undergoing surgery to his broken throwing wrist. He returned to practice in the beginning of December and was cleared to play in the national championship. On January 9, 2016, Wentz led the Bison to its fifth straight FCS title, running for two touchdowns and throwing for a third. He was named the NCAA Division I-AA Championship Game Most Outstanding Player for the second straight year.

Wentz graduated with a degree in health and physical education, finishing with a 4.0 grade point average and twice earning recognition as an Academic All-American by the College Sports Information Directors of America, first for Division I football and later for all Division I sports.

== Professional career ==
=== Pre-draft ===
Pre-draft measurables
Height	Weight	Arm length	Hand span	Wingspan	40-yard dash	10-yard split	20-yard split	20-yard shuttle	Three-cone drill	Vertical jump	Broad jump	Wonderlic
6 ft 5 1/4 in (1.96 m)	237 lb (108 kg)	33 1/4 in (0.84 m)	10 in (0.25 m)	6 ft 6 3/4 in (2.00 m)	4.77 s	1.54 s	2.75 s	4.15 s	6.86 s	30.5 in (0.77 m)	9 ft 10 in (3.00 m)	40
All values from NFL Combine

In February 2016, most analysts had Wentz projected to be selected in the mid-first round of the draft. However, Wentz began to be regarded as a Top 10 prospect after his pro day. On January 30, 2016, Wentz played in the 2016 Reese's Senior Bowl and finished the game completing 6 of 10 pass attempts for 50 yards. At the NFL Scouting Combine, Wentz showcased his athleticism as he was in the top three in the 40-yard dash, the broad jump, and the three-cone drill among all quarterbacks. Wentz also reportedly scored a 40/50 on his Wonderlic test.

=== Philadelphia Eagles ===
==== 2016 season ====
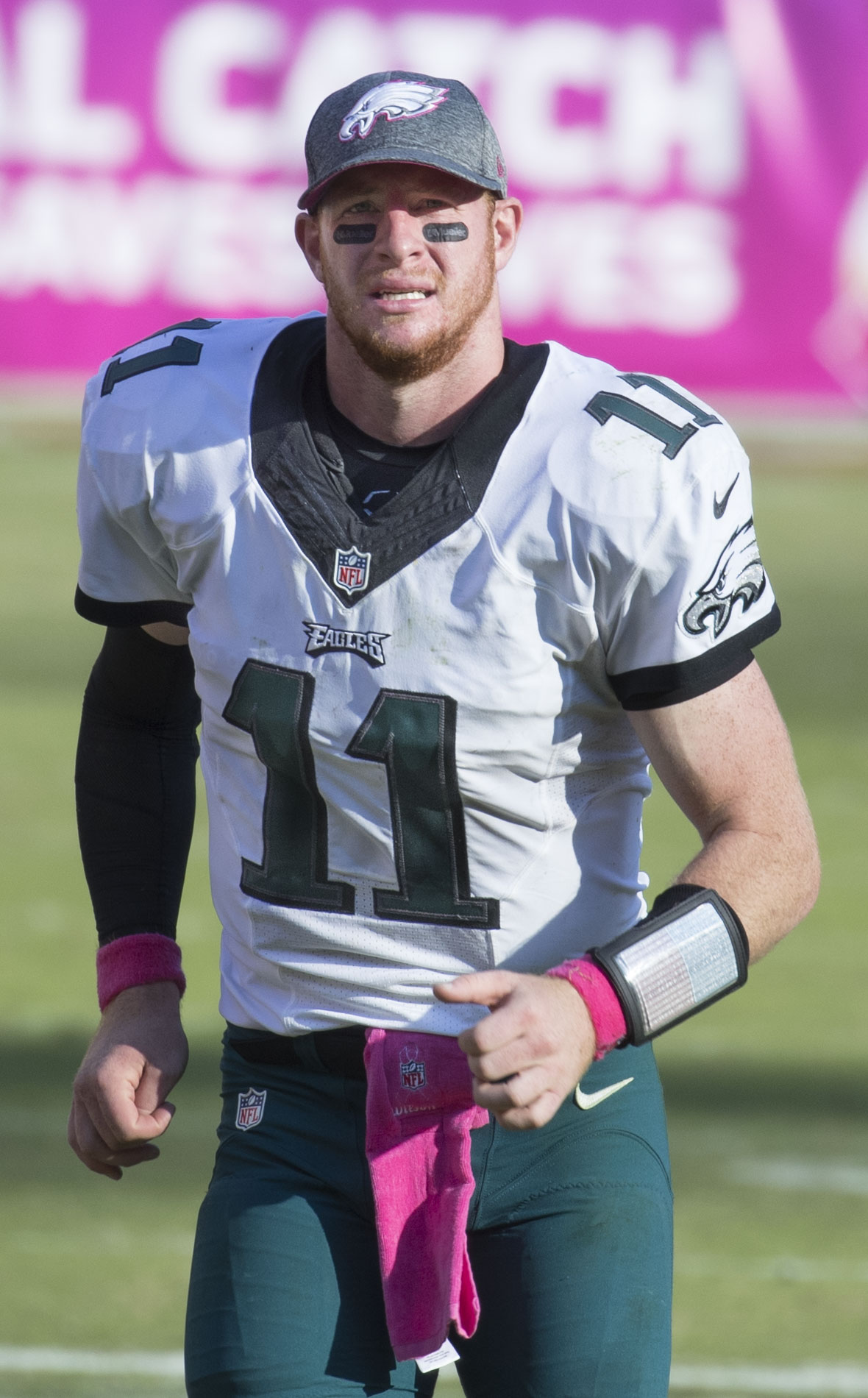
Wentz in 2016

On April 28, 2016, the Philadelphia Eagles selected Wentz in the first round with the second overall pick in the 2016 NFL draft. He was the first quarterback the Eagles selected in the first round of an NFL draft since Donovan McNabb in 1999, who was also taken second overall. Wentz was also the highest-selected FCS quarterback taken in draft history and the first FCS quarterback taken in the first round since Joe Flacco in 2008. The Eagles traded three top 100 picks in 2016, a first round pick in 2017, and a second round pick in 2018 in order to move up in the draft order and get him. On May 12, Wentz signed a four-year, fully guaranteed contract worth $26.67 million .

Wentz suffered a rib injury in the team's first preseason game of 2016, but was fully healthy for the beginning of the 2016 regular season. Originally intending to have Wentz sit and learn for the 2016 season, those plans changed when the Eagles traded quarterback Sam Bradford to the Minnesota Vikings in September. That same day, it was also reported that the team planned to start Wentz for the 2016 season when he became healthy. On September 5, Wentz was named the starter for the season-opener against the Cleveland Browns. In that game, he threw for 278 yards and two touchdowns during the 29–10 victory. Wentz was named the Pepsi NFL Rookie of the Week for Week 1. In the next game against the Chicago Bears, he threw for 190 yards and a touchdown during the 29–14 road victory. He became the first rookie quarterback since 1970 to win his first two games of the season and not throw an interception. The following week against the Pittsburgh Steelers, Wentz had 301 passing yards and two touchdowns as the Eagles won 34–3. He was named the National Football Conference (NFC) Offensive Player of the Week for his performance against the Steelers. During a Week 9 28–23 road loss to the New York Giants, he was 27-of-47 for a season-high 364 yards and two interceptions.

In his rookie season, Wentz started all 16 games for the Eagles as they finished the season with a 7–9 record. Wentz threw for a league-record 379 completions by a rookie, breaking the record of 354 held by Bradford, who was with the St. Louis Rams at the time. His 379 completions also set a single season franchise record, breaking the record of 346 also held by Bradford from the previous season. Wentz also set a single season franchise record with 607 pass attempts, the second highest attempts by a rookie in league history only trailing Andrew Luck, who had 627 in the 2012 season.

==== 2017 season ====
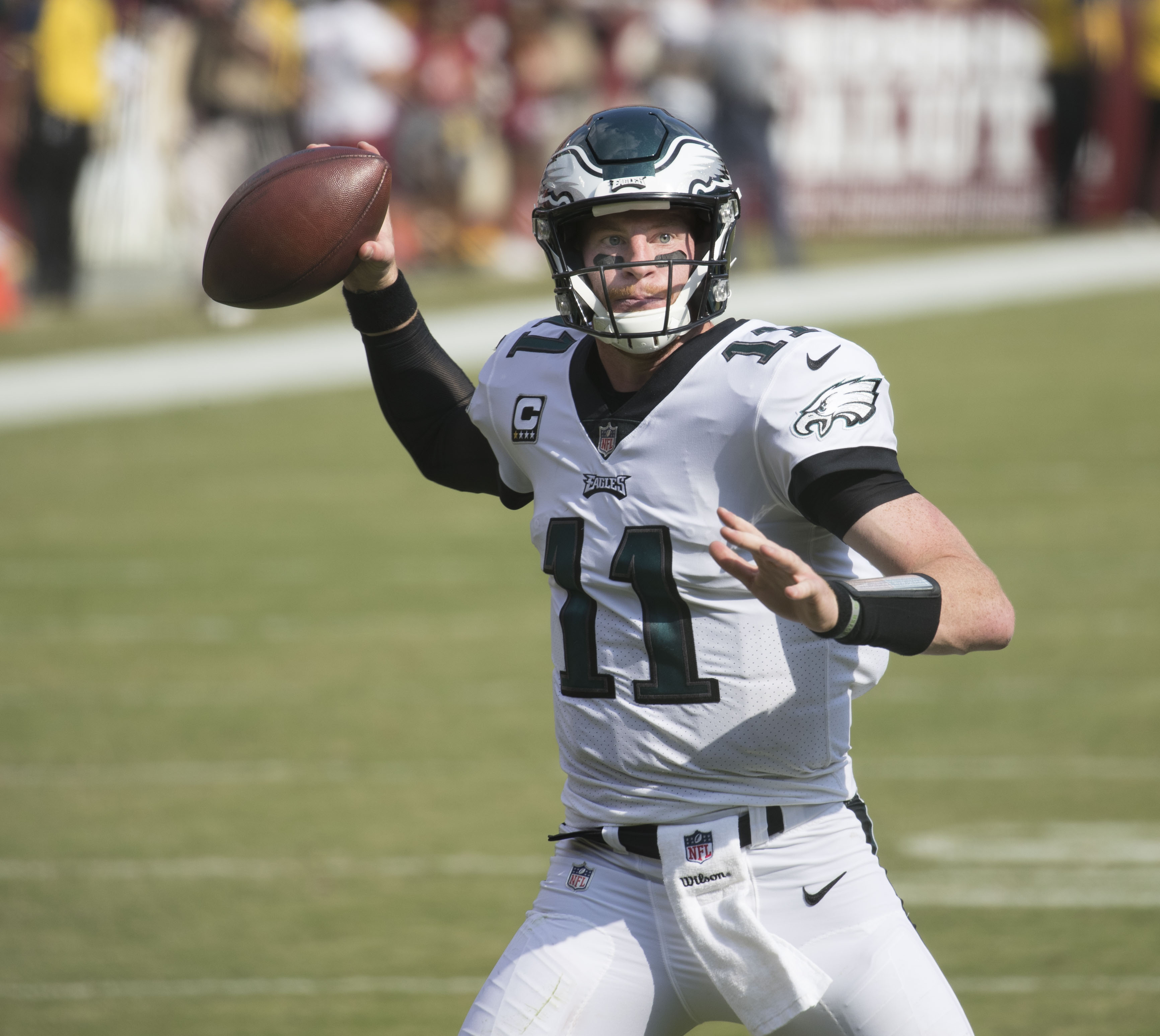
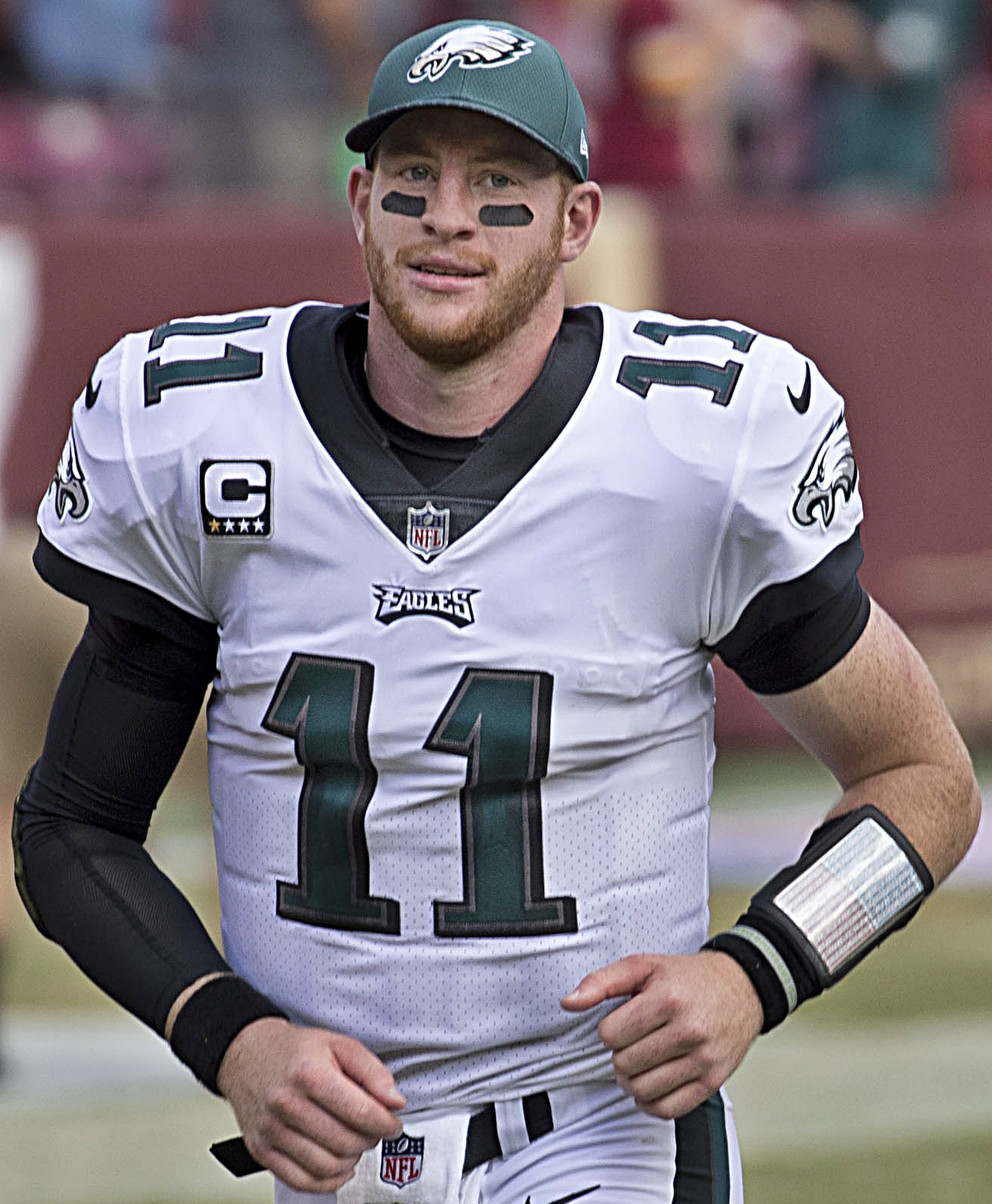
Wentz in 2017

In Week 1 against the Washington Redskins, Wentz finished with 307 passing yards, two touchdowns, and an interception from a pass tipped at the line of scrimmage as the Eagles won by a score of 30–17. In the next game against the Kansas City Chiefs, Wentz threw for 333 yards, two touchdowns, and an interception. In addition, he rushed for 55 yards in the 27–20 road loss. In a Week 5 34–7 rout over the Arizona Cardinals, Wentz finished the game with 304 yards and a career-high four passing touchdowns. In the first five games of 2017, he passed for 1,362 yards, 10 touchdowns, and three interceptions. After this start, NFL insiders and reports ranked Wentz as a possible NFL MVP. He was named the NFC Offensive Player of the Week for Week 7 after passing for 268 yards and a career-high tying four touchdowns in a 34–24 victory over the Redskins. Two weeks later against the Denver Broncos, Wentz finished with 199 passing yards and four touchdowns as the Eagles won 51–23.

During Week 14 against the Los Angeles Rams, Wentz left the game due to an apparent knee injury. He finished with 291 passing yards, four touchdowns, and an interception as the Eagles won on the road 43–35. The victory earned Wentz's first NFC East title in the Pederson/Wentz era. The next day, an MRI revealed that he suffered a torn ACL, keeping Wentz out for the rest of the season. In 13 starts, Wentz finished the year with 3,296 passing yards, 33 touchdowns, seven interceptions, a 60.2 completion percentage, and a 101.9 quarterback rating. On December 13, Wentz underwent successful surgery on his ACL. Wentz was selected to his first Pro Bowl on December 19, but could not participate due to the aftermath of his recent knee surgery. Wentz was ranked third by his fellow players on the NFL Top 100 Players of 2018. Led by Nick Foles, the Eagles beat the New England Patriots 41–33 in Super Bowl LII, the first Super Bowl win in franchise history.

In 2022, an article in The Philadelphia Inquirer reported that prior to Super Bowl LII, Wentz expressed displeasure to other injured teammates that the Eagles were seeing success without him. Wentz was immediately confronted by one of the players and the two had to be physically separated. Later in November 2022, former teammate Darren Sproles, who was on the Super Bowl winning team, revealed that he had a conversation with Wentz saying: "I had to make him realize that you [have to] be happy for the team. We’re all mad that we’re not playing; we’re all hurt, but you still [have to] be happy for the team."

==== 2018 season ====
On June 25, 2018, prior to the start of the new season, Wentz was ranked third overall in the NFL Top 100 Players of 2018. It is the highest Top 100 debut ranking in the history of the league.

Wentz missed the first two games in an effort to continue recovery from his ACL injury and Nick Foles remained as the starter. On September 17, Wentz was medically cleared and regained his starting quarterback role. In his 2018 debut, Wentz finished with 255 yards, a touchdown, and an interception in the Eagles' 20–16 victory over the Indianapolis Colts in Week 3. The Eagles experienced mixed results with Wentz as starter.

In November 2018, with the Eagles sitting at 5–6 on the season, an anonymous Eagles player revealed to Josina Anderson that he believed Wentz was negatively impacting the team. The source stated that Wentz was over-targeting tight end Zach Ertz (who set an NFL record for receptions by a tight end that season), which was detrimental to the offense's rhythm.

Near the end of the season, Wentz dealt with a back injury and the Eagles, not wanting to risk further injury, decided to shut him down for the season and put in Foles as the starter for the rest of the season. Wentz finished with a 5–6 record and passed for 3,074 yards, 21 touchdowns, and seven interceptions. Foles, playing in Wentz's absence, went 3–0 and led the Eagles to a playoff victory. Wentz was ranked 96th by his fellow players on the NFL Top 100 Players of 2019.

Following the conclusion of the 2018 season, Joseph Santoliquito, writing in PhillyVoice, ran a piece in which more than a half dozen Eagles players were anonymously interviewed. The story revealed how players found Wentz to be "selfish" and "egotistical". The players stated that Wentz often called unnecessary audibles on plays and was not open to coaching. However, several of Wentz's current and former Eagles teammates, including Ertz, Fletcher Cox, Brandon Brooks, Lane Johnson, Torrey Smith and Nate Sudfeld, refuted the report and came to Wentz's defense as a teammate and a leader. They also stated that he always put the team first and that the locker room stood behind him.

==== 2019 season ====
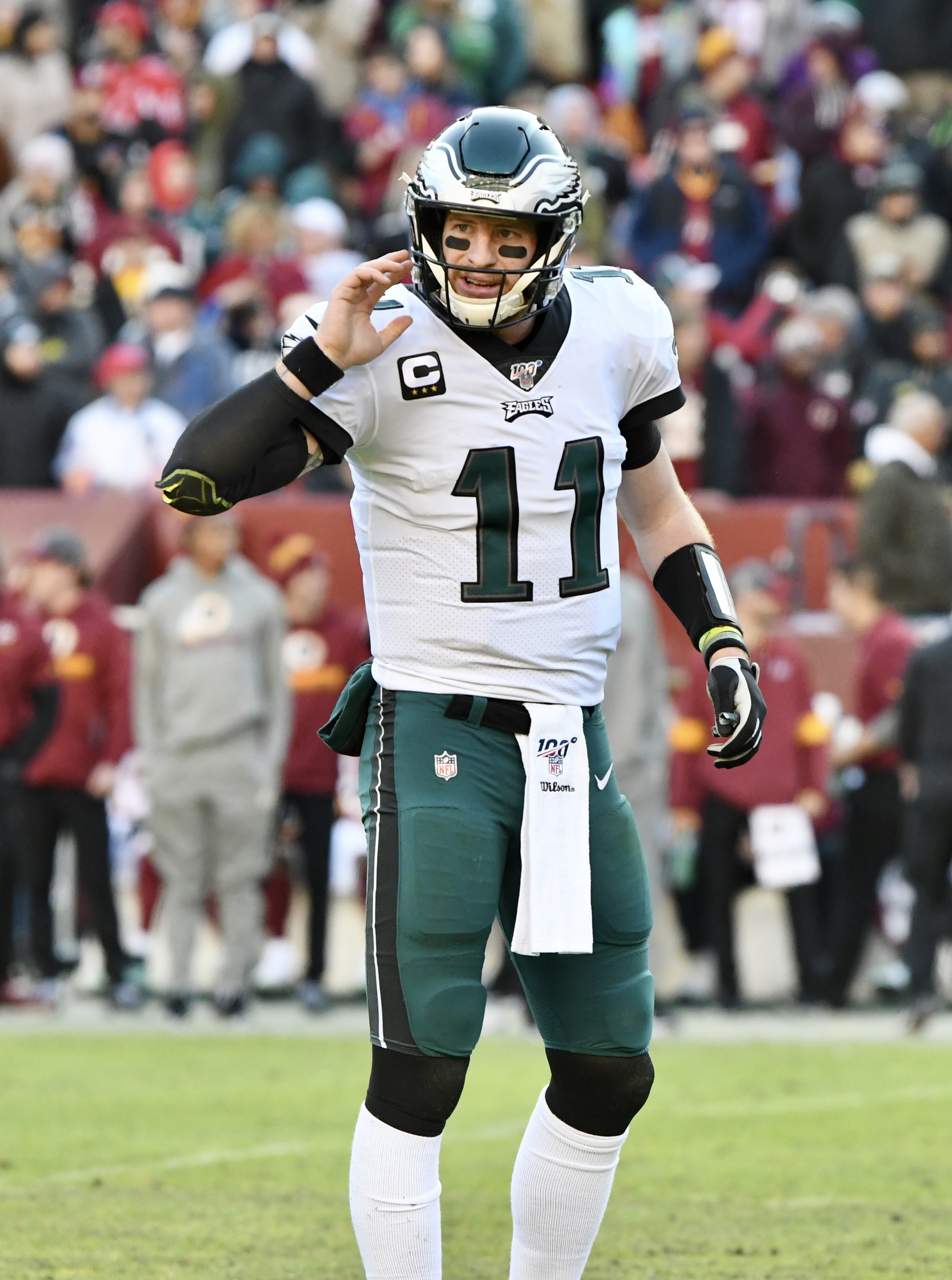
Wentz in 2019

On April 29, 2019, the Eagles exercised the fifth-year option on Wentz's contract. On June 6, they signed him to a four-year, $128 million contract extension with $107 million guaranteed, keeping Wentz under contract through the 2024 season.

In Week 1 against the Washington Redskins, Wentz threw for 313 yards and three touchdowns as the Eagles won 32–27. In Week 4, against the Green Bay Packers, he helped lead the Eagles to a 34–27 victory with three passing touchdowns.

Following a slow start at 3–3, another report came out, containing information from an anonymous Eagles player, who was critical of Wentz. The source said that Wentz was trying to do too much and was often looking for a big play rather than taking the short check down. At the time of the report, Wentz only had a completion percentage of 38% on passes that traveled 15 yards in the air and had three interceptions on passes of that variety, which was tied for most in the league.

In Week 13 against the Miami Dolphins, Wentz threw for 310 yards, three touchdowns, and one interception in the 37–31 loss. In Week 14, against the New York Giants, Wentz helped lead a comeback victory with 325 passing yards and two touchdowns in the 23–17 overtime win. In Week 15 against the Redskins, Wentz threw for 266 yards and three touchdowns during another comeback victory as the Eagles won 37–27. In Week 16 against the Dallas Cowboys, Wentz threw for 319 yards and a touchdown during the 17–9 victory. He helped lead the Eagles to a crucial 34–17 victory over the Giants in Week 17. Wentz had 289 yards and a touchdown in the victory, which gave the Eagles the NFC East title. The division title was his second in the Pederson/Wentz era. Wentz finished the 2019 season with 4,039 passing yards, 27 touchdowns, and seven interceptions. He became the first quarterback in franchise history to pass for at least 4,000 yards and the first in the NFL to do so without any receiver catching at least 500 yards.

In the NFC Wild Card Round against the Seattle Seahawks, Wentz left the game with a head injury in the first quarter after defensive end Jadeveon Clowney made a helmet to helmet hit on him. He was ruled out of the game with a concussion after playing just nine snaps in his post-season debut. Backup quarterback Josh McCown played the remainder of the Eagles' 17–9 loss.

==== 2020 season ====
Wentz made his return from injury in Week 1 against the Washington Football Team. During the game, Wentz threw for 270 yards, two touchdowns, and two interceptions as the Eagles lost 27–17. In the second quarter, the Eagles had a 17–0 lead over Washington, but they never managed to score for the rest of the game. In the next game against the Los Angeles Rams, Wentz continued to struggle, throwing for 242 yards and two interceptions during the 37–19 loss. The following week against the Cincinnati Bengals, Wentz threw two more interceptions in the 23–23 tie. In Week 7, against the New York Giants, he had 359 passing yards, two passing touchdowns, a rushing touchdown, and an interception during the narrow 22–21 victory. In Week 8 against the Dallas Cowboys, Wentz struggled, throwing for 123 yards, two touchdowns, and two interceptions during a 23–9 victory. In Week 11, Wentz went 21 for 35 throwing against the Cleveland Browns for 235 yards, two touchdowns, and two interceptions, one being a pick-six in the 22–17 road loss. In Week 13 against the Green Bay Packers, Wentz was benched in the third quarter for Jalen Hurts after the Eagles were trailing 20–3. Without Wentz, the Eagles went on to lose on the road 16–30. On December 8, the Eagles named Hurts the starting quarterback for their Week 14 matchup against the New Orleans Saints.

At the time of his benching, Wentz scored 21 total touchdowns (16 passing, 5 rushing). However, he led the league in interceptions thrown (15), total turnovers (19), and sacks taken (50). Wentz ended up leading the league in all of those categories at the end of the season despite only playing in 12 games.

=== Indianapolis Colts ===
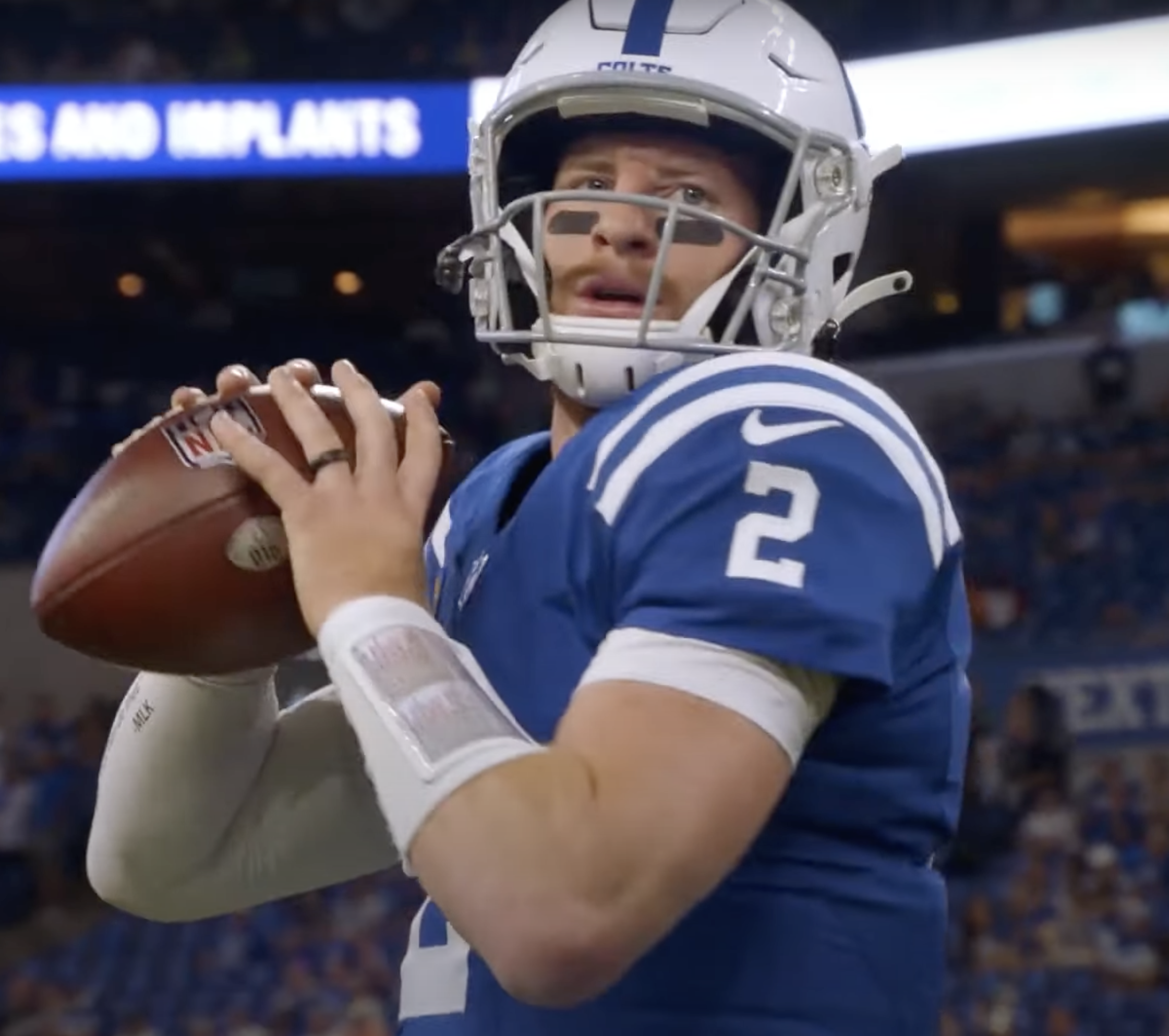
Wentz in 2021

Wentz was traded to the Indianapolis Colts on March 17, 2021, in exchange for a 2021 third-round pick and a 2022 first-round pick. He was reunited with former Philadelphia Eagles offensive coordinator Frank Reich, who had since become the head coach of the Colts.

During training camp, Wentz suffered a foot injury that required surgery. Despite the foot surgery, he was able to return in time for the September 12 season opener at home against the Seattle Seahawks, where Wentz completed 25-of-38 passes for 251 yards and two touchdowns; however, the Colts fell short 28–16 in his Indianapolis debut. Wentz passed for a season-high 402 yards and two touchdowns in a 31–25 overtime road loss to the Baltimore Ravens in Week 5.

Wentz threw for 3,563 yards, 27 touchdowns, and seven interceptions as the Colts finished the season 9–8, but failed to qualify for the playoffs after a loss in Week 18 to the Jacksonville Jaguars.

=== Washington Commanders ===
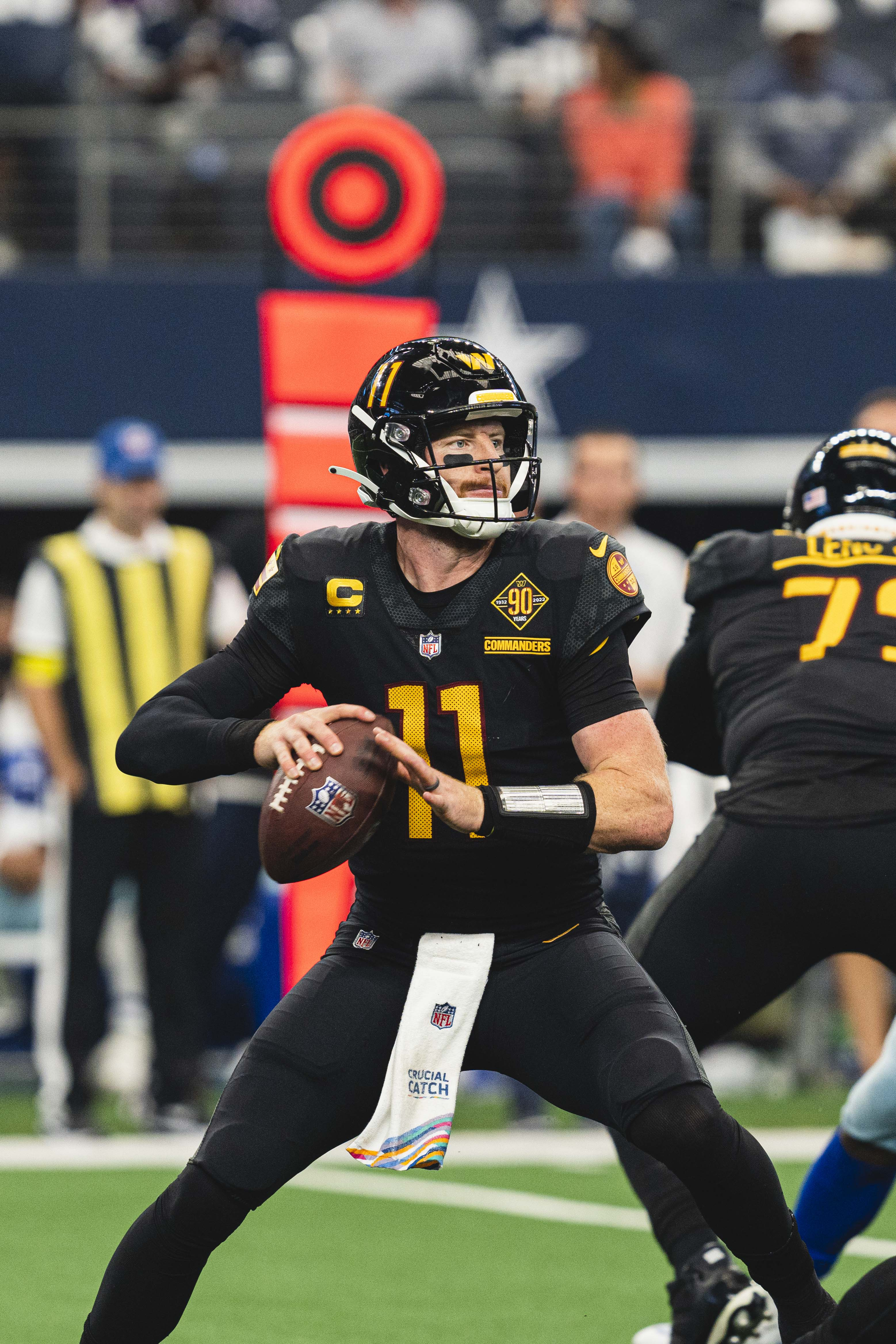
Wentz in 2022

Wentz, along with the Colts' second and seventh round picks in the 2022 NFL draft, were traded to the Washington Commanders on March 16, 2022, in exchange for 2022 second and third round picks and a conditional third-round pick in the 2023 NFL draft. In his debut with the Commanders, Wentz threw for 313 yards with four touchdowns and two interceptions in a 28–22 victory over the Jaguars.

In Week 3, Wentz made his return against his former team, the Philadelphia Eagles. Wentz completed 58% of his passes for 211 yards and was sacked nine times and fumbled twice during the 24–8 home loss. In the 21–17 loss to the Tennessee Titans in Week 5, Wentz threw a game-sealing interception to linebacker David Long Jr. in the red zone. In the win over the Chicago Bears, Wentz fractured his ring finger on his throwing hand. Wentz was placed on injured reserve on October 22 and re-activated on December 12, although he did not regain his starting duties due to the emergence of Taylor Heinicke as the team's starter.

In Week 16, Wentz came in relief of Heinicke after he was benched in the fourth quarter, where he completed 12 passes for 123 yards and a touchdown in the 37–20 road loss to the San Francisco 49ers. With the Commanders needing to win their final two games to make the playoffs, head coach Ron Rivera reinstated Wentz as the team's starting quarterback in Week 17. He had a poor performance against the Browns completing 16 of 28 passes for 143 yards, one rushing touchdown, and three interceptions during the 24–10 loss. The loss and wins by the Green Bay Packers and Detroit Lions on the same day resulted in the Commanders being eliminated from playoff contention.

On February 27, 2023, the Commanders released Wentz after one season with the team.

=== Los Angeles Rams ===
On November 8, 2023, Wentz signed with the Los Angeles Rams to be the backup to Matthew Stafford. He was announced as the starter for the Rams' final regular season game against the 49ers after the team secured a playoff berth the previous week. In the game, Wentz threw 17-for-24 for 176 yards, two touchdowns, and an interception. He also rushed for a 12-yard touchdown with 2:53 left in the fourth quarter, then completed a crucial two-point conversion to Tutu Atwell to help lead the Rams to a narrow 21–20 road victory over the eventual NFC champion San Francisco 49ers.

=== Kansas City Chiefs ===
On April 2, 2024, Wentz signed with the Kansas City Chiefs to be the backup to Patrick Mahomes.

In Week 15 against the Cleveland Browns, Wentz replaced an injured Mahomes midway through the fourth quarter in a 21–7 victory. With the number one seed in the AFC secured, Wentz was named the starter for the Chiefs' regular season finale against the Denver Broncos. In the matchup, Wentz completed 10-of-17 passes for 98 yards and no touchdowns as the Chiefs were shut out in a 38–0 loss. The Chiefs were able to reach Super Bowl LIX but lost 40–22 to Wentz's former team, the Eagles.

=== Minnesota Vikings ===
On August 24, 2025, Wentz signed with the Minnesota Vikings as a backup to J. J. McCarthy. On September 15, it was announced that Wentz would start for the Vikings in their Week 3 game against the Cincinnati Bengals. He is the first quarterback to start for six different teams in six consecutive seasons. Wentz was injured during the team's matchup with the Cleveland Browns, subsequently wearing a shoulder sleeve. He remained the starter for the next two games. During a Thursday Night Football matchup with the Los Angeles Chargers, Wentz suffered a season-ending shoulder injury. At the time he had completed 15-of-27 passes and a touchdown in the game, with one interception. Wentz's season finished with a total of six touchdowns, five interceptions and 1,217 passing yards.

On March 19, 2026, Wentz re-signed with the Vikings on a one-year, $3 million contract. He would come in the game week one against Green Bay due to a Kyler Murray concussion before being named the starter for the following week. Wentz would return to the backup role the next week and would return to action in week nine, where he was once again named the starter after Murray sustained a hamstring injury. However, after a poor performance where he went 8-25 and threw for two interceptions against Buffalo, the Vikings traded for Kirk Cousins, benching Wentz.

== Career statistics ==
=== NFL ===
Legend
	Won the Super Bowl
	Led the league
**Bold**	Career high

==== Regular season ====
Year	Team	Games			Passing									Rushing					Sacked		Fumbles	
Year	Team	GP	GS	Record	Cmp	Att	Pct	Yds	Y/A	Lng	TD	Int	Rtg	Att	Yds	Y/A	Lng	TD	Sck	SckY	Fum	Lost
2016	PHI	16	16	7–9	379	**607**	62.4	3,782	6.2	73	16	14	79.3	46	150	3.3	17	2	33	213	14	3
2017	PHI	13	13	**11–2**	265	440	60.2	3,296	7.5	72	**33**	7	101.9	**64**	**299**	4.7	24	0	28	162	9	3
2018	PHI	11	11	5–6	279	401	69.6	3,074	**7.7**	58	21	7	**102.2**	34	93	2.7	13	0	31	202	9	6
2019	PHI	16	16	9–7	**388**	**607**	63.9	**4,039**	6.7	53	27	7	93.1	62	243	3.9	19	1	37	230	**16**	**7**
2020	PHI	12	12	3–8–1	251	437	57.4	2,620	6.0	59	16	**15**	72.8	52	276	**5.3**	**40**	**5**	**50**	**326**	10	4
2021	IND	17	17	9–8	322	516	62.4	3,563	6.9	76	27	7	94.6	57	215	3.8	18	1	32	227	8	5
2022	WAS	8	7	2–5	172	276	62.3	1,755	6.4	75	11	9	80.2	22	86	3.9	18	1	26	159	6	1
2023	LAR	2	1	1–0	17	24	**70.8**	163	6.8	29	2	1	99.8	17	56	3.3	12	1	2	14	0	0
2024	KC	3	1	0–1	12	19	63.2	118	6.2	25	0	0	80.6	3	0	0.0	0	0	4	22	0	0
2025	MIN	5	5	2–3	110	169	65.1	1,216	7.2	**81**	6	5	85.8	11	57	5.2	16	0	19	125	3	0
2026	MIN	3	2	1–1	31	64	48.4	357	5.6	39	3	2	68.3	9	5	0.6	4	0	7	41	2	0
Career		106	101	50–50–1	2,226	3,560	62.5	23,983	6.7	81	162	74	88.8	377	1,480	3.9	40	11	269	1,721	77	29

==== Postseason ====
Year	Team	Games			Passing									Rushing					Sacked		Fumbles	
Year	Team	GP	GS	Record	Cmp	Att	Pct	Yds	Y/A	Lng	TD	Int	Rtg	Att	Yds	Y/A	Lng	TD	Sck	SckY	Fum	Lost
2017	PHI	Did not play due to injury																				
2018	PHI	Did not play due to injury																				
2019	PHI	1	1	0–1	1	4	25.0	3	0.8	3	0	0	39.6	0	0	—	0	0	1	1	1	0
2023	LAR	Did not play																				
2024	KC	Did not play																				
Career		1	1	0–1	1	4	25.0	3	0.8	3	0	0	39.6	0	0	0.0	0	0	1	1	1	0

=== College ===
Season	Team	Passing								Rushing			
Season	Team	Cmp	Att	Pct	Yds	Avg	TD	Int	Rtg	Att	Yds	Avg	TD
2011	North Dakota State	Redshirt											
2012	North Dakota State	12	16	75.0	144	9.0	2	0	191.9	5	22	4.4	1
2013	North Dakota State	22	30	73.3	209	7.0	1	0	142.9	10	70	7.0	0
2014	North Dakota State	228	358	63.7	3,111	8.7	25	10	154.1	138	642	4.7	6
2015	North Dakota State	130	208	62.5	1,651	7.9	17	4	152.3	63	294	4.7	6
Career		392	612	64.1	5,115	8.4	45	14	153.9	216	1,028	4.8	13

== Career highlights ==
=== Awards and honors ===
NFL

- Super Bowl champion (LII)
- Second-team All-Pro (2017)
- Pro Bowl – 2017
- Bert Bell Award (2017)
- FedEx Air Player of the Year (2017)
- 2× NFL Top 100 — 3rd (2018), 96th (2019)
- NFC Offensive Player of the Month – October 2017
- NFL Offensive Rookie of the Month – September 2016
- 2× NFC Offensive Player of the Week (Week 3, 2016; Week 7, 2017)
- 3× Pepsi NFL Rookie of the Week – Weeks 1, 3, and 5, 2016
- Total quarterback rating leader: (2017)

College

- 5× FCS national champion (2011–2015)

=== Eagles franchise records ===
- Passing yards in a season: 4,039 (2019)
- Passing touchdowns in a season: 33 (2017)
- Pass completions in a season: 388 (2019)
- Pass attempts in a season: 607 (2016 & 2019)

== Personal life ==
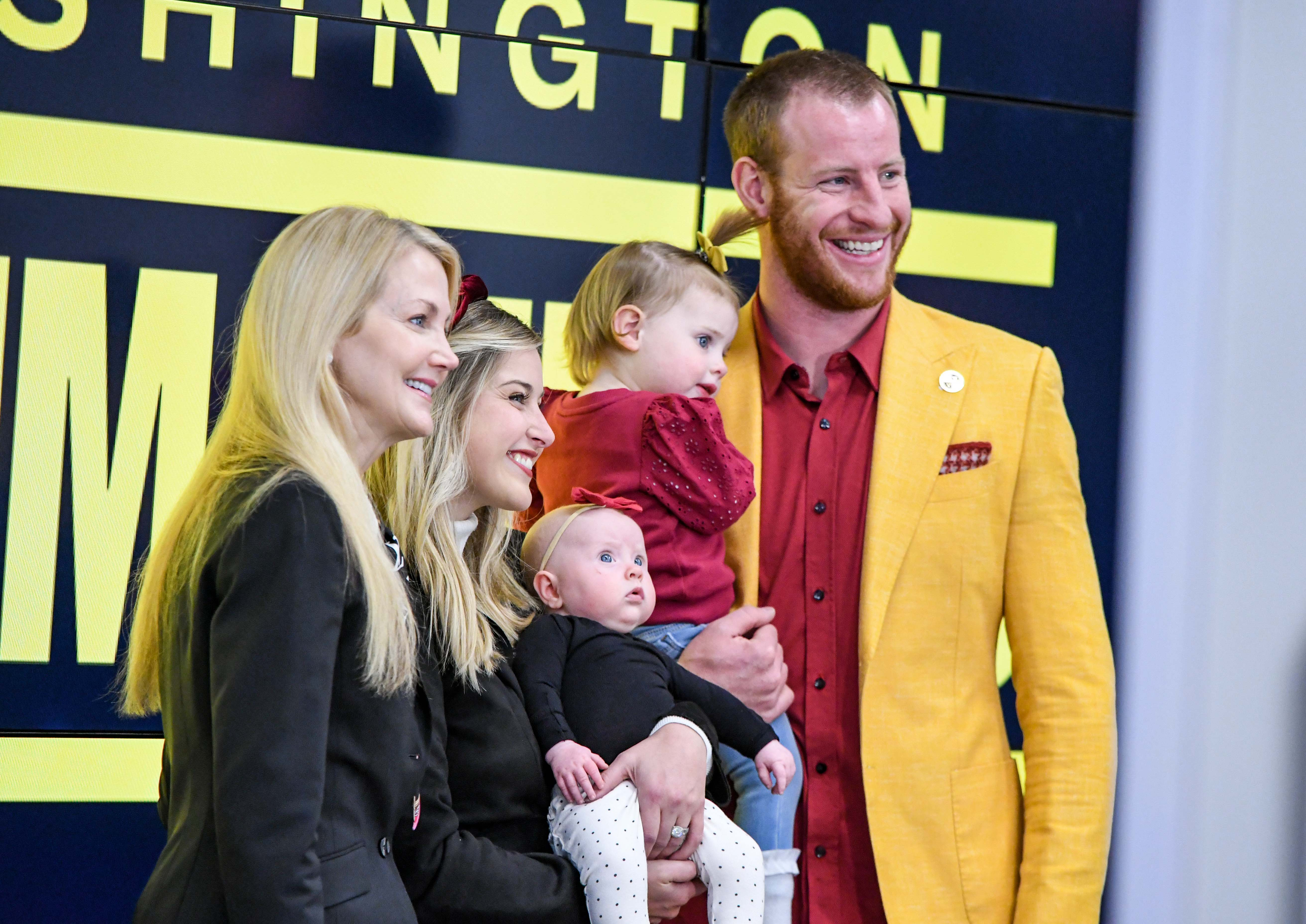
Wentz with his wife, children, and Tanya Snyder in March 2022

Wentz has been married since 2018 and has four daughters.

Wentz is a Christian. He founded the AO1 Foundation in 2017. In 2018, Wentz helped build a sports complex in Haiti. He is an avid hunter and frequently returns to North Dakota to hunt.

Wentz's older brother, Zach, played college baseball, pitching for the North Dakota State Bison team from 2009 to 2012. After a brief stint with the Fargo-Moorhead RedHawks, he went into teaching, before heading the AO1 Foundation, alongside former Bison quarterback Cole Davis. Wentz's younger half-brother, Luke Domres, played both baseball and football at high school level, but chose to concentrate on his studies, graduating magna cum laude from Arizona State University.
