= 2015 Southern Illinois Salukis football team =

American college football season

2015 Southern Illinois Salukis football
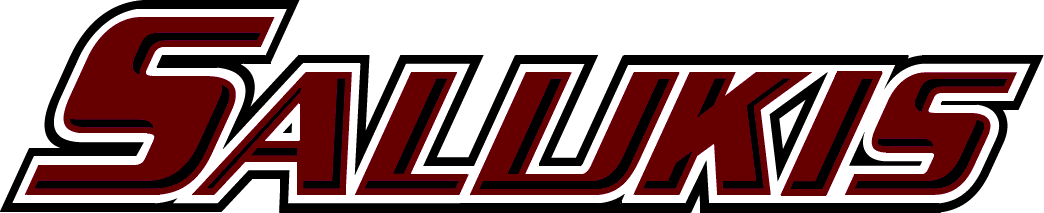
- Conference: Missouri Valley Football Conference
- Record: 3–8 (2–6 MVFC)
- Head coach: Dale Lennon (8th season)
- Co-offensive coordinators: Nick Hill (2nd season); Bill O'Boyle (2nd season)
- Defensive coordinator: David Elson (1st season)
- Home stadium: Saluki Stadium

2015 Missouri Valley Football Conference standings
	Conf.			Overall
Team	W		L	W		L
No. 1 North Dakota State +^	7	–	1	13	–	2
No. 5 Illinois State +^	7	–	1	10	–	3
No. 8 Northern Iowa ^	5	–	3	9	–	5
No. 15 South Dakota State ^	5	–	3	8	–	4
Western Illinois ^	5	–	3	7	–	6
Indiana State	3	–	5	5	–	6
Youngstown State	3	–	5	5	–	6
South Dakota	3	–	5	5	–	6
Southern Illinois	2	–	6	3	–	8
Missouri State	0	–	8	1	–	10
+ – Conference co-champions; ^ – FCS playoff participant; Rankings from STATS Poll

The 2015 Southern Illinois Salukis football team represented Southern Illinois University Carbondale as a member of the Missouri Valley Football Conference (MVFC) during the 2015 NCAA Division I FCS football season. Led by Dale Lennon in his eighth and final season as head coach, the Salukis compiled an overall record of 3–8 with a mark of 2–6 in conference play, placing ninth in the MVFC. Southern Illinois played home games at Saluki Stadium in Carbondale, Illinois.

On November 30, head coach Lennon was fired. He finished his tenure at Southern Illinois with an eight-year record of 51–42.

== Schedule ==
Date	Time	Opponent	Site	TV	Result	Attendance
September 5	3:00 pm	at Indiana*	Memorial Stadium; Bloomington, IN	ESPNews	L 47–48	36,071
September 12	6:00 pm	at Southeast Missouri State*	Houck Stadium; Cape Girardeau, MO		L 24–27	8,015
September 26	6:00 pm	No. 10 Liberty*	Saluki Stadium; Carbondale, IL	ESPN3	W 34–13	11,886
October 3	3:00 pm	at Western Illinois	Hanson Field; Macomb, IL	ESPN3	L 36–37	7,125
October 10	6:00 pm	Missouri State	Saluki Stadium; Carbondale, IL	ESPN3	W 73–26	5,509
October 17	2:05 pm	at No. 21 Indiana State	Memorial Stadium; Terre Haute, IN	ESPN3	L 36–39	7,421
October 24	6:00 pm	No. 16 Youngstown State^{†}	Saluki Stadium; Carbondale, IL	ESPN3	W 38–31 ^{OT}	8,459
October 31	2:00 pm	No. 7 North Dakota State	Saluki Stadium; Carbondale, IL	ESPN3	L 29–35	6,508
November 7	1:00 pm	at South Dakota	DakotaDome; Vermillion, SD	ESPN3	L 31–34	8,012
November 14	2:00 pm	No. 6 Illinois State	Saluki Stadium; Carbondale, IL	MVC TV/ESPN3	L 21–42	6,388
November 21	4:00 pm	at No. 15 Northern Iowa	UNI-Dome; Cedar Falls, IA	MVC TV/ESPN3	L 28–49	9,915
*Non-conference game; ^{†}Homecoming; Rankings from STATS Poll released prior to the game; All times are in Central time

== Game summaries ==
=== At Indiana ===
	1	2	3	4	Total
Salukis	11	21	0	15	47
Hoosiers	7	14	17	10	48

=== At Southeast Missouri State ===
	1	2	3	4	Total
Salukis	7	14	3	0	24
Redhawks	17	7	0	3	27

=== Liberty ===
	1	2	3	4	Total
#10 Flames	3	3	0	7	13
Salukis	3	17	7	7	34

=== At Western Illinois ===
	1	2	3	4	Total
Salukis	0	20	7	9	36
Leathernecks	7	7	14	9	37

=== Missouri State ===
	1	2	3	4	Total
Bears	3	13	7	3	26
Salukis	21	17	21	14	73

=== At Indiana State ===
	1	2	3	4	Total
Salukis	7	7	7	15	36
#21 Sycamores	7	10	10	12	39

=== Youngstown State ===
	1	2	3	4	OT	Total
#16 Penguins	0	14	14	3	0	31
Salukis	0	7	13	11	7	38

=== North Dakota State ===
	1	2	3	4	Total
#7 Bison	7	7	7	14	35
Salukis	3	7	9	10	29

=== At South Dakota ===
	1	2	3	4	Total
Salukis	7	14	7	3	31
Coyotes	7	13	7	7	34

=== Illinois State ===
	1	2	3	4	Total
#6 Redbirds	0	14	21	7	42
Salukis	0	21	0	0	21

=== At Northern Iowa ===
	1	2	3	4	Total
Salukis	0	14	14	0	28
#15 Panthers	14	14	14	7	49
