= 2015 South Dakota State Jackrabbits football team =

American college football season

2015 South Dakota State Jackrabbits football

NCAA Division I First Round, L 17–24 vs. Montana
- Conference: Missouri Valley Football Conference

Ranking
- STATS: No. 15
- FCS Coaches: No. 16
- Record: 8–4 (5–3 MVFC)
- Head coach: John Stiegelmeier (19th season)
- Offensive coordinator: Eric Eidsness (10th season)
- Defensive coordinator: Clint Brown (7th season)
- Home stadium: Coughlin–Alumni Stadium

2015 Missouri Valley Football Conference standings
| | Conf. | | | Overall |
| Team | W | | L | W | | L |
|---|---|---|---|---|---|---|
| No. 1 North Dakota State +^ | 7 | – | 1 | 13 | – | 2 |
| No. 5 Illinois State +^ | 7 | – | 1 | 10 | – | 3 |
| No. 8 Northern Iowa ^ | 5 | – | 3 | 9 | – | 5 |
| No. 15 South Dakota State ^ | 5 | – | 3 | 8 | – | 4 |
| Western Illinois ^ | 5 | – | 3 | 7 | – | 6 |
| Indiana State | 3 | – | 5 | 5 | – | 6 |
| Youngstown State | 3 | – | 5 | 5 | – | 6 |
| South Dakota | 3 | – | 5 | 5 | – | 6 |
| Southern Illinois | 2 | – | 6 | 3 | – | 8 |
| Missouri State | 0 | – | 8 | 1 | – | 10 |
+ – Conference co-champions; ^ – FCS playoff participant; Rankings from STATS Poll

The 2015 South Dakota State Jackrabbits football team represented South Dakota State University as a member of the Missouri Valley Football Conference (MVFC) during the 2015 NCAA Division I FCS football season. Led by 19th-year head coach John Stiegelmeier, the Jackrabbits compiled an overall record of 8–4 with a mark of 5–3 in conference play, placing in a three-way tie for third in the MVFC. South Dakota State received an at–large bid to the NCAA Division I Football Championship playoffs, where the Jackrabbits lost to Montana in the first round. The team played home games at Coughlin–Alumni Stadium in Brookings, South Dakota.

== Schedule ==
| Date | Time | Opponent | Rank | Site | TV | Result | Attendance |
|---|---|---|---|---|---|---|---|
| September 5 | 11:00 am | at Kansas* | No. 16 | Memorial Stadium; Lawrence, KS | FSN | W 41–38 | 30,144 |
| September 12 | 6:00 pm | Southern Utah* | No. 9 | Coughlin–Alumni Stadium; Brookings, SD | ESPN3 | W 55–10 | 13,423 |
| September 26 | 5:00 pm | Robert Morris* | No. 6 | Coughlin–Alumni Stadium; Brookings, SD | Midco/ESPN3 | W 34–10 | 12,153 |
| October 3 | 6:00 pm | No. 3 North Dakota State | No. 5 | Coughlin–Alumni Stadium; Brookings, SD (Dakota Marker) | Midco/ESPN3 | L 7–28 | 17,348 |
| October 10 | 6:00 pm | No. 19 Indiana State | No. 8 | Coughlin–Alumni Stadium; Brookings, SD | Midco/ESPN3 | W 24–7 | 9,347 |
| October 17 | 3:00 pm | at No. 11 Youngstown State | No. 7 | Stambaugh Stadium; Youngstown, OH | MVC TV/ESPN3 | W 38–8 | 14,974 |
| October 24 | 2:00 pm | No. 22 Northern Iowa | No. 6 | Coughlin–Alumni Stadium; Brookings, SD | Midco/ESPN3 | L 7–10 | 16,042 |
| October 31 | 2:00 pm | at Missouri State | No. 14 | Robert W. Plaster Stadium; Springfield, MO | MVC TV/ESPN3 | W 39–0 | 3,729 |
| November 7 | 2:00 pm | No. 2 Illinois State | No. 11 | Coughlin–Alumni Stadium; Brookings, SD | Midco/ESPN3 | W 25–20 | 9,081 |
| November 14 | 2:00 pm | at South Dakota | No. 5 | DakotaDome; Vermillion, SD (rivalry) | Midco/ESPN3 | W 30–23 | 10,345 |
| November 21 | 1:00 pm | at Western Illinois | No. 5 | Hanson Field; Macomb, IL | ESPN3 | L 24–30 ^{2OT} | 1,853 |
| November 28 | 2:00 pm | at No. 16 Montana* | No. 10 | Washington–Grizzly Stadium; Missoula, MT (NCAA Division I First Round) | ESPN3 | L 17–24 | 14,575 |
*Non-conference game; Rankings from STATS Poll released prior to the game; All times are in Central time

== Game summaries ==
=== At Kansas ===
| | 1 | 2 | 3 | 4 | Total |
|---|---|---|---|---|---|
| #16 Jackrabbits | 17 | 14 | 3 | 7 | 41 |
| Jayhawks | 7 | 7 | 14 | 10 | 38 |

=== Southern Utah ===
| | 1 | 2 | 3 | 4 | Total |
|---|---|---|---|---|---|
| Thunderbirds | 7 | 0 | 0 | 3 | 10 |
| #9 Jackrabbits | 3 | 24 | 7 | 21 | 55 |

=== Robert Morris ===
| | 1 | 2 | 3 | 4 | Total |
|---|---|---|---|---|---|
| Colonials | 0 | 10 | 0 | 0 | 10 |
| #6 Jackrabbits | 7 | 13 | 7 | 7 | 34 |

=== North Dakota State ===
| | 1 | 2 | 3 | 4 | Total |
|---|---|---|---|---|---|
| #3 Bison | 7 | 14 | 7 | 0 | 28 |
| #5 Jackrabbits | 0 | 0 | 7 | 0 | 7 |

=== Indiana State ===
| | 1 | 2 | 3 | 4 | Total |
|---|---|---|---|---|---|
| #19 Sycamores | 0 | 0 | 7 | 0 | 7 |
| #8 Jackrabbits | 0 | 14 | 0 | 10 | 24 |

=== At Youngstown State ===
| | 1 | 2 | 3 | 4 | Total |
|---|---|---|---|---|---|
| #7 Jackrabbbits | 7 | 10 | 7 | 14 | 38 |
| #11 Penguins | 2 | 3 | 3 | 0 | 8 |

=== Northern Iowa ===
| | 1 | 2 | 3 | 4 | Total |
|---|---|---|---|---|---|
| #22 Panthers | 0 | 3 | 7 | 0 | 10 |
| #6 Jackrabbits | 0 | 0 | 7 | 0 | 7 |

=== At Missouri State ===
| | 1 | 2 | 3 | 4 | Total |
|---|---|---|---|---|---|
| #14 Jackrabbits | 10 | 12 | 10 | 7 | 39 |
| Bears | 0 | 0 | 0 | 0 | 0 |

=== Illinois State ===
| | 1 | 2 | 3 | 4 | Total |
|---|---|---|---|---|---|
| #2 Redbirds | 7 | 0 | 7 | 6 | 20 |
| #11 Jackrabbits | 0 | 13 | 6 | 6 | 25 |

=== At South Dakota ===
| | 1 | 2 | 3 | 4 | Total |
|---|---|---|---|---|---|
| #5 Jackrabbits | 3 | 7 | 0 | 20 | 30 |
| Coyotes | 7 | 0 | 13 | 3 | 23 |

=== At Western Illinois ===
| | 1 | 2 | 3 | 4 | OT | 2OT | Total |
|---|---|---|---|---|---|---|---|
| #5 Jackrabbbits | 0 | 10 | 0 | 7 | 7 | 0 | 24 |
| Leathernecks | 3 | 0 | 7 | 7 | 7 | 6 | 30 |

== FCS playoffs ==
=== First round – at Montana ===
| | 1 | 2 | 3 | 4 | Total |
|---|---|---|---|---|---|
| #10 Jackrabbits | 0 | 0 | 10 | 7 | 17 |
| #16 Grizzlies | 7 | 17 | 0 | 0 | 24 |

== Ranking movements ==
Ranking movements Legend: ██ Increase in ranking ██ Decrease in ranking т = Tied with team above or below ( ) = First-place votes
| | Week | | | | | | | | | | | | | |
| Poll | Pre | 1 | 2 | 3 | 4 | 5 | 6 | 7 | 8 | 9 | 10 | 11 | 12 | Final |
|---|---|---|---|---|---|---|---|---|---|---|---|---|---|---|
| STATS FCS | 16 | 9 (8) | 7 (8) | 6 (6) | 5 (6) | 8 | 7 | 6 | 14 | 11 | 5 | 5 | 10–T | 15 |
| Coaches | 15 | 10 (1) | 8 (2) | 7 (1) | 7 (1) | 9 | 7 | 6 | 13 | 11 | 5 | 5 | 12 | 16 |
