= 2015 Missouri State Bears football team =

American college football season

2015 Missouri State Bears football
- Conference: Missouri Valley Football Conference
- Record: 1–10 (0–8 MVFC)
- Head coach: Dave Steckel (1st season)
- Offensive coordinator: Mario Verduzco (1st season)
- Offensive scheme: Spread
- Defensive coordinator: Marcus Yokeley (1st season)
- Base defense: 4–3
- Captains: James Barnes; Eric Christophel; Dylan Cole
- Home stadium: Robert W. Plaster Stadium

2015 Missouri Valley Football Conference standings
	Conf.			Overall
Team	W		L	W		L
No. 1 North Dakota State +^	7	–	1	13	–	2
No. 5 Illinois State +^	7	–	1	10	–	3
No. 8 Northern Iowa ^	5	–	3	9	–	5
No. 15 South Dakota State ^	5	–	3	8	–	4
Western Illinois ^	5	–	3	7	–	6
Indiana State	3	–	5	5	–	6
Youngstown State	3	–	5	5	–	6
South Dakota	3	–	5	5	–	6
Southern Illinois	2	–	6	3	–	8
Missouri State	0	–	8	1	–	10
+ – Conference co-champions; ^ – FCS playoff participant; Rankings from STATS Poll

The 2015 Missouri State Bears football team represented Missouri State University as a member of the Missouri Valley Football Conference (MVFC) during the 2015 NCAA Division I FCS football season. Led by first-year head coach Dave Steckel, the Bears compiled an overall record of 1–10 with a mark of 0–8 in conference play, placing last out of ten teams in the MVFC. Missouri State played home games at Robert W. Plaster Stadium in Springfield, Missouri.

== Schedule ==
Date	Time	Opponent	Site	TV	Result	Attendance
September 5	6:00 pm	at Memphis*	Liberty Bowl Memorial Stadium; Memphis, TN	ESPN3	L 7–63	41,730
September 12	2:00 pm	Chadron State*	Robert W. Plaster Stadium; Springfield, MO	ESPN3	W 21–13	17,835
September 19	6:00 pm	at Arkansas State*	Centennial Bank Stadium; Jonesboro, AR	ESPN3	L 7–70	26,634
October 3	2:00 pm	No. 21 Indiana State	Robert W. Plaster Stadium; Springfield, MO	ESPN3	L 28–56	9,183
October 10	6:00 pm	at Southern Illinois	Saluki Stadium; Carbondale, IL	ESPN3	L 26–73	5,509
October 17	2:00 pm	No. 4 Illinois State^{†}	Robert W. Plaster Stadium; Springfield, MO	ESPN3	L 2–38	14,212
October 24	2:00 pm	at South Dakota	DakotaDome; Vermillion, SD	ESPN3	L 10–40	8,723
October 31	2:00 pm	No. 14 South Dakota State	Robert W. Plaster Stadium; Springfield, MO	MVC TV/ESPN3	L 0–39	3,729
November 7	1:00 pm	at No. 21 Youngstown State	Stambaugh Stadium; Youngstown, OH	MVC TV/ESPN3	L 7–47	11,077
November 14	2:00 pm	No. 17 Northern Iowa	Robert W. Plaster Stadium; Springfield, MO	ESPN3	L 0–41	5,223
November 21	2:30 pm	at No. 2 North Dakota State	Fargodome; Fargo, ND	ESPN3	L 0–55	18,624
*Non-conference game; ^{†}Homecoming; Rankings from STATS Poll released prior to the game; All times are in Central time
