= 2015 Western Illinois Leathernecks football team =

American college football season

2015 Western Illinois Leathernecks football

NCAA Division I Second Round, L 19–36 vs. Illinois State
- Conference: Missouri Valley Football Conference
- Record: 7–6 (5–3 MVFC)
- Head coach: Bob Nielson (3rd season)
- Defensive coordinator: Brian Mohnsen (1st season)
- Home stadium: Hanson Field

2015 Missouri Valley Football Conference standings
	Conf.			Overall
Team	W		L	W		L
No. 1 North Dakota State +^	7	–	1	13	–	2
No. 5 Illinois State +^	7	–	1	10	–	3
No. 8 Northern Iowa ^	5	–	3	9	–	5
No. 15 South Dakota State ^	5	–	3	8	–	4
Western Illinois ^	5	–	3	7	–	6
Indiana State	3	–	5	5	–	6
Youngstown State	3	–	5	5	–	6
South Dakota	3	–	5	5	–	6
Southern Illinois	2	–	6	3	–	8
Missouri State	0	–	8	1	–	10
+ – Conference co-champions; ^ – FCS playoff participant; Rankings from STATS Poll

The 2015 Western Illinois Leathernecks football team represented Western Illinois University as a member of the Missouri Valley Football Conference (MVFC) during the 2015 NCAA Division I FCS football season. Led by Bob Nielson in his third and final season as head coach, the Leathernecks compiled an overall record of 7–6 overall with mark of 5–3 in conference play, placing in a three-way tie for third in the MVFC. Western Illinois received an at-large bid to NCAA Division I Football Championship playoffs, where the Leathernecks defeated Dayton in the first round before losing to fellow MVFC member Illinois State in the second round. The team played home games at Hanson Field in Macomb, Illinois.

On December 14, Nielson resigned to become the head coach at fellow MVFC member South Dakota. He finished his three-year tenure at Western Illinois with a record of 16–21.

== Schedule ==
Date	Time	Opponent	Rank	Site	TV	Result	Attendance
September 3	6:00 pm	Eastern Illinois*		Hanson Field; Macomb, IL	WIUtv3, ESPN3	W 33–5	5,985
September 12	11:00 am	at Illinois*		Memorial Stadium; Champaign, IL	BTN	L 0–44	37,733
September 19	5:00 pm	at No. 2 Coastal Carolina*		Brooks Stadium; Conway, SC	BSN	L 27–34	10,311
October 3	3:00 pm	Southern Illinois^{†}		Hanson Field; Macomb, IL	WIUtv3/ESPN3	W 37–36	7,125
October 10	3:00 pm	South Dakota		Hanson Field; Macomb, IL	MVC TV, WIUtv3, ESPN3	W 40–21	6,298
October 17	4:00 pm	at No. 12 Northern Iowa		UNI-Dome; Cedar Falls, IA	WIUtv3, ESPN3	W 24–19	16,324
October 24	2:00 pm	at No. 3 Illinois State	No. 20	Hancock Stadium; Normal, IL	ESPN3	L 28–48	13,391
October 31	1:00 pm	No. 25 Youngstown State	No. 23	Hanson Field; Macomb, IL	WIUtv3, ESPN3	L 21–23	2,610
November 7	2:30 pm	at No. 6 North Dakota State		Fargodome; Fargo, ND	WIUtv3-TD, ESPN3	L 7–59	18,251
November 14	12:05 pm	at Indiana State		Memorial Stadium; Terre Haute, IN	WIUtv3-TD, ESPN3	W 37–30 ^{OT}	4,567
November 21	1:00 pm	No. 5 South Dakota State		Hanson Field; Macomb, IL	WIUtv3, ESPN3	W 30–24 ^{2OT}	1,853
November 28	11:00 am	at Dayton*		Welcome Stadium; Dayton, OH (NCAA Division I First Round)	ESPN3	W 24–7	997
December 5	1:00 pm	at No. 4 Illinois State*		Hancock Stadium; Normal, IL (NCAA Division I Second Round)	ESPN3	L 19–36	6,124
*Non-conference game; ^{†}Homecoming; Rankings from STATS Poll released prior to the game; All times are in Central time

== Ranking ==
Ranking movements Legend: ██ Increase in ranking ██ Decrease in ranking — = Not ranked RV = Received votes
	Week													
Poll	Pre	1	2	3	4	5	6	7	8	9	10	11	12	Final
STATS FCS	RV	RV	RV	RV	RV	RV	RV	20	23	RV	RV	RV	RV	22
Coaches	—	RV	RV	RV	RV	RV	RV	23	RV	RV	—	RV	RV	22
