= 2015 Indiana State Sycamores football team =

American college football season

2015 Indiana State Sycamores football
- Conference: Missouri Valley Football Conference
- Record: 5–6 (3–5 MVFC)
- Head coach: Mike Sanford Sr. (3rd season)
- Offensive coordinator: Brian Sheppard (3rd season)
- Defensive coordinator: Brian Cabral (3rd season)
- Home stadium: Memorial Stadium

2015 Missouri Valley Football Conference standings
	Conf.			Overall
Team	W		L	W		L
No. 1 North Dakota State +^	7	–	1	13	–	2
No. 5 Illinois State +^	7	–	1	10	–	3
No. 8 Northern Iowa ^	5	–	3	9	–	5
No. 15 South Dakota State ^	5	–	3	8	–	4
Western Illinois ^	5	–	3	7	–	6
Indiana State	3	–	5	5	–	6
Youngstown State	3	–	5	5	–	6
South Dakota	3	–	5	5	–	6
Southern Illinois	2	–	6	3	–	8
Missouri State	0	–	8	1	–	10
+ – Conference co-champions; ^ – FCS playoff participant; Rankings from STATS Poll

The 2015 Indiana State Sycamores football team represented Indiana State University as a member of the Missouri Valley Football Conference (MVFC) during the 2015 NCAA Division I FCS football season. Led by third-year head coach Mike Sanford Sr., the Sycamores compiled an overall record of 5–6 with a mark of 3–5 in conference play, placing in a three-way tie for sixth in the MVFC. Indiana State played home games at Memorial Stadium in Terre Haute, Indiana.

== Schedule ==
Date	Time	Opponent	Rank	Site	TV	Result	Attendance
September 5	3:05 pm	Butler*	No. 21	Memorial Stadium; Terre Haute, IN	ESPN3	W 52–17	3,941
September 12	12:00 pm	at Purdue*	No. 21	Ross–Ade Stadium; West Lafayette, IN	ESPNews	L 14–38	41,158
September 19	3:05 pm	Southeast Missouri State*	No. 23	Memorial Stadium; Terre Haute, IN	ESPN3	W 29–28	6,786
October 3	3:00 pm	at Missouri State	No. 21	Robert W. Plaster Stadium; Springfield, MO	ESPN3	W 56–28	9,183
October 10	7:00 pm	at No. 8 South Dakota State	No. 19	Coughlin–Alumni Stadium; Brookings, SD	ESPN3	L 7–24	9,347
October 17	3:05 pm	Southern Illinois^{†}	No. 21	Memorial Stadium; Terre Haute, IN	ESPN3	W 39–36	7,421
October 24	1:05 pm	No. 8 North Dakota State	No. 18	Memorial Stadium; Terre Haute, IN	MVC TV/ESPN3	L 14–28	6,524
October 31	1:00 pm	at No. 3 Illinois State	No. 21	Hancock Stadium; Normal, IL	ESPN3	L 24–27	7,498
November 7	7:00 pm	at No. 17 Northern Iowa	No. 23	UNI-Dome; Cedar Falls, IA	ESPN3	L 13–59	13,224
November 14	1:05 pm	Western Illinois		Memorial Stadium; Terre Haute, IN	ESPN3	L 30–37 ^{OT}	4,567
November 21	1:05 pm	Youngstown State		Memorial Stadium; Terre Haute, IN	ESPN3	W 27–24	1,121
*Non-conference game; ^{†}Homecoming; Rankings from STATS Poll released prior to the game; All times are in Eastern time

== Rankings ==
Ranking movements Legend: ██ Increase in ranking ██ Decrease in ranking — = Not ranked RV = Received votes
	Week													
Poll	Pre	1	2	3	4	5	6	7	8	9	10	11	12	Final
STATS FCS	21	21	23	22	21	19	21	18	21	23	RV	—	RV	
Coaches	20	21	25	23	24	21	RV	21	23	RV	RV	—	—	

== Game summaries ==
=== Butler ===
	1	2	3	4	Total
Bulldogs	0	10	7	0	17
#21 Sycamores	24	7	14	7	52

=== At Purdue ===
	1	2	3	4	Total
#21 Sycamores	0	7	7	0	14
Boilermakers	14	10	7	7	38

=== Southeast Missouri State ===
	1	2	3	4	Total
Redhawks	7	0	0	21	28
#23 Sycamores	0	0	21	8	29

=== At Missouri State ===
	1	2	3	4	Total
#21 Sycamores	7	14	14	21	56
Bears	7	7	7	7	28

=== At South Dakota State ===
	1	2	3	4	Total
#19 Sycamores	0	0	7	0	7
#8 Jackrabbits	0	14	0	10	24

=== Southern Illinois ===
	1	2	3	4	Total
Salukis	7	7	7	15	36
#21 Sycamores	7	10	10	12	39

=== North Dakota State ===
	1	2	3	4	Total
#8 Bison	7	7	14	0	28
#18 Sycamores	0	7	7	0	14

=== At Illinois State ===
	1	2	3	4	Total
#21 Sycamores	0	21	3	0	24
#3 Redbirds	2	7	7	11	27

=== At Northern Iowa ===
	1	2	3	4	Total
#23 Sycamores	0	0	13	0	13
#17 Panthers	10	28	7	14	59

=== Western Illinois ===
	1	2	3	4	OT	Total
Leathernecks	3	7	14	6	7	37
Sycamores	13	7	10	0	0	30

=== Youngstown State ===
	1	2	3	4	Total
Penguins	14	7	0	3	24
Sycamores	7	14	0	6	27
