= AO1 Foundation =

American non-profit foundation

- Formation: July 11, 2017; 8 years ago
- Founder: Carson Wentz
- Founded at: Philadelphia, Pennsylvania
- Region served: Worldwide; however primarily in Philadelphia and North Dakota regions
- Services: Activities for underprivileged youth; Hunting and outdoor opportunities for the physically disabled and veterans; Service dog support
- Website: www.ao1foundation.org

The Audience of One Foundation, commonly referred to as the AO1 Foundation, is an American non-profit foundation founded in July 2017 by then-Philadelphia Eagles quarterback Carson Wentz. The "audience of one" in the foundation's name refers to Jesus, as Wentz is a Christian. The foundation operates through 3 ministries.

== History ==
In 2018, the foundation partnered with The Connect Church to start operating a food truck in Philadelphia, providing free food. The service expanded to Indianapolis in 2021, when Wentz quarterbacked the Indianapolis Colts.

In the same year, the foundation created the Outdoor Ministry to give children with life-threatening illnesses access to activities such as swimming, fishing and hunting.

After visiting Haiti on a mission trip in the spring of 2017, Wentz partnered with Mission of Hope to build a sports complex.
