= 2015 Youngstown State Penguins football team =

American college football season

2015 Youngstown State Penguins football
- Conference: Missouri Valley Football Conference
- Record: 5–6 (3–5 MVFC)
- Head coach: Bo Pelini (1st season)
- Offensive coordinator: Shane Montgomery (6th season)
- Offensive scheme: Spread
- Defensive coordinator: Carl Pelini (1st season)
- Base defense: 4–3
- Home stadium: Stambaugh Stadium

2015 Missouri Valley Football Conference standings
	Conf.			Overall
Team	W		L	W		L
No. 1 North Dakota State +^	7	–	1	13	–	2
No. 5 Illinois State +^	7	–	1	10	–	3
No. 8 Northern Iowa ^	5	–	3	9	–	5
No. 15 South Dakota State ^	5	–	3	8	–	4
Western Illinois ^	5	–	3	7	–	6
Indiana State	3	–	5	5	–	6
Youngstown State	3	–	5	5	–	6
South Dakota	3	–	5	5	–	6
Southern Illinois	2	–	6	3	–	8
Missouri State	0	–	8	1	–	10
+ – Conference co-champions; ^ – FCS playoff participant; Rankings from STATS Poll

The 2015 Youngstown State Penguins football team represented Youngstown State University in the 2015 NCAA Division I FCS football season. They were led by first-year head coach Bo Pelini and played their home games at Stambaugh Stadium. They were a member of the Missouri Valley Football Conference. They finished the season 5–6, 3–5 in MVFC play to finish in a three-way tie for sixth place.

== Schedule ==
Date	Time	Opponent	Rank	Site	TV	Result	Attendance
September 5	1:00 pm	at Pittsburgh*	No. 14	Heinz Field; Pittsburgh, PA	ESPN3	L 37–45	49,969
September 12	7:00 pm	Robert Morris*	No. 17	Stambaugh Stadium; Youngstown, OH	ESPN3/MyYTV	W 21–14 ^{OT}	16,622
September 19	4:00 pm	Saint Francis (PA)*	No. 16	Stambaugh Stadium; Youngstown, OH	ESPN3/MyYTV	W 48–3	17,428
October 3	3:00 pm	at South Dakota	No. 10	DakotaDome; Vermillion, SD	ESPN3	W 31–3	10,015
October 10	7:00 pm	No. 4 Illinois State	No. 9	Stambaugh Stadium; Youngstown, OH	ESPN3/MyYTV	L 29–31	17,715
October 17	4:00 pm	No. 7 South Dakota State^{†}	No. 11	Stambaugh Stadium; Youngstown, OH	MVC TV/ESPN3	L 8–38	14,974
October 24	7:00 pm	at Southern Illinois	No. 16	Saluki Stadium; Carbondale, IL	ESPN3	L 31–38 ^{OT}	8,459
October 31	2:00 pm	at No. 23 Western Illinois	No. 25	Hanson Field; Macomb, IL	ESPN3	W 23–21	2,610
November 7	2:00 pm	Missouri State	No. 21	Stambaugh Stadium; Youngstown, OH	MVC TV/ESPN3	W 47–7	11,077
November 14	2:00 pm	No. 2 North Dakota State	No. 20	Stambaugh Stadium; Youngstown, OH	ESPN3/MyYTV	L 24–27	11,309
November 21	1:05 pm	at Indiana State		Memorial Stadium; Terre Haute, IN	ESPN3	L 24–27	1,121
*Non-conference game; ^{†}Homecoming; Rankings from STATS Poll released prior to the game; All times are in Eastern time

== Rankings ==
Ranking movements Legend: ██ Increase in ranking ██ Decrease in ranking — = Not ranked RV = Received votes т = Tied with team above or below
	Week													
Poll	Pre	1	2	3	4	5	6	7	8	9	10	11	12	Final
STATS FCS	14	17	16	13	10	9	11	16	25	21	20	RV	RV	—
Coaches	16	17	16	12	10	7	12	17	24–T	21	21	RV	—	—
