= 2015 Illinois State Redbirds football team =

American college football season

2015 Illinois State Redbirds football

MVFC co–champion

NCAA Division I Quarterfinal, L 27–39 vs. Richmond
- Conference: Missouri Valley Football Conference

Ranking
- STATS: No. 5
- FCS Coaches: No. 5
- Record: 10–3 (7–1 MVFC)
- Head coach: Brock Spack (7th season)
- Offensive coordinator: Kurt Beathard (2nd season)
- Defensive coordinator: Spence Nowinsky (2nd season)
- MVPs: Marshaun Coprich; Pat Meehan; Dalton Keene
- Captains: Tre Roberson; Pat Meehan; Soniel Estime
- Home stadium: Hancock Stadium

2015 Missouri Valley Football Conference standings
	Conf.			Overall
Team	W		L	W		L
No. 1 North Dakota State +^	7	–	1	13	–	2
No. 5 Illinois State +^	7	–	1	10	–	3
No. 8 Northern Iowa ^	5	–	3	9	–	5
No. 15 South Dakota State ^	5	–	3	8	–	4
Western Illinois ^	5	–	3	7	–	6
Indiana State	3	–	5	5	–	6
Youngstown State	3	–	5	5	–	6
South Dakota	3	–	5	5	–	6
Southern Illinois	2	–	6	3	–	8
Missouri State	0	–	8	1	–	10
+ – Conference co-champions; ^ – FCS playoff participant; Rankings from STATS Poll

The 2015 Illinois State Redbirds football team represented Illinois State University as a member of the Missouri Valley Football Conference (MVFC) during the 2015 NCAA Division I FCS football season. Led by seventh-year head coach Brock Spack, the Redbirds compiled an overall record of 10–3 with a mark of 7–1 in conference play, sharing the MVFC title with North Dakota State for the second consecutive season. Illinois State received an at-large bid to the NCAA Division I Football Championship playoffs. After a first-round bye, the Redbirds defeated Western Illinois in the second round, before losing to Richmond in the quarterfinals. The team played home games at Hancock Stadium in Normal, Illinois.

== Schedule ==
Date	Time	Opponent	Rank	Site	TV	Result	Attendance
September 5	11:00 am	at Iowa*	No. 2	Kinnick Stadium; Iowa City, IA	BTN	L 14–31	59,450
September 12	6:30 pm	Morgan State*	No. 4	Hancock Stadium; Normal, IL	CSN+/ESPN3	W 67–14	13,391
September 19	6:00 pm	at Eastern Illinois*	No. 5	O'Brien Stadium; Charleston, IL (Mid-America Classic)	WMBD	W 34–31 ^{OT}	8,104
October 3	12:00 pm	No. 7 Northern Iowa	No. 4	Hancock Stadium; Normal, IL	MVC TV/ESPN3	W 21–13	13,391
October 10	6:00 pm	at No. 9 Youngstown State	No. 4	Stambaugh Stadium; Youngstown, OH	ESPN3	W 31–29	17,715
October 17	2:00 pm	at Missouri State	No. 4	Robert W. Plaster Stadium; Springfield, MO	ESPN3	W 38–2	14,212
October 24	2:00 pm	No. 20 Western Illinois	No. 3	Hancock Stadium; Normal, IL	CSNC/ESPN3	W 48–28	13,391
October 31	12:00 pm	No. 21 Indiana State	No. 3	Hancock Stadium; Normal, IL	CSNC/ESPN3	W 27–24	7,498
November 7	2:00 pm	at No. 11 South Dakota State	No. 2	Coughlin–Alumni Stadium; Brookings, SD	ESPN3	L 20–25	9,081
November 14	2:00 pm	at Southern Illinois	No. 6	Saluki Stadium; Carbondale, IL	MVC TV/ESPN3	W 42–21	6,388
November 21	12:00 pm	South Dakota	No. 6	Hancock Stadium; Normal, IL	CSNC/ESPN3	W 46–0	5,210
December 5	1:00 pm	Western Illinois*	No. 4	Hancock Stadium; Normal, IL (NCAA Division I Second Round)	ESPN3	W 36–19	6,124
December 11	6:30 pm	No. 12 Richmond*	No. 4	Hancock Stadium; Normal, IL (NCAA Division I Quarterfinal)	ESPN3	L 27–39	5,356
*Non-conference game; Rankings from STATS Poll released prior to the game; All times are in Central time

== Game summaries ==
=== @ Iowa ===
	1	2	3	4	Total
#2 Redbirds	0	0	0	14	14
Hawkeyes	7	10	7	7	31

=== Morgan State ===
	1	2	3	4	Total
Bears	0	7	7	0	14
#4 Redbirds	22	14	21	10	67

=== @ Eastern Illinois ===
	1	2	3	4	OT	Total
#5 Redbirds	10	14	0	7	3	34
Panthers	14	7	0	10	0	31

=== Northern Iowa ===
	1	2	3	4	Total
#7 Panthers	0	7	3	3	13
#4 Redbirds	0	0	7	14	21

=== @ Youngstown State ===
	1	2	3	4	Total
#4 Redbirds	7	7	3	14	31
#9 Penguins	6	3	3	17	29

=== @ Missouri State ===
	1	2	3	4	Total
#4 Redbirds	14	17	7	0	38
Bears	0	0	0	2	2

=== Western Illinois ===
	1	2	3	4	Total
#20 Leathernecks	7	14	7	0	28
#3 Redbirds	14	7	14	13	48

=== Indiana State ===
	1	2	3	4	Total
#21 Sycamores	0	21	3	0	24
#3 Redbirds	2	7	7	11	27

=== @ South Dakota State ===
	1	2	3	4	Total
#2 Redbirds	7	0	7	6	20
#11 Jackrabbits	0	13	6	6	25

=== @ Southern Illinois ===
	1	2	3	4	Total
#6 Redbirds	0	14	21	7	42
Salukis	0	21	0	0	21

=== South Dakota ===
	1	2	3	4	Total
Coyotes	0	0	0	0	0
#6 Redbirds	3	20	13	10	46

=== Western Illinois—NCAA Division I Second Round ===
	1	2	3	4	Total
Leathernecks	3	3	6	7	19
#4 Redbirds	7	0	8	21	36

=== Richmond—NCAA Division I Quarterfinal ===
	1	2	3	4	Total
#12 Spiders	10	9	6	14	39
#4 Redbirds	0	7	7	13	27

== Ranking movements ==
Ranking movements Legend: ██ Increase in ranking ██ Decrease in ranking ( ) = First-place votes
	Week													
Poll	Pre	1	2	3	4	5	6	7	8	9	10	11	12	Final
STATS FCS	2 (3)	4 (20)	5 (6)	4 (2)	4 (2)	4 (1)	4 (1)	3 (6)	3 (3)	2 (18)	6	6	4	5
Coaches	2	5 (6)	6 (1)	5	4	4	4	4 (2)	3 (20)	2 (3)	6	6	4	5
