= 2015 South Dakota Coyotes football team =

American college football season

2015 South Dakota Coyotes football
- Conference: Missouri Valley Football Conference
- Record: 5–6 (3–5 MVFC)
- Head coach: Joe Glenn (4th season)
- Offensive coordinator: Wesley Beschorner (7th season)
- Offensive scheme: Spread
- Defensive coordinator: Jason Petrino (4th season)
- Base defense: 4–3
- Home stadium: DakotaDome

2015 Missouri Valley Football Conference standings
	Conf.			Overall
Team	W		L	W		L
No. 1 North Dakota State +^	7	–	1	13	–	2
No. 5 Illinois State +^	7	–	1	10	–	3
No. 8 Northern Iowa ^	5	–	3	9	–	5
No. 15 South Dakota State ^	5	–	3	8	–	4
Western Illinois ^	5	–	3	7	–	6
Indiana State	3	–	5	5	–	6
Youngstown State	3	–	5	5	–	6
South Dakota	3	–	5	5	–	6
Southern Illinois	2	–	6	3	–	8
Missouri State	0	–	8	1	–	10
+ – Conference co-champions; ^ – FCS playoff participant; Rankings from STATS Poll

The 2015 South Dakota Coyotes football team represented the University of South Dakota in the 2015 NCAA Division I FCS football season. They were led by fourth year head coach Joe Glenn and played their home games in the DakotaDome. They were a member of the Missouri Valley Football Conference. They finished the season 5–6, 3–5 in MVFC play to finish in a three-way tie for sixth place.

On November 23, head coach Joe Glenn retired. He finished at South Dakota with a four-year record of 12–34.

== Schedule ==
Date	Time	Opponent	Site	TV	Result	Attendance
September 5	6:00 pm	at Kansas State*	Bill Snyder Family Football Stadium; Manhattan, KS	K-StateHD.TV	L 0–34	53,297
September 12	8:00 pm	at UC Davis*	Aggie Stadium; Davis, CA		W 27–17	5,112
September 19	2:00 pm	Drake*	DakotaDome; Vermillion, SD	Midco/ESPN3	W 52–0	8,045
October 3	2:00 pm	No. 10 Youngstown State	DakotaDome; Vermillion, SD	Midco/ESPN3	L 3–31	10,015
October 10	3:00 pm	at Western Illinois	Hanson Field; Macomb, IL	MVC TV/ESPN3	L 21–40	6,298
October 17	2:30 pm	at No. 2 North Dakota State	Fargodome; Fargo, ND	Midco/ESPN3	W 24–21	18,420
October 24	2:00 pm	Missouri State	DakotaDome; Vermillion, SD	Midco/ESPN3	W 40–10	8,723
October 31	1:00 pm	at No. 18 Northern Iowa	UNI-Dome; Cedar Falls, IA	ESPN3	L 7–20	10,476
November 7	1:00 pm	Southern Illinois	DakotaDome; Vermillion, SD	ESPN3	W 34–31	8,012
November 14	1:00 pm	No. 5 South Dakota State	DakotaDome; Vermillion, SD (rivalry)	Midco/ESPN3	L 23–30	10,345
November 21	12:00 pm	at No. 6 Illinois State	Hancock Stadium; Normal, IL	ESPN3	L 0–46	5,210
*Non-conference game; Rankings from STATS FCS at time of game Poll released prior to the game; All times are in Central time

- Source: Schedule
