= Andrew Bonnet =

American football player (born 1992)

Profile
- Position: Fullback

Personal information
- Born: December 27, 1992 (age 33); Council Bluffs, Iowa, U.S.
- Listed height: 6 ft 3 in (1.91 m)
- Listed weight: 250 lb (113 kg)

Career information
- High school: Underwood (IA)
- College: North Dakota State
- NFL draft: 2016: undrafted

Career history
- Carolina Panthers (2016)*; Cincinnati Bengals (2016)*; Philadelphia Eagles (2016–2017)*
- * Offseason or practice squad member only

Awards and highlights
- 5× FCS national champion (2011–2015); 2014 Sports Network All-America Third-team; 2014 College Sporting News "Fab 50" All-America; 2014 All-MVFC First-team; 2012 MVFC All-Newcomer Team
- Stats at Pro Football Reference

Andrew Bonnet (born December 27, 1992) is an American former football fullback. He played college football at North Dakota State University.

== Professional career ==
=== Carolina Panthers ===
After going undrafted in the 2016 NFL draft, Bonnet signed with the Carolina Panthers on May 2, 2016. On May 20, 2016, he was waived by the Panthers.

=== Cincinnati Bengals ===
Bonnet was then signed by the Cincinnati Bengals. On September 3, 2016, he was waived by the Bengals.

=== Philadelphia Eagles ===
On September 5, 2016, Bonnet was signed to the practice squad of the Philadelphia Eagles. He was released on October 11, 2016. He later signed a reserve/future contract with the Eagles on January 12, 2017. On May 4, 2017, he was released by the Eagles.
