= 2015 Northern Iowa Panthers football team =

American college football season

2015 Northern Iowa Panthers football

FNCAA Division I Quarterfinal, L 13–23 at North Dakota State
- Conference: Missouri Valley Football Conference

Ranking
- Sports Network: No. 8
- FCS Coaches: No. 6
- Record: 9–5 (5–3 MVFC)
- Head coach: Mark Farley (15th season)
- Offensive coordinator: Bill Salmon (15th season)
- Offensive scheme: Multiple
- Defensive coordinator: Jeremiah Johnson (3rd season)
- Base defense: 3–4
- Home stadium: UNI-Dome

2015 Missouri Valley Football Conference standings
	Conf.			Overall
Team	W		L	W		L
No. 1 North Dakota State +^	7	–	1	13	–	2
No. 5 Illinois State +^	7	–	1	10	–	3
No. 8 Northern Iowa ^	5	–	3	9	–	5
No. 15 South Dakota State ^	5	–	3	8	–	4
Western Illinois ^	5	–	3	7	–	6
Indiana State	3	–	5	5	–	6
Youngstown State	3	–	5	5	–	6
South Dakota	3	–	5	5	–	6
Southern Illinois	2	–	6	3	–	8
Missouri State	0	–	8	1	–	10
+ – Conference co-champions; ^ – FCS playoff participant; Rankings from STATS Poll

The 2015 Northern Iowa Panthers football team was an American college football team that represented the University of Northern Iowa as a member of the Missouri Valley Football Conference (MVFC) during the 2015 NCAA Division I FCS football season. In its 15th year under head coach Mark Farley, the team compiled a 9–5 record (5–3 in conference games), outscored opponents by a total of 413 to 274, and finished in a three-way tie for third place in the MVFC. Northern Iowa received an at-large bid to the Division I FCS playoffs, where it defeated Eastern Illinois in the first round and Portland State in the second round before losing to the eventual FCS national champion, North Dakota State, in the quarterfinals. The team set a new school record with 3,266 rushing yards during the 2015 season.

Defensive back Deiondre' Hall had 15 pass breakups and 13 interceptions (two returned for touchdown), was selected as the MVFC defensive player of the year, and received first-team FCS All-America honors from multiple selectors. Dual-threat quarterback Aaron Bailey, who transferred to Northern Iowa from Illinois, led the team with 2,990 yards of total offense (including 1,334 rushing yards) and with 119 points scored (19 rushing touchdowns) and was selected as the MVFC newcomer of the year. Five Northern Iowa players were selected as first-team players on the 2015 all-MVFC football team: Hall; offensive lineman Jacob Rathmacher; defensive end Karter Schult; linebacker Brett McMakin; and strong safety Tim Kilfoy. Five others, including Bailey, were named to the second team. Schult tallied 15 sacks and 23 tackles for loss.

The team played its home games at the UNI-Dome in Cedar Falls, Iowa.

== Schedule ==
Date	Time	Opponent	Rank	Site	TV	Result	Attendance	Source
September 5	7:00 pm	at Iowa State*	No. 10	Jack Trice Stadium; Ames, IA	Cyclones.tv	L 7–31	61,500	
September 12	1:00 pm	No. 7 Eastern Washington*	No. 14	UNI-Dome; Cedar Falls, IA	ESPN3	W 38–35	12,292	
September 19	9:30 pm	at No. 17 Cal Poly*	No. 9	Alex G. Spanos Stadium; San Luis Obispo, CA	ASN	W 34–20	11,075	
October 3	12:00 pm	at No. 4 Illinois State	No. 7	Hancock Stadium; Normal, IL	MVC TV, ESPN3	L 13–21	13,391	
October 10	1:00 pm	at No. 3 North Dakota State	No. 10	Fargodome; Fargo, ND	ESPN3	L 28–31	18,954	
October 17	4:00 pm	Western Illinois	No. 12	UNI-Dome; Cedar Falls, IA	ESPN3	L 19–24	16,324	
October 24	2:00 pm	at No. 6 South Dakota State	No. 22	Coughlin–Alumni Stadium; Brookings, SD	ESPN3	W 10–7	16,042	
October 31	1:00 pm	South Dakota	No. 18	UNI-Dome; Cedar Falls, IA	ESPN3	W 20–7	10,476	
November 7	4:00 pm	No. 23 Indiana State	No. 17	UNI-Dome; Cedar Falls, IA	ESPN3	W 59–13	13,224	
November 14	2:00 pm	at Missouri State	No. 17	Robert W. Plaster Stadium; Springfield, MO	ESPN3	W 41–0	5,223	
November 21	4:00 pm	Southern Illinois	No. 15	UNI-Dome; Cedar Falls, IA	MVC TV, ESPN3	W 49–28	9,915	
November 28	5:00 pm	No. 24 Eastern Illinois*	No. 15	UNI-Dome; Cedar Falls, IA (NCAA Division I First Round)	ESPN3	W 53–17	7,062	
December 5	9:00 pm	at No. 5 Portland State*	No. 15	Providence Park; Portland, OR (NCAA Division I Second Round)	ESPN3	W 29–17	8,022	
December 12	11:00 am	at No. 2 North Dakota State*	No. 15	Fargodome; Fargo, ND (NCAA Division I Quarterfinal)	ESPN	L 13–23	18,041	
*Non-conference game; Rankings from STATS Poll released prior to the game; All times are in Central time

== Rankings ==
Ranking movements Legend: ██ Increase in ranking ██ Decrease in ranking ( ) = First-place votes
	Week													
Poll	Pre	1	2	3	4	5	6	7	8	9	10	11	12	Final
STATS FCS	10	14	9	7	7 (1)	10	12	22	18	17	17	15	15	8
Coaches	10	14	11	6	6	10	14	25	21	20	19	15	14	6
