= 2015 Colonial Athletic Association football season =

2015 CAA football season
- League: NCAA Division I FCS (Football Championship Subdivision)
- Sport: Football
- Duration: September 3, 2015 – December 12, 2015
- Teams: 12
- TV partner(s): NBCSN; Comcast SportsNet; American Sports Network; CAA.TV
- Conference champions: James Madison; Richmond; William & Mary

CAA football seasons
- ← 2014 2016 →

2015 Colonial Athletic Association football standings
	Conf.			Overall
Team	W		L	W		L
No. 4 Richmond +^	6	–	2	10	–	4
No. 11 James Madison +^	6	–	2	9	–	3
No. 12 William & Mary +^	6	–	2	9	–	4
Towson	5	–	3	7	–	4
New Hampshire ^	5	–	3	7	–	5
Villanova	5	–	3	6	–	5
Stony Brook	3	–	5	5	–	5
Delaware	3	–	5	4	–	7
Elon	3	–	5	4	–	7
Maine	3	–	5	3	–	8
Albany	2	–	6	3	–	8
Rhode Island	1	–	7	1	–	10
+ – Conference co-champions; ^ – FCS playoff participant; Rankings from STATS Poll

The 2015 Colonial Athletic Association football season was the ninth season of football for the Colonial Athletic Association (CAA) and part of the 2015 NCAA Division I FCS football season.

== Head coaches ==
Team	Coach	Season	Overall Record	Record at School	CAA Record
Albany	Greg Gattuso	2nd	104–37 (.738)	7–5 (.583)	3–5 (.375)
Delaware	Dave Brock	3rd	13–11 (.542)	13–11 (.542)	8–8 (.500)
Elon	Rich Skrosky	2nd	2–19 (.095)	1–11 (.083)	0–8 (.000)
James Madison	Everett Withers	2nd	17–10 (.630)	9–4 (.692)	6–2 (.750)
Maine	Jack Cosgrove	23rd	126–127 (.498)	126–127 (.498)	87–92 (.486)
New Hampshire	Sean McDonnell	17th	126–73 (.633)	126–73 (.633)	79–52 (.603)
Rhode Island	Jim Fleming	2nd	22–12 (.647)	1–11 (.083)	1–7 (.125)
Richmond	Danny Rocco	4th	70–34 (.673)	23–14 (.622)	15–9 (.625)
Stony Brook	Chuck Priore	10th	96–56 (.632)	57–47 (.548)	7–9 (.438)
Towson	Rob Ambrose	7th	39–44 (.470)	36–37 (.493)	24–26 (.480)
Villanova	Andy Talley	31st	243–147–2 (.622)	215–128–1 (.626)	131–88 (.598)
William & Mary	Jimmye Laycock	36th	230–169–2 (.576)	230–169–2 (.576)	99–77 (.563)

Records are from before start of 2015 season

== Preseason poll results ==
First place votes in parentheses

Place	School
1	Villanova (14)
2	James Madison (5)
3	New Hampshire (5)
4	William & Mary
5	Richmond
6	Delaware
7	Maine
8	Stony Brook
9	Towson
10	Albany
11	Rhode Island
12	Elon

== Rankings ==
Legend
	Increase in ranking
	Decrease in ranking
	Not ranked previous week
RV	Receiving votes

		Pre	Wk 1	Wk 2	Wk 3	Wk 4	Wk 5	Wk 6	Wk 7	Wk 8	Wk 9	Wk 10	Wk 11	Wk 12	Final
Albany	S														
Albany	C														
Delaware	S	RV	RV	RV			RV								
Delaware	C									RV					
Elon	S														
Elon	C														
James Madison	S	12	13	12	9	6	5	5	4	9	14	14	12	8	11
James Madison	C	13	11	10	8	5	5	5	3	9	14	11	10	6	11
Maine	S	RV													
Maine	C	RV													
New Hampshire	S	9	12	13	21	20	21	19	RV	RV	RV	RV	RV	RV	RV
New Hampshire	C	7	15	13	24	23	22	20	RV	RV			RV	RV	RV
Rhode Island	S														
Rhode Island	C														
Richmond	S	18	22	22	19	19	16	13	11	6	5	9	14	12	4
Richmond	C	18	22	23	20	20	18	13	12	8	7	12	16	11	3
Stony Brook	S		RV	RV	RV	RV	RV	RV	RV						
Stony Brook	C				RV										
Towson	S	RV	RV	RV	RV					RV	RV	RV	RV	RV	RV
Towson	C	RV	RV	RV	RV	RV	RV		RV	RV	RV	RV	RV	RV	RV
Villanova	S	4	6	6	5	14	14	25	23	RV	RV	RV	RV	RV	RV
Villanova	C	3	2	3	4	17	16	24	22	RV	RV	RV	RV		RV
William & Mary	S	RV	RV	RV	RV	25	RV	24	17	16	12	7	7	13	12
William & Mary	C	RV	25	RV	25	22	RV	24	16	15	12	7	7	13	12

== Regular season ==
Index to colors and formatting
CAA member won
CAA member lost
CAA teams in **bold**

All times Eastern time.

Rankings reflect that of the STATS FCS poll for that week.

=== Week One ===
Date	Time	Visiting team	Home team	Site	TV	Result	Attendance	Reference
September 3	7:00 PM	**Elon**	Wake Forest	BB&T Field at Groves Stadium • Winston-Salem, NC	ESPN3	**L** 3–41	27,126	
September 3	7:00 PM	**Stony Brook**	Toledo	Glass Bowl • Toledo, OH	ESPN3	**Cancelled**		
September 3	7:30 PM	**#4 Villanova**	Connecticut	Rentschler Field • East Hartford, CT	SNY/ESPN3	**L** 15–20	26,113	
September 3	10:00 PM	**#9 New Hampshire**	San Jose State	Spartan Stadium • San Jose, CA		**L** 13–43	15,198	
September 4	7:00 PM	Jacksonville	**Delaware**	Delaware Stadium • Newark, DE		**L** 14–20	17,472	
September 4	7:00 PM	**Rhode Island**	Syracuse	Carrier Dome • Syracuse, NY	ESPN3	**L** 0–47	30,112	
September 5	12:00 PM	**#18 Richmond**	Maryland	Byrd Stadium • College Park, MD	ESPNU	**L** 21–50	38,117	
September 5	1:00 PM	**Maine**	Boston College	Alumni Stadium • Chestnut Hill, MA	ESPN3	**L** 3–24	29,262	
September 5	3:30 PM	**Albany**	Buffalo	University at Buffalo Stadium • Amherst, NY	ESPN3	**L** 14–51	20,872	
September 5	6:00 PM	**Towson**	East Carolina	Dowdy–Ficklen Stadium • Greenville, NC	ESPN3	**L** 20–28	40,712	
September 5	6:00 PM	Morehead State	**#12 James Madison**	Bridgeforth Stadium • Harrisonburg, VA		**W** 56–7	22,080	
September 5	6:00 PM	**William & Mary**	Lafayette	Fisher Field • Easton, PA		**W** 34–7	7,647	

Players of the week:

Offensive		Defensive		Freshman		Special teams	
Player	Team	Player	Team	Player	Team	Player	Team
Vad Lee, QB	James Madison	Raven Greene, S	James Madison	Elijah Ibitokun-Hanks, RB	Albany	David Petroni, P	Elon

=== Week Two ===
Date	Time	Visiting team	Home team	Site	TV	Result	Attendance	Reference
September 12	12:00 PM	**#22 Richmond**	Hampton	Armstrong Stadium • Hampton, VA		**W** 31–28	3,515	
September 12	3:30 PM	**Rhode Island**	**Albany**	Bob Ford Field • Albany, NY	ASN	**ALB** 35–7	6,081	
September 12	4:00 PM	Lehigh	**#13 James Madison**	Bridgeforth Stadium • Harrisonburg, VA		**W** 55–17	15,949	
September 12	6:00 PM	**#6 Villanova**	#16 Fordham	Coffey Field • The Bronx, NY		**W** 14–7	6,586	
September 12	6:00 PM	**#12 New Hampshire**	Colgate	Andy Kerr Stadium • Hamilton, NY		**W** 26–8	2,988	
September 12	6:00 PM	Lafayette	**Delaware**	Delaware Stadium • Newark, DE		**W** 19–9	12,809	
September 12	6:00 PM	**Elon**	Gardner–Webb	Ernest W. Spangler Stadium • Boiling Springs, NC		**W** 21–13 ^{3OT}	5,450	
September 12	6:00 PM	St. Francis (PA)	**Towson**	Johnny Unitas Stadium • Towson, MD		**W** 35–20	7,911	
September 12	6:00 PM	Central Connecticut	**Stony Brook**	Kenneth P. LaValle Stadium • Stony Brook, NY		**W** 38–9	6,513	

Players of the week:

Offensive		Defensive		Freshman		Special teams	
Player	Team	Player	Team	Player	Team	Player	Team
Stacey Bedell, RB	Stony Brook	Corey Mitchell, LB	Elon	Elliot Croskey, RB	Albany	Rashad Robinson, CB	James Madison

=== Week Three ===
Date	Time	Visiting team	Home team	Site	TV	Result	Attendance	Reference
September 19	12:00 PM	**Delaware**	**#6 Villanova**	Villanova Stadium • Villanova, PA	CSN	**VIL** 28–21	11,779	
September 19	1:00 PM	#25 Harvard	**Rhode Island**	Meade Stadium • Kingston, RI		**L** 10–41	4,843	
September 19	3:00 PM	**Albany**	**#12 James Madison**	Bridgeforth Stadium • Harrisonburg, VA	CSN	**JMU** 42–28	18,659	
September 19	3:30 PM	**William & Mary**	Virginia	Scott Stadium • Charlottesville, VA	ESPN3	**L** 29–35	41,881	
September 19	6:00 PM	Holy Cross	**Towson**	Johnny Unitas Stadium • Towson, MD		**W** 29–26	5,682	
September 19	6:00 PM	North Carolina A&T	**Elon**	Rhodes Stadium • Elon, NC		**L** 7–14	9,729	
September 19	6:00 PM	VMI	**#22 Richmond**	E. Claiborne Robins Stadium • Richmond, VA		**W** 42–10	8,700	
September 19	7:00 PM	**#13 New Hampshire**	**Stony Brook**	Kenneth P. LaValle Stadium • Stony Brook, NY	ASN	**SBU** 31–6	7,072	
September 19	8:00 PM	**Maine**	Tulane	Yulman Stadium • New Orleans, LA	ESPN3	**L** 7–38	21,114	

Players of the week:

Offensive		Defensive		Freshman		Special teams	
Player	Team	Player	Team	Player	Team	Player	Team
Darius Victor, RB	Towson	Victor Ochi, DL	Stony Brook	Zach Bednarczyk, QB	Villanova	DeAndre Houston-Carson, S	William & Mary

=== Week Four ===
Date	Time	Visiting team	Home team	Site	TV	Result	Attendance	Reference
September 24	7:00 PM	Penn	**#5 Villanova**	Villanova Stadium • Villanova, PA		**L** 13–24	5,727	
September 26	12:30 PM	**Delaware**	North Carolina	Kenan Memorial Stadium • Chapel Hill, NC	ESPN3	**L** 14–41	39,000	
September 26	3:00 PM	**Towson**	**Elon**	Rhodes Stadium • Elon, NC		**ELON** 17–13	8,027	
September 26	3:30 PM	**Rhode Island**	**Maine**	Alfond Stadium • Orono, ME	ASN	**MAINE** 27–17	7,535	
September 26	3:30 PM	Duquesne	**Albany**	Bob Ford Field • Albany, NY		**W** 17–14	6,227	
September 26	6:00 PM	Central Connecticut	**#21 New Hampshire**	Cowell Stadium • Durham, NH		**W** 57–14	6,215	
September 26	7:00 PM	**#9 James Madison**	SMU	Gerald J. Ford Stadium • Dallas, TX	ESPN3	**W** 48–45	22,314	
September 26	7:30 PM	**Stony Brook**	**William & Mary**	Zable Stadium • Williamsburg, VA	CSN	**W&M** 21–0	8,362	

Players of the week:

Offensive		Defensive		Freshman		Special teams	
Player	Team	Player	Team	Player	Team	Player	Team
Vad Lee, QB	James Madison	Andrew Ankrah, LB	James Madison	Thomas Jefferson, RB	Delaware	Jon Martin, P	Albany

=== Week Five ===
Date	Time	Visiting team	Home team	Site	TV	Result	Attendance	Reference
October 3	12:00 PM	Stony Brook	**#6 James Madison**	Bridgeforth Stadium • Harrisonburg, VA	CSN	**JMU** 38–20	21,653	
October 3	1:05 PM	Albany	Holy Cross	Fitton Field • Worcester, MA		**L** 0–37	3,841	
October 3	3:30 PM	Elon	**#20 New Hampshire**	Cowell Stadium • Durham, NH	ASN	**UNH** 37–14	16,713	
October 3	3:30 PM	Maine	**#19 Richmond**	E. Claiborne Robins Stadium • Richmond, VA		**RICH** 48–17	7,228	
October 3	6:00 PM	Rhode Island	Brown	Brown Stadium • Providence, RI		**L** 31–41	5,183	
October 3	7:30 PM	#25 William & Mary	**Delaware**	Delaware Stadium • Newark, DE	NBCSN	**DEL** 24–23	12,437	

Players of the week:

Offensive		Defensive		Freshman		Special teams	
Player	Team	Player	Team	Player	Team	Player	Team
Dalton Crossan, RB; Kyle Lauletta, QB	New Hampshire; Richmond	Gage Steele, LB	James Madison	Thomas Jefferson, RB	Delaware	Harold Cooper, RB	Rhode Island

=== Week Six ===
Date	Time	Visiting team	Home team	Site	TV	Result	Attendance	Reference
October 10	12:00 PM	**William & Mary**	**#14 Villanova**	Villanova Stadium • Villanova, PA	CSN	**W&M** 38–16	5,809	
October 10	12:00 PM	**Delaware**	**Rhode Island**	Meade Stadium • Kingston, RI		**URI** 20–0	4,105	
October 10	3:00 PM	**#5 James Madison**	**Towson**	Johnny Unitas Stadium • Towson, MD	CSN	**JMU** 51–30	8,224	
October 10	3:30 PM	**Maine**	**Albany**	Bob Ford Field • Albany, NY		**MAINE** 39–7	8,500	
October 10	3:30 PM	**Elon**	**#16 Richmond**	E. Claiborne Robins Stadium • Richmond, VA		**RICH** 27–14	8,216	

Players of the week:

Offensive		Defensive		Freshman		Special teams	
Player	Team	Player	Team	Player	Team	Player	Team
Vad Lee, QB	James Madison	Patrick Ricard, DL	Maine	Tez Wilson, LB	Rhode Island	Charles Tutt, KR/CB	James Madison

=== Week Seven ===
Date	Time	Visiting team	Home team	Site	TV	Result	Attendance	Reference
October 17	12:00 PM	**#19 New Hampshire**	#24 William & Mary	Zable Stadium • Williamsburg, VA	CSN	**W&M** 34–18	10,180	
October 17	12:00 PM	**#13 Richmond**	Rhode Island	Meade Stadium • Kingston, RI		**RICH** 37–12	6,143	
October 17	3:00 PM	**#5 James Madison**	Elon	Rhodes Stadium • Elon, NC		**JMU** 51–0	8,342	
October 17	3:30 PM	**#25 Villanova**	Albany	Bob Ford Field • Albany, NY	ASN	**VIL** 37–0	4,811	
October 17	3:30 PM	Yale	Maine	Alfond Stadium • Orono, ME		**L** 10–21	7,351	
October 17	6:00 PM	**Towson**	Stony Brook	Kenneth P. LaValle Stadium • Stony Brook, NY		**TOW** 21–14	12,177	

Players of the week:

Offensive		Defensive		Freshman		Special teams	
Player	Team	Player	Team	Player	Team	Player	Team
Kendell Anderson, RB	William & Mary	Cameron McCurry, S	Villanova	Zach Bednarczyk, QB	Villanova	DeAndre Houston-Carson, S	William & Mary

=== Week Eight ===
Date	Time	Visiting team	Home team	Site	TV	Result	Attendance	Reference
October 24	12:30 PM	**Stony Brook**	**Maine**	Alfond Stadium • Orono, ME		**MAINE** 23–10	4,144	
October 24	3:30 PM	**#11 Richmond**	**#4 James Madison**	Bridgeforth Stadium • Harrisonburg, VA	CSN	**RICH** 59–49	26,069	
October 24	3:30 PM	**New Hampshire**	**Delaware**	Delaware Stadium • Newark, DE		**DEL** 31–14	19,924	
October 24	3:30 PM	Hampton	**#17 William & Mary**	Zable Stadium • Williamsburg, VA		**W** 40–7	11,736	
October 24	7:00 PM	**#23 Villanova**	**Towson**	Johnny Unitas Stadium • Towson, MD	ASN	**TOW** 28–21	7,387	

Players of the week:

Offensive		Defensive		Freshman		Special teams	
Player	Team	Player	Team	Player	Team	Player	Team
Jacobi Green, RB	Richmond	Trevor Bates, DL	Maine	Thomas Jefferson, RB	Delaware	Nick Dorka, K	William & Mary

=== Week Nine ===
Date	Time	Visiting team	Home team	Site	TV	Result	Attendance	Reference
October 31	12:00 PM	Elon	Stony Brook	Kenneth P. LaValle Stadium • Stony Brook, NY	ASN	**ELON** 21–7	5,578	
October 31	1:00 PM	Rhode Island	New Hampshire	Cowell Stadium • Durham, NH		**UNH** 20–17	5,003	
October 31	2:00 PM	Delaware	Towson	Johnny Unitas Stadium • Towson, MD		**TOW** 19–0	5,234	
October 31	3:30 PM	Albany	#6 Richmond	E. Claiborne Robins Stadium • Richmond, VA		**RICH** 38–31	8,475	
October 31	4:00 PM	#9 James Madison	#13 William & Mary	Zable Stadium • Williamsburg, VA	NBCSN	**W&M** 44–41	9,414	
October 31	7:30 PM	Maine	Villanova	Villanova Stadium • Villanova, PA	NBCSN	**VIL** 13–3	4,309	

Players of the week:

Offensive		Defensive		Freshman		Special teams	
Player	Team	Player	Team	Player	Team	Player	Team
Kendell Anderson, RB	William & Mary	David Jones, DB	Richmond	Elijah Ibitokun-Hanks, RB	Albany	Sam Hurwitz, K	Towson

=== Week Ten ===
Date	Time	Visiting team	Home team	Site	TV	Result	Attendance	Reference
November 7	12:00 PM	**#12 William & Mary**	Elon	Rhodes Stadium • Elon, NC	CSN	**W&M** 34–13	6,285	
November 7	12:00 PM	**Albany**	Delaware	Delaware Stadium • Newark, DE		**ALB** 17–6	15,318	
November 7	12:30 PM	**Villanova**	Rhode Island	Meade Stadium • Kingston, RI		**VIL** 24–3	6,122	
November 7	1:00 PM	Howard	Stony Brook	Kenneth P. LaValle Stadium • Stony Brook, NY		**W** 14–9	5,109	
November 7	3:00 PM	**#5 Richmond**	New Hampshire	Cowell Stadium • Durham, NH	NBCSN	**UNH** 30–25	4,992	
November 7	7:00 PM	**Towson**	Maine	Alfond Stadium • Orono, ME	ASN	**TOW** 10–7	3,196	

Players of the week:

Offensive		Defensive		Freshman		Special teams	
Player	Team	Player	Team	Player	Team	Player	Team
Sean Goldrich, QB	New Hampshire	Malachi Hoskins, DL	Albany	Donald Liotine, RB	Stony Brook	DeVonte Dedmon, WR/PR	William & Mary

=== Week Eleven ===
Date	Time	Visiting team	Home team	Site	TV	Result	Attendance	Reference
November 14	12:30 PM	Stony Brook	Rhode Island	Meade Stadium • Kingston, RI		**SBU** 19–7	2,643	
November 14	12:30 PM	Elon	Maine	Alfond Stadium • Orono, ME		**ELON** 27–22	3,131	
November 14	1:30 PM	Towson	#7 William & Mary	Zable Stadium • Williamsburg, VA		**W&M** 31–17	9,715	
November 14	3:30 PM	#14 James Madison	Delaware	Delaware Stadium • Newark, DE	CSN	**JMU** 24–21	16,994	
November 14	3:30 PM	#9 Richmond	Villanova	Villanova Stadium • Villanova, PA		**NOVA** 21–20	6,211	
November 14	7:00 PM	New Hampshire	Albany	Bob Ford Field • Albany, NY	ASN	**UNH** 24–14	3,814	

Players of the week:

Offensive		Defensive		Freshman		Special teams	
Player	Team	Player	Team	Player	Team	Player	Team
Steve Cluley, QB	William & Mary	Cameron McCurry, S	Villanova	Micah Wright, WR	Maine	Kye Morgan, DB	Stony Brook

=== Week Twelve ===
Date	Time	Visiting team	Home team	Site	TV	Result	Attendance	Reference
November 21	12:00 PM	#7 William & Mary	#14 Richmond	E. Claiborne Robins Stadium • Richmond, VA	CSN	**RICH** 20–9	8,700	
November 21	12:00 PM	Villanova	#12 James Madison	Bridgeforth Stadium • Harrisonburg, VA		**JMU** 38–29	17,028	
November 21	12:00 PM	Delaware	Elon	Rhodes Stadium • Elon, NC		**DEL** 14–10	6,823	
November 21	1:00 PM	Maine	New Hampshire	Cowell Stadium • Durham, NH		**UNH** 22–6	7,594	
November 21	1:00 PM	Albany	Stony Brook	Kenneth P. LaValle Stadium • Stony Brook, NY		**SBU** 20–2	7,158	
November 21	2:00 PM	Rhode Island	Towson	Johnny Unitas Stadium • Towson, MD		**TOW** 38–21	5,128	

Players of the week:

Offensive		Defensive		Freshman		Special teams	
Player	Team	Player	Team	Player	Team	Player	Team
Jacobi Green, RB	Richmond	Jordan Brown, DB	James Madison	Donald Liotine, RB	Stony Brook	Brandon Ravenel, KR/WR	James Madison

=== FCS Playoffs ===
Date	Time	Visiting team	Home team	Round	Site	TV	Result	Attendance	Reference
November 28	3:30 PM	Duquesne	**#13 William & Mary**	First Round	Zable Stadium • Williamsburg, VA	ESPN3	**W** 52–49	4,395	
November 28	3:30 PM	Colgate	**New Hampshire**	First Round	Cowell Stadium • Durham, NH	ESPN3	**L** 20–27	3,303	
December 5	12:00 PM	**#13 William & Mary**	**#12 Richmond**	Second Round	E. Claiborne Robins Stadium • Richmond, VA	ESPN3	**RICH** 48–13	7,277	
December 5	1:00 PM	Colgate	**#8 James Madison**	Second Round	Bridgeforth Stadium • Harrisonburg, VA	ESPN3	**L** 38–44	15,045	
December 11	7:00 PM	**#12 Richmond**	#4 Illinois State	Quarterfinals	Hancock Stadium • Normal, IL	ESPN3	**W** 39–27	5,356	
December 18	8:00 PM	**#12 Richmond**	#2 North Dakota State	Semifinals	Fargodome • Fargo, ND	ESPN2	**L** 7–33	18,105	

== Postseason Awards ==
- Coach of the Year – Danny Rocco (Richmond)
- Offensive Player of the Year – Vad Lee, SR, QB (James Madison)
- Co-Defensive Players of the Year – DeAndre Houston-Carson, SR, S (William & Mary); Victor Ochi, SR, DL (Stony Brook)
- Special Teams Player of the Year – DeVonte Dedmon, SO, RS/WR (William & Mary)
- Co-Offensive Rookies of the Year – Zach Bednarczyk, QB (Villanova); Thomas Jefferson, RB (Delaware)
- Co-Defensive Rookies of the Year – Julian Cox, LB (Albany); Chris Tedder, LB (Towson)
- Chuck Boone Leadership Award – Jake Prus, JR, OL (Villanova)

=== All–Conference Teams ===
Position	First Team		Second Team		Third Team	
Position	Player	Team	Player	Team	Player	Team
QB	Vad Lee, SR	James Madison	Kyle Lauletta, SO	Richmond	Steve Cluley, JR	William & Mary
RB	Kendell Anderson, JR; Jacobi Green, SR	William & Mary; Richmond	Cardon Johnson, SO; Darius Victor, JR	James Madison; Towson	Harold Cooper, SO; Dalton Crossan, JR	Rhode Island; New Hampshire
FB/HB	Gary Underwood, SR	Villanova	Andrew Weidinger, SR	William & Mary	Emmanuel Holder, JR	Towson
WR	Ray Bolden, SO; Brian Brown, JR; Reggie Diggs, SR; Brandon Ravenel, JR	Stony Brook; Richmond; Richmond; James Madison	DeVonte Dedmon, SO; Kevin Gulyas, SR; Micah Wright, FR	William & Mary; Villanova; Maine	Jordan Dunn, JR; Christian Reeves, SR	Maine; William & Mary
TE	Jordan Powell, JR	New Hampshire	Andrew Caskin, SO; Deane Cheatham, SR	William & Mary; James Madison	Nick Holloway, SO; Charlie McKeeman, SO; Brandon Whaley, SO	Richmond; Rhode Island; Delaware
OL	Ben Curtis, SR; Bruce Johnson, SR; Andrew Jones, SR; Mitch Kirsch, JR; Nick Ritcher, SR	Delaware; Maine; William & Mary; James Madison; Richmond	Tyler Catalina, JR; Thomas Evans, JR; Austin Heter, SR; Timon Parris, SO; Nick Vergos, JR	Rhode Island; Richmond; New Hampshire; Stony Brook; Richmond	Connor Bozick, JR; Chris Durant, SO; Connor Hilland, SO; Brody Kern, SO; Kevin Malloy, JR; Jerry Ugokwe, JR	Delaware; William & Mary; William & Mary; Delaware; Albany; William & Mary
PK	Nick Dorka, SO	William & Mary	Peter Yoder, JR	Richmond	Sam Hurwitz, SR	Towson
KR	Harold Cooper, SO	Rhode Island	DeVonte Dedmon, SO	William & Mary	Dalton Crossan, JR	New Hampshire
PR	Casey DeAndrade, JR	New Hampshire	DeVonte Dedmon, SO	William & Mary	Donnell Lewis, SR	Towson
DL	Trevor Bates, SR; Tyler Claytor, SR; Tanoh Kpassagnon, JR; Victor Ochi, SR; Patrick Ricard, JR	Maine; William & Mary; Villanova; Stony Brook; Maine	Winston Craig, JR; Alex Mosley, SR; Aaron Thompson, JR; David Tinsley, SR; Blaine Woodson, SO	Richmond; James Madison; Stony Brook; Delaware; Delaware	Jon Desir, SR; Mike Ezirike, SO; Samuel Gray, SR; Bilal Nichols, SO; Jullian Turner, SR	Towson; Rhode Island; Albany; Delaware; New Hampshire
LB	Andrew Ankrah, SO; Don Cherry, SR; Omar Howard, JR; Luke Rhodes, SR	James Madison; Villanova; Richmond; William & Mary	Charles Bell, SO; Corey Mitchell, JR; Adam Parker, JR; Randy Samuels, SR	Delaware; Elon; Rhode Island; Maine	Akil Anderson, SR; Tyrice Beverette, SO; Austin Calitro, JR; Julian Cox, FR; John Silas, JR	New Hampshire; Stony Brook; Villanova; Albany; Elon
CB	Casey DeAndrede, JR; Ayo Ogunniyi, SR; Taylor Reynolds, JR	New Hampshire; Richmond; James Madison	Malik Reaves, SO; Trey Reed, JR	Villanova; William & Mary	Jason Ceneus, JR; Myles Holmes, SR; Justin Watson, SO	Villanova; Rhode Island; Delaware
S	DeAndre Houston-Carson, SR; David Jones, JR	William & Mary; Richmond	Raven Greene, JR; Tim Wienclaw, SR	James Madison; Rhode Island	Donnell Lewis, SR; Cameron McCurry, SR	Towson; Villanova
P	Hunter Windmuller, JR	William & Mary	Eric Enderson, JR	Delaware	Gunnar Kane, JR; David Petroni, JR	James Madison; Elon

== Records against other conferences ==
=== CAA vs. FCS conferences ===
Conference	Record
Big South	1–0
Ivy League	0–4
MEAC	3–1
MVFC	1–1
NEC	5–0
Patriot	6–3
Pioneer	1–1
Southern	1–0
Total	18–10

=== CAA vs. FBS conferences ===
Conference	Record
ACC	0–5
American	1–3
Big Ten	0–1
MAC	0–1
MWC	0–1
Total	1–11

== Attendance ==
Team	Stadium	Capacity	Game 1	Game 2	Game 3	Game 4	Game 5	Game 6	Game 7	Total	Average	% of Capacity
Albany	Bob Ford Field	8,500	6,081	6,227	8,500	4,811	3,814			29,433	5,887	69%
Delaware	Delaware Stadium	22,000	17,472	12,809	12,437	19,924	15,318	16,994		94,954	15,826	72%
Elon	Rhodes Stadium	11,250	9,729	8,027	8,342	6,285	6,823			39,206	7,841	70%
James Madison	Bridgeforth Stadium	24,877	22,080	15,949	18,659	21,653	26,069	17,028	15,045	136,483	19,498	78%
Maine	Alfond Stadium	10,000	7,535	7,351	4,144	3,196	3,131			25,375	5,071	51%
New Hampshire	Cowell Stadium	6,500	6,215	16,713	5,003	4,992	7,594	3,303		43,820	7,303	112%
Rhode Island	Meade Stadium	6,555	4,843	4,105	6,143	6,122	2,643			23,856	4,771	73%
Richmond	E. Claiborne Robins Stadium	8,700	8,700	7,228	8,216	8,475	8,700	7,277		48,596	8,099	93%
Stony Brook	Kenneth P. LaValle Stadium	8,136	6,513	7,072	12,177	5,578	5,109	7,158		43,607	7,268	89%
Towson	Johnny Unitas Stadium	11,198	7,911	5,682	8,224	7,387	5,234	5,128		39,566	6,594	59%
Villanova	Villanova Stadium	12,000	11,779	5,727	5,809	4,309	6,211			33,835	6,767	56%
William & Mary	Zable Stadium	11,686	8,362	10,180	11,736	9,414	9,715	4,395		53,800	8,967	77%

== NFL draft ==
The following list includes all CAA players who were drafted in the 2016 NFL draft.

Round #	Pick #	NFL team	Player	Position	College
6	185	Chicago Bears	DeAndre Houston-Carson	CB	William & Mary
7	239	Indianapolis Colts	Trevor Bates	LB	Maine
