= 2015 Maine Black Bears football team =

American college football season

2015 Maine Black Bears football
- Conference: Colonial Athletic Association
- Record: 3–8 (3–5 CAA)
- Head coach: Jack Cosgrove (23rd season)
- Offensive coordinator: Kevin Bourgoin
- Defensive coordinator: Joe Harasymiak
- Home stadium: Alfond Stadium

2015 Colonial Athletic Association football standings
	Conf.			Overall
Team	W		L	W		L
No. 4 Richmond +^	6	–	2	10	–	4
No. 11 James Madison +^	6	–	2	9	–	3
No. 12 William & Mary +^	6	–	2	9	–	4
Towson	5	–	3	7	–	4
New Hampshire ^	5	–	3	7	–	5
Villanova	5	–	3	6	–	5
Stony Brook	3	–	5	5	–	5
Delaware	3	–	5	4	–	7
Elon	3	–	5	4	–	7
Maine	3	–	5	3	–	8
Albany	2	–	6	3	–	8
Rhode Island	1	–	7	1	–	10
+ – Conference co-champions; ^ – FCS playoff participant; Rankings from STATS Poll

The 2015 Maine Black Bears football team represented the University of Maine in the 2015 NCAA Division I FCS football season. They were led by 23rd-year head coach Jack Cosgrove and played their home games at Alfond Stadium. They were a member of the Colonial Athletic Association. They finished the season 3–8, 3–5 in CAA play to finish in a four-way tie for seventh place.

On November 24, head coach Jack Cosgrove resigned to become the Senior Associate Director of Athletics at Maine. He finished his coaching career at Maine with a record of 129–135 in 23 seasons.

== Schedule ==
Date	Time	Opponent	Site	TV	Result	Attendance
September 5	1:00 pm	at Boston College*	Alumni Stadium; Chestnut Hill, MA	ESPN3	L 3–24	29,626
September 19	8:00 pm	at Tulane*	Yulman Stadium; New Orleans, LA	ESPN3	L 7–38	21,114
September 26	3:30 pm	Rhode Island	Alfond Stadium; Orono, ME	ASN	W 27–17	7,535
October 3	3:30 pm	at No. 19 Richmond	Robins Stadium; Richmond, VA	WVII	L 17–48	7,228
October 10	3:30 pm	at Albany	Bob Ford Field at Tom & Mary Casey Stadium; Albany, NY		W 39–7	8,500
October 17	3:30 pm	Yale*	Alfond Stadium; Orono, ME	BBTV	L 10–21	7,351
October 24	12:30 pm	Stony Brook	Alfond Stadium; Orono, ME	BBTV	W 23–10	4,144
October 31	7:30 pm	at Villanova	Villanova Stadium; Villanova, PA	NBCSN	L 3–13	4,309
November 7	7:00 pm	Towson	Alfond Stadium; Orono, ME	ASN	L 7–10	3,196
November 14	12:30 pm	Elon	Alfond Stadium; Orono, ME	BBTV	L 22–27	3,131
November 21	1:00 pm	at New Hampshire	Cowell Stadium; Durham, NH (Battle for the Brice–Cowell Musket)		L 6–22	7,594
*Non-conference game; Rankings from STATS Poll released prior to the game; All times are in Eastern time

== Game summaries ==
=== Boston College ===
	1	2	3	4	Total
Black Bears	3	0	0	0	3
Eagles	0	10	0	14	24

=== Tulane ===
	1	2	3	4	Total
Black Bears	7	0	0	0	7
Green Wave	3	21	14	0	38

=== Rhode Island ===
	1	2	3	4	Total
Rams	3	0	7	7	17
Black Bears	14	3	7	3	27

=== Richmond ===
	1	2	3	4	Total
Black Bears	7	3	7	0	17
#19 Spiders	14	6	14	14	48

=== Albany ===
	1	2	3	4	Total
Black Bears	20	3	9	7	39
Great Danes	0	7	0	0	7

=== Yale ===
	1	2	3	4	Total
Bulldogs	0	3	6	12	21
Black Bears	0	7	3	0	10

=== Stony Brook ===
	1	2	3	4	Total
Seawolves	0	10	0	0	10
Black Bears	3	0	7	13	23

=== Villanova ===
	1	2	3	4	Total
Black Bears	0	3	0	0	3
Wildcats	6	0	0	7	13

=== Towson ===
	1	2	3	4	Total
Tigers	0	3	7	0	10
Black Bears	0	0	0	7	7

=== Elon ===
	1	2	3	4	Total
Phoenix	7	10	0	10	27
Black Bears	0	0	3	19	22

=== New Hampshire ===
	1	2	3	4	Total
Black Bears	0	0	0	6	6
Wildcats	7	6	6	3	22

== After the season ==
The following Black Bear was selected in the 2016 NFL draft after the season.

Round	Pick	Player	Position	NFL club
7	239	Trevor Bates	Linebacker	Indianapolis Colts
