= 2015 NCAA Division I FCS football season =

American college football season

2015 NCAA Division I FCS season

Regular season
- Number of teams: 125
- Duration: August 29 – November 21
- Payton Award: Eastern Washington wide receiver Cooper Kupp
- Buchanan Award: Norfolk State linebacker Deon King

Playoff
- Duration: November 28 – December 19
- Championship date: January 9, 2016
- Championship site: Toyota Stadium, Frisco, Texas
- Champion: North Dakota State

NCAA Division I FCS football seasons
- «2014 2016»

The 2015 NCAA Division I FCS football season, part of college football in the United States, was organized by the National Collegiate Athletic Association (NCAA) at the Division I Football Championship Subdivision (FCS) level. The season began on August 29, 2015, and concluded with the 2016 NCAA Division I Football Championship Game played on January 9, 2016, at Toyota Stadium in Frisco, Texas. North Dakota State won its fifth consecutive title, defeating Jacksonville State, 37–10.

== Conference changes and new programs ==
School	2014 conference	2015 conference
Charlotte	FCS Independent	C–USA (FBS)
East Tennessee State	Revived program	FCS Independent
Kennesaw State	New program	Big South

In addition, the Mid-Eastern Athletic Conference announced that they would decline their automatic bid for the FCS National Championship playoff from 2015 onwards. The conference's champion will now participate in the Celebration Bowl against the winners of the Southwestern Athletic Conference title game (the SWAC having abstained from the playoff since 1998 due to its conference season not ending until after the draw has been released), serving as the de facto national championship game for HBCUs. MEAC and SWAC teams who do not participate in the Celebration Bowl may still receive at-large bids to the FCS Championship.

== FCS team wins over FBS teams ==
Italics denotes FBS teams.

Date	Visiting team	Home team	Site	Result	Attendance	Ref.
September 4	No. 20 Fordham	Army	Michie Stadium • West Point, New York	37–35	22,523	
September 5	North Dakota	Wyoming	War Memorial Stadium • Laramie, Wyoming	24–13	23,669	
September 5	Portland State	Washington State	Martin Stadium • Pullman, Washington	24–17	24,302	
September 5	No. 16 South Dakota State	Kansas	Memorial Stadium • Lawrence, Kansas	41–38	30,144	
September 19	Furman	UCF	Bright House Networks Stadium • Orlando, Florida	16–15	36,484	
September 26	No. 9 James Madison	SMU	Gerald J. Ford Stadium • University Park, Texas	48–45	22,314	
October 3	No. 18 Liberty	Georgia State	Georgia Dome • Atlanta, Georgia	41–33	17,765	
October 10	No. 25 Portland State	North Texas	Apogee Stadium • Denton, Texas	66–7	19,801	
November 21	No. 25 The Citadel	South Carolina	Williams–Brice Stadium • Columbia, South Carolina (SEC Nation)	23–22	77,241	
^{#}Rankings from STATS poll released prior to the game.

Portland State became the first FCS team to defeat two FBS teams in the same season since the 2007 North Dakota State Bison football team. Additionally, the Vikings' 59 point win over North Texas is the largest margin of victory by an FCS team over an FBS team.

== Conference standings ==
2015 Big Sky Conference football standings
	Conf.			Overall
Team	W		L	W		L
No. 18 Southern Utah $^	7	–	1	8	–	4
No. 10 Portland State ^	6	–	2	9	–	3
No. 14 Montana ^	6	–	2	8	–	5
North Dakota	5	–	3	7	–	4
Northern Arizona	5	–	3	7	–	4
Eastern Washington	5	–	3	6	–	5
Weber State	5	–	3	6	–	5
Northern Colorado	3	–	5	6	–	5
Montana State	3	–	5	5	–	6
Cal Poly	3	–	5	4	–	7
UC Davis	2	–	6	2	–	9
Idaho State	1	–	7	2	–	9
Sacramento State	1	–	7	2	–	9
$ – Conference champion; ^ – FCS playoff participant; Rankings from STATS Poll

2015 Big South Conference football standings
	Conf.			Overall
Team	W		L	W		L
No. 6 Charleston Southern $^	6	–	0	10	–	3
No. 16 Coastal Carolina ^	4	–	2	9	–	3
Liberty	3	–	3	6	–	5
Monmouth	3	–	3	5	–	6
Kennesaw State	2	–	4	6	–	5
Gardner–Webb *	2	–	4	4	–	7
Presbyterian	1	–	5	2	–	9
$ – Conference champion; ^ – FCS playoff participant; * Gardner–Webb ineligible for postseason due to APR violations; Rankings from STATS Poll

2015 Colonial Athletic Association football standings
	Conf.			Overall
Team	W		L	W		L
No. 4 Richmond +^	6	–	2	10	–	4
No. 11 James Madison +^	6	–	2	9	–	3
No. 12 William & Mary +^	6	–	2	9	–	4
Towson	5	–	3	7	–	4
New Hampshire ^	5	–	3	7	–	5
Villanova	5	–	3	6	–	5
Stony Brook	3	–	5	5	–	5
Delaware	3	–	5	4	–	7
Elon	3	–	5	4	–	7
Maine	3	–	5	3	–	8
Albany	2	–	6	3	–	8
Rhode Island	1	–	7	1	–	10
+ – Conference co-champions; ^ – FCS playoff participant; Rankings from STATS Poll

2015 Ivy League football standings
	Conf.			Overall
Team	W		L	W		L
No. 20 Harvard +	6	–	1	9	–	1
No. 23 Dartmouth +	6	–	1	9	–	1
Penn +	6	–	1	7	–	3
Yale	3	–	4	6	–	4
Brown	3	–	4	5	–	5
Princeton	2	–	5	5	–	5
Columbia	1	–	6	2	–	8
Cornell	1	–	6	1	–	9
+ – Conference co-champions; Rankings from STATS Poll

2015 Mid-Eastern Athletic Conference football standings
	Conf.			Overall
Team	W		L	W		L
No. 21 North Carolina A&T +	7	–	1	10	–	2
Bethune–Cookman +	7	–	1	9	–	2
North Carolina Central +	7	–	1	8	–	3
South Carolina State	6	–	2	7	–	4
Hampton	5	–	3	6	–	5
Morgan State	4	–	4	4	–	6
Norfolk State	4	–	4	4	–	7
Savannah State *	1	–	7	1	–	9
Delaware State	1	–	7	1	–	10
Florida A&M *	1	–	7	1	–	10
Howard	1	–	7	1	–	10
+ – Conference co-champions; Florida A&M and Savannah State ineligible for postseason due to APR violations; Rankings from STATS Poll

2015 Missouri Valley Football Conference standings
	Conf.			Overall
Team	W		L	W		L
No. 1 North Dakota State +^	7	–	1	13	–	2
No. 5 Illinois State +^	7	–	1	10	–	3
No. 8 Northern Iowa ^	5	–	3	9	–	5
No. 15 South Dakota State ^	5	–	3	8	–	4
Western Illinois ^	5	–	3	7	–	6
Indiana State	3	–	5	5	–	6
Youngstown State	3	–	5	5	–	6
South Dakota	3	–	5	5	–	6
Southern Illinois	2	–	6	3	–	8
Missouri State	0	–	8	1	–	10
+ – Conference co-champions; ^ – FCS playoff participant; Rankings from STATS Poll

2015 Northeast Conference football standings
	Conf.			Overall
Team	W		L	W		L
Duquesne $^	5	–	1	8	–	4
Saint Francis (PA)	4	–	2	6	–	4
Sacred Heart	3	–	3	6	–	5
Bryant	3	–	3	5	–	6
Central Connecticut	3	–	3	4	–	7
Robert Morris	2	–	4	4	–	7
Wagner	1	–	5	1	–	10
$ – Conference champion; ^ – FCS playoff participant

2015 Ohio Valley Conference football standings
	Conf.			Overall
Team	W		L	W		L
No. 2 Jacksonville State $^	8	–	0	13	–	2
No. 25 Eastern Illinois ^	7	–	1	7	–	5
UT Martin	6	–	2	7	–	4
Eastern Kentucky	5	–	3	6	–	5
SE Missouri State	3	–	4	4	–	7
Tennessee Tech	3	–	5	4	–	7
Murray State	2	–	6	3	–	8
Tennessee State	1	–	6	4	–	6
Austin Peay	0	–	8	0	–	11
$ – Conference champion; ^ – FCS playoff participant; Rankings from STATS Poll

2015 Patriot League football standings
	Conf.			Overall
Team	W		L	W		L
No. 17 Colgate $^	6	–	0	9	–	5
No. 19 Fordham ^	5	–	1	9	–	3
Lehigh	4	–	2	6	–	5
Holy Cross	3	–	3	6	–	5
Georgetown	2	–	4	4	–	7
Bucknell	1	–	5	4	–	7
Lafayette	0	–	6	1	–	10
$ – Conference champion; ^ – FCS playoff participant; Rankings from STATS Poll

2015 Pioneer Football League standings
	Conf.			Overall
Team	W		L	W		L
Dayton +^	7	–	1	10	–	2
San Diego +	7	–	1	9	–	2
Jacksonville *	6	–	2	9	–	2
Morehead State	6	–	2	7	–	4
Butler	4	–	4	6	–	5
Drake	4	–	4	5	–	6
Marist	4	–	4	5	–	6
Campbell	3	–	5	5	–	6
Stetson	1	–	7	3	–	8
Valparaiso	1	–	7	2	–	9
Davidson	1	–	7	2	–	9
+ – Conference co-champions; ^ – FCS playoff participant; * Jacksonville ineligible for PFL title and FCS playoffs due to matters regarding the PFL's financial aid rules

2015 Southern Conference football standings
	Conf.			Overall
Team	W		L	W		L
No. 9 Chattanooga +^	6	–	1	9	–	4
No. 13 The Citadel +^	6	–	1	9	–	4
Western Carolina	5	–	2	7	–	4
Samford	3	–	4	6	–	5
Wofford	3	–	4	5	–	6
Mercer	2	–	5	5	–	6
Furman	2	–	5	4	–	7
VMI	1	–	6	2	–	9
+ – Conference co-champions; ^ – FCS playoff participant; Rankings from STATS Poll

2015 Southland Conference football standings
	Conf.			Overall
Team	W		L	W		L
No. 7 McNeese State $^	9	–	0	10	–	1
No. 3 Sam Houston State ^	7	–	2	11	–	4
Central Arkansas	7	–	2	7	–	4
Incarnate Word *	5	–	4	6	–	5
Lamar	4	–	5	5	–	6
Northwestern State	4	–	5	4	–	7
Stephen F. Austin	4	–	5	4	–	7
SE Louisiana	3	–	6	4	–	7
Abilene Christian *	3	–	6	3	–	8
Nicholls State	3	–	6	3	–	8
Houston Baptist	0	–	8	2	–	9
$ – Conference champion; ^ – FCS playoff participant; * – ineligible for FCS playoffs due to transition from NCAA Division II; Rankings from STATS poll

2015 Southwestern Athletic Conference football standings
	Conf.			Overall
Team	W		L	W		L
East Division
Alcorn State xy$	7	–	2	9	–	4
Alabama State *	5	–	4	6	–	5
Alabama A&M	3	–	6	3	–	8
Jackson State	3	–	6	3	–	8
Mississippi Valley State	1	–	8	1	–	10
West Division
No. 24 Grambling State xy	9	–	0	9	–	3
Prairie View A&M	8	–	1	8	–	2
Southern	6	–	3	6	–	5
Texas Southern	2	–	7	3	–	7
Arkansas–Pine Bluff	1	–	8	2	–	9
Championship: Alcorn State 49, Grambling State 21
$ – Conference champion; x – Division champion/co-champions; y – Championship game participant; * – Ineligible for postseason due to APR violations; Rankings from STATS Poll

2015 NCAA Division I FCS independents football standings
	Conf.			Overall
Team	W		L	W		L
East Tennessee State		–		2	–	9

== Conference summaries ==
=== Championship games ===
Conference	Champion	Runner-up	Score	Offensive Player of the Year	Defensive Player of the Year	Coach of the Year
SWAC	Alcorn State	Grambling State	49–21	Johnathan Williams (Grambling)	Kourtney Berry (Alabama State)	Broderick Fobbs (Grambling)

=== Other conference winners ===
Note: Records are regular-season only, and do not include playoff games.

Conference	Champion	Record	Offensive Player of the Year	Defensive Player of the Year	Coach of the Year
Big Sky	Southern Utah	8–3 (7–1)	Cooper Kupp (Eastern Washington)	James Cowser (Southern Utah)	Bruce Barnum (Portland State)
Big South	Charleston Southern	9–2 (6–0)	De'Angelo Henderson (Coastal Carolina)	Chima Uzowihe (Liberty)	Jamey Chadwell (Charleston Southern)
CAA	James Madison; Richmond; William & Mary	9–2 (6–2); 8–3 (6–2); 8–3 (6–2)	Vad Lee (James Madison)	DeAndre Houston-Carson (William & Mary); Victor Ochi (Stony Brook)	Danny Rocco (Richmond)
Ivy	Dartmouth; Harvard; Penn	9–1 (6–1); 9–1 (6–1); 7–3 (6–1)	Scott Hosch (Harvard)	Tyler Drake (Yale)	Ray Priore (Penn)
MEAC	Bethune-Cookman; North Carolina A&T; North Carolina Central	9–2 (7–1); 9–2 (7–1); 8–3 (7–1)	Tarik Cohen (North Carolina A&T)	Javon Hargrave (South Carolina State)	Terry Sims (Bethune-Cookman)
MVFC	Illinois State; North Dakota State	9–2 (7–1); 9–2 (7–1)	Marshaun Coprich (Illinois State)	Deiondre' Hall (Northern Iowa)	Bob Nielson (Western Illinois)
NEC	Duquesne	8–3 (5–1)	Ricardo McCray (Bryant)	Christian Kuntz (Duquesne)	Chris Villarrial (Saint Francis)
OVC	Jacksonville State	10–1 (8–0)	Eli Jenkins (Jacksonville State)	Dino Fanti (Eastern Illinois); Noah Spence (Eastern Kentucky)	John Grass (Jacksonville State)
Patriot	Colgate	7–4 (6–0)	Chase Edmonds (Fordham)	Clayton Ewell (Bucknell)	Dan Hunt (Colgate)
Pioneer	Dayton; San Diego	10–1 (7–1); 9–2 (7–1)	Austin Gahafer (Morehead State)	Donald Payne (Stetson)	Rick Chamberlin (Dayton)
Southern	Chattanooga; The Citadel	8–3 (6–1); 8–3 (6–1)	Jacob Huesman (Chattanooga)	Mitchell Jeter (The Citadel)	Mike Houston (The Citadel)
Southland	McNeese State	10–0 (9–0)	Kade Harrington (Lamar)	Wallace Scott (McNeese State)	Matt Viator (McNeese State)

== Playoff qualifiers ==
=== Automatic berths for conference champions ===
Conference	Team	Appearance	Last bid	Result
Big Sky Conference	Southern Utah	2nd	2013	First Round (L – Sam Houston State)
Big South Conference	Charleston Southern	1st	–	–
Colonial Athletic Association	Richmond	10th	2014	Second Round (L – Coastal Carolina)
Missouri Valley Football Conference	North Dakota State	6th	2014	National Champions (W – Illinois State)
Northeast Conference	Duquesne	1st	–	–
Ohio Valley Conference	Jacksonville State	6th	2014	Second Round (L – Sam Houston State)
Patriot League	Colgate	10th	2012	First Round (L – Wagner)
Pioneer Football League	Dayton	1st	–	–
Southern Conference	Chattanooga	3rd	2014	Quarterfinals (L – New Hampshire)
Southland Conference	McNeese State	16th	2013	Second Round (L – Jacksonville State)

=== At large qualifiers ===
Conference	Team	Appearance	Last bid	Result
Big Sky Conference	Montana	24th	2014	Second Round (L – Eastern Washington)
Big Sky Conference	Portland State	2nd	2000	First Round (L – Delaware)
Big South Conference	Coastal Carolina	6th	2014	Quarterfinals (L – North Dakota State)
Colonial Athletic Association	James Madison	11th	2014	First Round (L – Liberty)
Colonial Athletic Association	New Hampshire	14th	2014	Semifinals (L – Illinois State)
Colonial Athletic Association	William & Mary	10th	2010	Second Round (L – Georgia Southern)
Mid-Eastern Athletic Conference	None			
Missouri Valley Football Conference	Illinois State	6th	2014	Championship Game (L – North Dakota State)
Missouri Valley Football Conference	Northern Iowa	18th	2014	Second Round (L – Illinois State)
Missouri Valley Football Conference	South Dakota State	5th	2014	Second Round (L – North Dakota State)
Missouri Valley Football Conference	Western Illinois	10th	2010	Second Round (L – Appalachian State)
Northeast Conference	None			
Ohio Valley Conference	Eastern Illinois	16th	2013	Quarterfinals (L – Towson)
Patriot League	Fordham	5th	2014	Second Round (L – New Hampshire)
Pioneer Football League	None			
Southern Conference	The Citadel	4th	1992	Quarterfinals (L – Youngstown State)
Southland Conference	Sam Houston State	9th	2014	Semifinals (L – North Dakota State)
Southwestern Athletic Conference	None			

=== Abstentions ===
- Ivy League – Dartmouth, Harvard, Penn
- Mid-Eastern Athletic Conference – North Carolina A&T
- Southwestern Athletic Conference – Alcorn State

== Postseason ==
=== Bowl game ===
Game	Date/TV	Location	Winning Team	Losing Team	Score	Offensive MVP	Defensive MVP
Celebration Bowl	December 19; ABC	Georgia Dome; Atlanta, Georgia	North Carolina A&T; 10–2 (7–1)	Alcorn State Braves; 9–4 (7–2)	41–34	Tarik Cohen (RB, North Carolina A&T)	Denzel Jones (LB, North Carolina A&T)

=== NCAA Division I playoff bracket ===
First Round; November 28; Campus sites
Chattanooga*	50
Fordham	20
Coastal Carolina*	38
The Citadel	41
Sam Houston State*	42
Southern Utah	39
New Hampshire*	20
Colgate	27
Dayton*	7
Western Illinois	24
William & Mary*	52
Duquesne	49
Montana*	24
South Dakota State	17
Northern Iowa*	53
Eastern Illinois	17

Second Round; December 5 Campus sites
1	Jacksonville State*	41†
Chattanooga	35
8	Charleston Southern*	14
The Citadel	6
4	McNeese State*	29
Sam Houston State	34
5	James Madison*	38
Colgate	44
2	Illinois State*	36
Western Illinois	19
7	Richmond*	48
William & Mary	13
3	North Dakota State*	37
Montana	6
6	Portland State*	17
Northern Iowa	29

Quarterfinals; December 11 and 12; Campus sites
1	Jacksonville State*	58
8	Charleston Southern	38
Sam Houston State*	48
Colgate	21
2	Illinois State*	27
7	Richmond	39
3	North Dakota State*	23
Northern Iowa	13

Semifinals; December 18 and 19; Campus sites
1	Jacksonville State*	62
Sam Houston State	10
7	Richmond	7
3	North Dakota State*	33

National Championship; January 9 Toyota Stadium, Frisco, Texas
1	Jacksonville State	10
3	North Dakota State	37

* Home team
† Overtime
Winner

== Updated stadiums ==
Home facilities for the two new FCS programs in the 2015 season:

- East Tennessee State played at Kermit Tipton Stadium, located on the campus of Science Hill High School in Johnson City, Tennessee.
- Kennesaw State played on campus at Fifth Third Bank Stadium, capacity 8,318 (planned expansion to over 10,000).

== Coaching changes ==
=== Preseason and in-season ===
This is restricted to coaching changes that took place on or after May 1, 2015. For coaching changes that occurred earlier in 2015, see 2014 NCAA Division I FCS end-of-season coaching changes.

School	Outgoing coach	Date	Reason	Replacement
Jackson State	Harold Jackson	October 7	Fired	Derrick McCall (interim); Tony Hughes

=== End of season ===
School	Outgoing coach	Date announced	Reason	Replacement
South Dakota	Joe Glenn	November 22	Retired	Bob Nielson
Austin Peay	Kirby Cannon	November 23	Fired	Will Healy
Montana State	Rob Ash	November 23	Fired	Jeff Choate
Eastern Kentucky	Dean Hood	November 23	Fired	Mark Elder
Maine	Jack Cosgrove	November 24	Transferred to Senior Associate Director of Athletics for UMaine	Joe Harasymiak
Texas Southern	Darrell Asberry	November 29	Resigned	Michael Haywood
Southern Illinois	Dale Lennon	November 30	Fired	Nick Hill
Tennessee Tech	Watson Brown	December 2	Retired	Marcus Satterfield
Jacksonville	Kerwin Bell	December 3	Fired	Ian Shields
Fordham	Joe Moorhead	December 12	Hired as offensive coordinator by Penn State	Andrew Breiner
McNeese State	Matt Viator	December 14	Hired as head coach by Louisiana–Monroe	Lance Guidry
Western Illinois	Bob Nielson	December 16	Hired as head coach by South Dakota	Charlie Fisher
Southern Utah	Ed Lamb	December 26	Hired as assistant head coach by BYU	Demario Warren
James Madison	Everett Withers	January 7	Hired as head coach by Texas State	Mike Houston
The Citadel	Mike Houston	January 18	Hired as head coach by James Madison	Brent Thompson
Morgan State	Lee Hull	February 8, 2016	Resigned	Fred Farrier (interim)

== See also ==
- 2015 NCAA Division I FCS football rankings
- 2015 NCAA Division I FBS football season
- 2015 NCAA Division II football season
- 2015 NCAA Division III football season
