= 2015 William & Mary Tribe football team =

American college football season

2015 William & Mary Tribe football

CAA co-champion

NCAA Division I Second Round, L 13–48 vs. Richmond
- Conference: Colonial Athletic Association

Ranking
- STATS: No. 12
- FCS Coaches: No. 12
- Record: 9–4 (6–2 CAA)
- Head coach: Jimmye Laycock (36th season)
- Offensive coordinator: Kevin Rogers (3rd season)
- Defensive coordinator: Trevor Andrews (2nd season)
- Captains: Mikal Abdul-Saboor; DeAndre Houston-Carson; Andrew Jones; Luke Rhodes
- Home stadium: Zable Stadium

2015 Colonial Athletic Association football standings
	Conf.			Overall
Team	W		L	W		L
No. 4 Richmond +^	6	–	2	10	–	4
No. 11 James Madison +^	6	–	2	9	–	3
No. 12 William & Mary +^	6	–	2	9	–	4
Towson	5	–	3	7	–	4
New Hampshire ^	5	–	3	7	–	5
Villanova	5	–	3	6	–	5
Stony Brook	3	–	5	5	–	5
Delaware	3	–	5	4	–	7
Elon	3	–	5	4	–	7
Maine	3	–	5	3	–	8
Albany	2	–	6	3	–	8
Rhode Island	1	–	7	1	–	10
+ – Conference co-champions; ^ – FCS playoff participant; Rankings from STATS Poll

The 2015 William & Mary Tribe football team represented the College of William & Mary as a member of the Colonial Athletic Association (CAA) in the 2015 NCAA Division I FCS football season. The Tribe were led by 36th-year head coach Jimmye Laycock and played their home games at Zable Stadium. William & Mary returned to an 11-game regular season schedule after playing 12 games the previous two seasons. The Tribe shared the CAA title with James Madison and Richmond; all three teams finished with identical 6–2 conference records. William & Mary received an at-large bid to the FCS playoffs, where they defeated Duquesne in the first round before losing in the second round to Richmond.

Following the 2015 season, Zable Stadium underwent a significant renovation and expansion.

== Schedule ==
Date	Time	Opponent	Rank	Site	TV	Result	Attendance
September 5	6:00 pm	at Lafayette*		Fisher Stadium; Easton, PA	ESPN3	W 34–7	7,647
September 19	3:00 pm	at Virginia*		Scott Stadium; Charlottesville, VA	ESPN3	L 29–35	41,881
September 26	7:30 pm	Stony Brook		Zable Stadium; Williamsburg, VA	CSN	W 21–0	8,362
October 3	7:30 pm	at Delaware	No. 25	Delaware Stadium; Newark, DE (rivalry)	NBCSN	L 23–24	12,437
October 10	12:00 pm	at No. 14 Villanova		Villanova Stadium; Villanova, PA	CSN	W 38–16	5,809
October 17	12:00 pm	No. 19 New Hampshire	No. 24	Zable Stadium; Williamsburg, VA	CSN	W 34–18	10,180
October 24	3:30 pm	Hampton*^{†}	No. 17	Zable Stadium; Williamsburg, VA	TATV	W 40–7	11,736
October 31	4:00 pm	No. 9 James Madison	No. 16	Zable Stadium; Williamsburg, VA (rivalry)	NBCSN	W 44–41	9,414
November 7	12:00 pm	at Elon	No. 12	Rhodes Stadium; Elon, NC	CSN	W 34–13	11,250
November 14	1:30 pm	Towson	No. 7	Zable Stadium; Williamsburg, VA	TATV	W 31–17	9,715
November 21	12:00 pm	at No. 14 Richmond	No. 7	E. Claiborne Robins Stadium; Richmond, VA (Capital Cup)	CSN	L 9–20	8,700
November 28	3:30 pm	Duquesne*	No. 13	Zable Stadium; Williamsburg, VA (NCAA Division I FCS First Round)	ESPN3	W 52–49	4,395
December 5	12:00 pm	at No. 12 Richmond*	No. 13	E. Claiborne Robins Stadium; Richmond, VA (NCAA Division I FCS Second Round)	ESPN3	L 13–48	7,277
*Non-conference game; ^{†}Homecoming; Rankings from STATS Poll released prior to the game; All times are in Eastern time

== Rankings ==
Ranking movements Legend: ██ Increase in ranking ██ Decrease in ranking RV = Received votes т = Tied with team above or below
	Week													
Poll	Pre	1	2	3	4	5	6	7	8	9	10	11	12	Final
STATS FCS	RV	RV	RV	RV	25	RV	24	17	16	12	7	7	12	12
Coaches	RV	25–T	RV	25	22	RV	24–T	16	15	12	7	7	12	12
