= 2015 Stony Brook Seawolves football team =

American college football season

2015 Stony Brook Seawolves football
- Conference: Colonial Athletic Association
- Record: 5–5 (3–5 CAA)
- Head coach: Chuck Priore (10th season)
- Offensive coordinator: Jeff Behrman (10th season)
- Defensive coordinator: Lyle Hemphill (3rd season)
- Home stadium: Kenneth P. LaValle Stadium

2015 Colonial Athletic Association football standings
	Conf.			Overall
Team	W		L	W		L
No. 4 Richmond +^	6	–	2	10	–	4
No. 11 James Madison +^	6	–	2	9	–	3
No. 12 William & Mary +^	6	–	2	9	–	4
Towson	5	–	3	7	–	4
New Hampshire ^	5	–	3	7	–	5
Villanova	5	–	3	6	–	5
Stony Brook	3	–	5	5	–	5
Delaware	3	–	5	4	–	7
Elon	3	–	5	4	–	7
Maine	3	–	5	3	–	8
Albany	2	–	6	3	–	8
Rhode Island	1	–	7	1	–	10
+ – Conference co-champions; ^ – FCS playoff participant; Rankings from STATS Poll

The 2015 Stony Brook Seawolves football team represented Stony Brook University in the 2015 NCAA Division I FCS football season. The Seawolves competed as third year members of the Colonial Athletic Association with Chuck Priore as the head coach for his tenth season. They played their home games at Kenneth P. LaValle Stadium in Stony Brook, New York. They finished the season 5–5, 3–5 in CAA play to finish in a four-way tie for seventh place.

== Schedule ==
Date	Time	Opponent	Site	TV	Result	Attendance
September 3	7:00 pm	Toledo*	Glass Bowl; Toledo, OH	ESPN3	Canceled^{[a]}	
September 12	6:00 pm	Central Connecticut*	Kenneth P. LaValle Stadium; Stony Brook, NY		W 38–9	6,513
September 19	7:00 pm	No. 13 New Hampshire	Kenneth P. LaValle Stadium; Stony Brook, NY	ASN, NESN+	W 31–6	7,072
September 26	7:30 pm	at William & Mary	Zable Stadium; Williamsburg, VA	CSN, SNY	L 0–21	8,362
October 3	12:00 pm	at No. 6 James Madison	Bridgeforth Stadium; Harrisonburg, VA	CSN, SNY	L 20–38	21,653
October 17	6:00 pm	Towson^{†}	Kenneth P. LaValle Stadium; Stony Brook, NY		L 14–21	12,177
October 24	12:30 pm	at Maine	Alfond Stadium; Orono, ME	FCS	L 10–23	4,144
October 31	12:00 pm	Elon	Kenneth P. LaValle Stadium; Stony Brook, NY	ASN	L 7–21	5,578
November 7	1:00 pm	Howard*	Kenneth P. LaValle Stadium; Stony Brook, NY		W 14–9	5,109
November 14	12:30 pm	at Rhode Island	Meade Stadium; Kingston, RI		W 19–7	2,643
November 21	1:00 pm	Albany	Kenneth P. LaValle Stadium; Stony Brook, NY (rivalry)		W 20–2	7,158
*Non-conference game; ^{†}Homecoming; Rankings from STATS Poll released prior to the game; All times are in Eastern time

- Source: Schedule

^{^[a]}The game was delayed due to thunderstorms at 7:51 PM, and resumed at around 9:50 PM. It was halted again just before the start of the second half and was then suspended at around 12:13 AM. Toledo was leading Stony Brook 16–7 prior to the game being suspended. Toledo wanted to resume the game the next day, but Stony Brook feared its players would not have been able to get home at a reasonable hour. As there was no room to make the game up later in the season, it was officially declared "no contest."

== Game summaries ==
=== At Toledo ===
	1	2	3	4	Total
Seawolves					0
Rockets					0

This game was suspended just before the start of the second half due to thunderstorms. It had been delayed three times due to lightning. The Rockets wanted to finish the game the next day, but this would have forced Stony Brook to miss its chartered flight and take an 11-hour bus ride back to Long Island. Stony Brook officials felt this was an unacceptable risk to their players' safety. There was no room in the schedule to finish the game, and it was officially declared "no contest."

=== Central Connecticut ===
	1	2	3	4	Total
Blue Devils	6	0	0	3	9
Seawolves	7	10	14	7	38

=== New Hampshire ===
	1	2	3	4	Total
#13 Wildcats	0	6	0	0	6
Seawolves	7	10	14	0	31

=== William & Mary ===
	1	2	3	4	Total
Seawolves	0	0	0	0	0
Tribe	7	7	0	7	21

=== At James Madison ===
	1	2	3	4	Total
Seawolves	7	0	0	13	20
#6 Dukes	21	7	10	0	38

=== Towson ===
	1	2	3	4	Total
Tigers	0	7	7	7	21
Seawolves	14	0	0	0	14

=== At Maine ===
	1	2	3	4	Total
Seawolves	0	10	0	0	10
Black Bears	3	0	7	13	23

=== Elon ===
	1	2	3	4	Total
Phoenix	7	0	0	14	21
Seawolves	0	0	7	0	7

=== Howard ===
	1	2	3	4	Total
Bison	3	0	0	6	9
Seawolves	0	7	7	0	14

=== At Rhode Island ===
	1	2	3	4	Total
Seawolves	9	3	7	0	19
Rams	0	7	0	0	7

=== Albany ===
	1	2	3	4	Total
Great Danes	0	0	2	0	2
Seawolves	7	6	7	0	20
