= 2015 New Hampshire Wildcats football team =

American college football season

2015 New Hampshire Wildcats football

FCS Playoffs First Round vs. Colgate, L 20–27
- Conference: Colonial Athletic Association
- Record: 7–5 (5–3 CAA)
- Head coach: Sean McDonnell (17th season)
- Offensive coordinator: Ryan Carty (8th season)
- Defensive coordinator: John Lyons (4th season)
- Home stadium: Cowell Stadium

2015 Colonial Athletic Association football standings
	Conf.			Overall
Team	W		L	W		L
No. 4 Richmond +^	6	–	2	10	–	4
No. 11 James Madison +^	6	–	2	9	–	3
No. 12 William & Mary +^	6	–	2	9	–	4
Towson	5	–	3	7	–	4
New Hampshire ^	5	–	3	7	–	5
Villanova	5	–	3	6	–	5
Stony Brook	3	–	5	5	–	5
Delaware	3	–	5	4	–	7
Elon	3	–	5	4	–	7
Maine	3	–	5	3	–	8
Albany	2	–	6	3	–	8
Rhode Island	1	–	7	1	–	10
+ – Conference co-champions; ^ – FCS playoff participant; Rankings from STATS Poll

The 2015 New Hampshire Wildcats football team represented the University of New Hampshire in the 2015 NCAA Division I FCS football season. They were led by 17th-year head coach Sean McDonnell and played their home games at Cowell Stadium. They were a member of the Colonial Athletic Association. They finished the season 7–5, 5–3 in CAA play to finish in a three-way tie for fourth place. They received an at-large bid to the FCS Playoffs where they lost in the first round to Colgate.

== Schedule ==
Date	Time	Opponent	Rank	Site	TV	Result	Attendance
September 3	10:00 pm	at San Jose State*	No. 9	Spartan Stadium; San Jose, CA		L 13–43	15,198
September 12	6:00 pm	at Colgate*	No. 12	Crown Field at Andy Kerr Stadium; Hamilton, NY		W 26–8	2,988
September 19	7:00 pm	at Stony Brook	No. 13	Kenneth P. LaValle Stadium; Stony Brook, NY	ASN	L 6–31	7,072
September 26	6:00 pm	Central Connecticut*	No. 21	Cowell Stadium; Durham, NH	UNHTV	W 57–14	6,215
October 3	3:30 pm	Elon^{†}	No. 20	Cowell Stadium; Durham, NH	ASN	W 37–14	16,713
October 17	12:00 pm	at No. 24 William & Mary	No. 19	Zable Stadium; Williamsburg, VA	CSN	L 18–34	10,180
October 24	3:30 pm	at Delaware		Delaware Stadium; Newark, DE		L 14–31	19,924
October 31	1:00 pm	Rhode Island		Cowell Stadium; Durham, NH	UNHTV	W 20–17	5,003
November 7	3:00 pm	No. 5 Richmond		Cowell Stadium; Durham, NH	NBCSN	W 30–25	4,992
November 14	7:00 pm	at Albany		Bob Ford Field at Tom & Mary Casey Stadium; Albany, NY	ASN	W 24–14	3,814
November 21	1:00 pm	Maine		Cowell Stadium; Durham, NH (Battle for the Brice–Cowell Musket)	UNHTV	W 22–6	7,594
November 28	3:30 pm	Colgate*		Cowell Stadium; Durham, NH (NCAA Division I First Round)	ESPN3	L 20–27	3,303
*Non-conference game; ^{†}Homecoming; Rankings from STATS Poll released prior to the game; All times are in Eastern time

== Game summaries ==
=== At San Jose State ===
	1	2	3	4	Total
#9 Wildcats	0	7	0	6	13
Spartans	20	6	10	7	43

=== At Colgate ===
	1	2	3	4	Total
#12 Wildcats	7	13	3	3	26
Raiders	0	0	0	8	8

=== At Stony Brook ===
	1	2	3	4	Total
#13 Wildcats	0	6	0	0	6
Seawolves	7	10	14	0	31

=== Central Connecticut ===
	1	2	3	4	Total
Blue Devils	0	7	7	0	14
#21 Wildcats	25	21	8	3	57

=== Elon ===
	1	2	3	4	Total
Phoenix	0	7	7	0	14
#20 Wildcats	20	14	3	0	37

=== At William & Mary ===
	1	2	3	4	Total
#19 Wildcats	7	8	0	3	18
#24 Tribe	7	14	6	7	34

=== At Delaware ===
	1	2	3	4	Total
Wildcats	7	7	0	0	14
Fightin' Blue Hens	6	0	18	7	31

=== Rhode Island ===
	1	2	3	4	Total
Rams	3	14	0	0	17
Wildcats	0	0	14	6	20

=== Richmond ===
	1	2	3	4	Total
#5 Spiders	7	0	15	3	25
Wildcats	14	7	6	3	30

=== At Albany ===
	1	2	3	4	Total
Wildcats	10	0	7	7	24
Great Danes	0	0	7	7	14

=== Maine ===
	1	2	3	4	Total
Black Bears	0	0	0	6	6
Wildcats	7	6	6	3	22

=== Colgate—NCAA Division I First Round ===
	1	2	3	4	Total
Raiders	6	6	8	7	27
Wildcats	0	6	0	14	20

== Ranking movements ==
Ranking movements Legend: ██ Increase in ranking ██ Decrease in ranking — = Not ranked RV = Received votes
	Week													
Poll	Pre	1	2	3	4	5	6	7	8	9	10	11	12	Final
STATS FCS	9	12	13	21	20	21	19	RV	RV	RV	RV	RV	RV	RV
Coaches	7	15	13	24	23	22	20	RV	RV	—	—	RV	RV	RV
