= 2015 Albany Great Danes football team =

American college football season

2015 Albany Great Danes football
- Conference: Colonial Athletic Association
- Record: 3–8 (2–6 CAA)
- Head coach: Greg Gattuso (2nd season)
- Offensive coordinator: Joe Bernard (2nd season)
- Defensive coordinator: Bob Benson (2nd season)
- Home stadium: Bob Ford Field at Tom & Mary Casey Stadium

2015 Colonial Athletic Association football standings
	Conf.			Overall
Team	W		L	W		L
No. 4 Richmond +^	6	–	2	10	–	4
No. 11 James Madison +^	6	–	2	9	–	3
No. 12 William & Mary +^	6	–	2	9	–	4
Towson	5	–	3	7	–	4
New Hampshire ^	5	–	3	7	–	5
Villanova	5	–	3	6	–	5
Stony Brook	3	–	5	5	–	5
Delaware	3	–	5	4	–	7
Elon	3	–	5	4	–	7
Maine	3	–	5	3	–	8
Albany	2	–	6	3	–	8
Rhode Island	1	–	7	1	–	10
+ – Conference co-champions; ^ – FCS playoff participant; Rankings from STATS Poll

The 2015 Albany Great Danes football team represented the University at Albany, SUNY as a member of the Colonial Athletic Association (CAA) during the 2015 NCAA Division I FCS football season. Led by second-year head coach Greg Gattuso, the Great Danes compiled an overall record of 3–8 with a mark of 2–6 in conference play, placing 11th in the CAA. The team played home games at Bob Ford Field at Tom & Mary Casey Stadium in Albany, New York.

== Schedule ==
Date	Time	Opponent	Site	TV	Result	Attendance
September 5	3:30 pm	at Buffalo*	University at Buffalo Stadium; Amherst, NY	ESPN3	L 14–51	20,872
September 12	3:30 pm	Rhode Island	Bob Ford Field at Tom & Mary Casey Stadium; Albany, NY	ASN	W 35–7	6,081
September 19	3:00 pm	at No. 12 James Madison	Bridgeforth Stadium; Harrisonburg, VA	CSN	L 28–42	18,659
September 26	3:30 pm	Duquesne*	Bob Ford Field at Tom & Mary Casey Stadium; Albany, NY	DZ	W 17–14	6,227
October 3	1:00 pm	at Holy Cross*	Fitton Field; Worcester, MA	PLL	L 0–37	3,841
October 10	3:30 pm	Maine^{†}	Bob Ford Field at Tom & Mary Casey Stadium; Albany, NY	DZ	L 7–39	8,500
October 17	3:30 pm	No. 25 Villanova	Bob Ford Field at Tom & Mary Casey Stadium; Albany, NY	ASN	L 0–37	8,500
October 31	3:30 pm	at No. 6 Richmond	E. Claiborne Robins Stadium; Richmond, VA		L 31–38	8,475
November 7	12:00 pm	at Delaware	Delaware Stadium; Newark, DE	HAA	W 17–6	15,318
November 14	7:00 pm	New Hampshire	Bob Ford Field at Tom & Mary Casey Stadium; Albany, NY	ASN	L 14–24	3,814
November 21	1:00 pm	at Stony Brook	Kenneth P. LaValle Stadium; Stony Brook, NY (rivalry)		L 2–20	7,158
*Non-conference game; ^{†}Homecoming; Rankings from STATS Poll released prior to the game; All times are in Eastern time
