= 2015 Villanova Wildcats football team =

American college football season

2015 Villanova Wildcats football
- Conference: Colonial Athletic Association
- Record: 6–5 (5–3 CAA)
- Head coach: Andy Talley (31st season)
- Offensive coordinator: Sam Venuto (17th season)
- Offensive scheme: Multiple spread
- Defensive coordinator: Billy Crocker (4th season)
- Base defense: 3–3–5
- Home stadium: Villanova Stadium

2015 Colonial Athletic Association football standings
	Conf.			Overall
Team	W		L	W		L
No. 4 Richmond +^	6	–	2	10	–	4
No. 11 James Madison +^	6	–	2	9	–	3
No. 12 William & Mary +^	6	–	2	9	–	4
Towson	5	–	3	7	–	4
New Hampshire ^	5	–	3	7	–	5
Villanova	5	–	3	6	–	5
Stony Brook	3	–	5	5	–	5
Delaware	3	–	5	4	–	7
Elon	3	–	5	4	–	7
Maine	3	–	5	3	–	8
Albany	2	–	6	3	–	8
Rhode Island	1	–	7	1	–	10
+ – Conference co-champions; ^ – FCS playoff participant; Rankings from STATS Poll

The 2015 Villanova Wildcats football team represented Villanova University in the 2015 NCAA Division I FCS football season. They were led by 31st-year head coach Andy Talley and played their home games at Villanova Stadium. They were a member of the Colonial Athletic Association. They finished the season 6–5, 5–3 in CAA play to finish in a three-way tie for fourth place.

== Schedule ==
Date	Time	Opponent	Rank	Site	TV	Result	Attendance
September 3	7:30 pm	at UConn*	No. 4	Rentschler Field; East Hartford, CT	SNY/ESPN3	L 15–20	26,113
September 12	6:00 pm	at No. 16 Fordham*	No. 6	Coffey Field; Bronx, NY	PLL	W 14–7	6,586
September 19	12:00 pm	Delaware	No. 6	Villanova Stadium; Villanova, PA (Battle of the Blue)	CSN	W 28–21	11,779
September 24	7:00 pm	Penn*	No. 5	Villanova Stadium; Villanova, PA	NNAA	L 13–24	5,727
October 10	12:00 pm	William & Mary	No. 14	Villanova Stadium; Villanova, PA	CSN	L 16–38	5,809
October 17	3:30 pm	at Albany	No. 25	Bob Ford Field at Tom & Mary Casey Stadium; Albany, NY	ASN	W 37–0	8,500
October 24	7:00 pm	at Towson	No. 23	Johnny Unitas Stadium; Towson, MD	ASN	L 21–28	7,387
October 31	7:30 pm	Maine		Villanova Stadium; Villanova, PA	NBCSN	W 13–3	4,309
November 7	12:30 pm	at Rhode Island		Meade Stadium; Kingston, RI		W 24–3	6,122
November 14	3:30 pm	No. 9 Richmond		Villanova Stadium; Villanova, PA	NNAA	W 21–20	6,211
November 21	12:00 pm	at No. 12 James Madison		Bridgeforth Stadium; Harrisonburg, VA	CSN	L 29–38	17,028
*Non-conference game; Rankings from STATS Poll released prior to the game; All times are in Eastern time

== Game summaries ==
=== At UConn ===
	1	2	3	4	Total
#4 Wildcats	0	9	0	6	15
Huskies	6	0	7	7	20

=== At Fordham ===
	1	2	3	4	Total
#6 Wildcats	7	7	0	0	14
#16 Rams	0	7	0	0	7

=== Delaware ===
	1	2	3	4	Total
Fightin' Blue Hens	10	3	0	8	21
#6 Wildcats	7	7	0	14	28

=== Penn ===
	1	2	3	4	Total
Quakers	7	7	3	7	24
#5 Wildcats	0	0	7	6	13

=== William & Mary ===
	1	2	3	4	Total
Tribe	3	28	0	7	38
#14 Wildcats	10	0	0	6	16

=== At Albany ===
	1	2	3	4	Total
#25 Wildcats	10	0	14	13	37
Great Danes	0	0	0	0	0

=== At Towson ===
	1	2	3	4	Total
#23 Wildcats	0	7	7	7	21
Tigers	12	0	6	10	28

=== Maine ===
	1	2	3	4	Total
Black Bears	0	3	0	0	3
Wildcats	6	0	0	7	13

=== At Rhode Island ===
	1	2	3	4	Total
Wildcats	7	0	7	10	24
Rams	0	3	0	0	3

=== Richmond ===
	1	2	3	4	Total
#9 Spiders	0	7	7	6	20
Wildcats	0	7	7	7	21

=== At James Madison ===
	1	2	3	4	Total
Wildcats	7	0	7	15	29
#12 Dukes	14	7	3	14	38

== Ranking movements ==
Ranking movements Legend: ██ Increase in ranking ██ Decrease in ranking — = Not ranked RV = Received votes т = Tied with team above or below ( ) = First-place votes
	Week													
Poll	Pre	1	2	3	4	5	6	7	8	9	10	11	12	Final
STATS FCS	4	6 (6)	6 (4)	5 (4)	14	14	25	23	RV	RV	RV	RV	RV	
Coaches	3	2–T	3	4	17	16	24–T	22	RV	RV	RV	RV	—	
