= 2015 Towson Tigers football team =

American college football season

2015 Towson Tigers football
- Conference: Colonial Athletic Association
- Record: 7–4 (5–3 CAA)
- Head coach: Rob Ambrose (7th season)
- Offensive coordinator: Jared Ambrose (4th season)
- Defensive coordinator: Matt Hachmann (6th season)
- Home stadium: Johnny Unitas Stadium

2015 Colonial Athletic Association football standings
| | Conf. | | | Overall |
| Team | W | | L | W | | L |
|---|---|---|---|---|---|---|
| No. 4 Richmond +^ | 6 | – | 2 | 10 | – | 4 |
| No. 11 James Madison +^ | 6 | – | 2 | 9 | – | 3 |
| No. 12 William & Mary +^ | 6 | – | 2 | 9 | – | 4 |
| Towson | 5 | – | 3 | 7 | – | 4 |
| New Hampshire ^ | 5 | – | 3 | 7 | – | 5 |
| Villanova | 5 | – | 3 | 6 | – | 5 |
| Stony Brook | 3 | – | 5 | 5 | – | 5 |
| Delaware | 3 | – | 5 | 4 | – | 7 |
| Elon | 3 | – | 5 | 4 | – | 7 |
| Maine | 3 | – | 5 | 3 | – | 8 |
| Albany | 2 | – | 6 | 3 | – | 8 |
| Rhode Island | 1 | – | 7 | 1 | – | 10 |
+ – Conference co-champions; ^ – FCS playoff participant; Rankings from STATS Poll

The 2015 Towson Tigers football team represented Towson University in the 2015 NCAA Division I FCS football season. They were led by seventh-year head coach Rob Ambrose and played their home games at Johnny Unitas Stadium. They were a member of the Colonial Athletic Association. They finished the season 7–4, 5–3 in CAA play to finish in a three-way tie for fourth place.

== Schedule ==
| Date | Time | Opponent | Site | TV | Result | Attendance |
|---|---|---|---|---|---|---|
| September 5 | 6:00 pm | at East Carolina* | Dowdy–Ficklen Stadium; Greenville, NC | ESPN3 | L 20–28 | 40,712 |
| September 12 | 6:00 pm | Saint Francis (PA)* | Johnny Unitas Stadium; Towson, MD | TSN | W 35–20 | 7,911 |
| September 19 | 6:00 pm | Holy Cross* | Johnny Unitas Stadium; Towson, MD | TSN | W 29–26 | 5,682 |
| September 26 | 3:00 pm | at Elon | Rhodes Stadium; Elon, NC | PAA | L 13–17 | 8,027 |
| October 10 | 3:00 pm | No. 5 James Madison | Johnny Unitas Stadium; Towson, MD | CSN | L 30–51 | 8,224 |
| October 17 | 6:00 pm | at Stony Brook | Kenneth P. LaValle Stadium; Stony Brook, NY | | W 21–14 | 12,177 |
| October 24 | 7:00 pm | No. 23 Villanova^{†} | Johnny Unitas Stadium; Towson, MD | ASN | W 28–21 | 7,387 |
| October 31 | 4:00 pm | Delaware | Johnny Unitas Stadium; Towson, MD | TSN | W 19–0 | 5,234 |
| November 7 | 7:00 pm | at Maine | Alfond Stadium; Orono, ME | ASN | W 10–7 | 3,196 |
| November 14 | 1:30 pm | at No. 7 William & Mary | Zable Stadium; Williamsburg, VA | | L 17–31 | 9,715 |
| November 21 | 2:00 pm | Rhode Island | Johnny Unitas Stadium; Towson, MD | | W 38–21 | 5,128 |
*Non-conference game; ^{†}Homecoming; Rankings from STATS Poll released prior to the game; All times are in Eastern time
