= 2015 Richmond Spiders football team =

American college football season

2015 Richmond Spiders football

CAA co-champion

FCS Playoffs Semifinal, L 7–33 vs. North Dakota State
- Conference: Colonial Athletic Association

Ranking
- STATS: No. 4
- FCS Coaches: No. 3
- Record: 10–4 (6–2 CAA)
- Head coach: Danny Rocco (4th season)
- Offensive coordinator: Charlie Fisher (1st season)
- Defensive coordinator: Bob Trott (6th season)
- Home stadium: E. Claiborne Robins Stadium

2015 Colonial Athletic Association football standings
	Conf.			Overall
Team	W		L	W		L
No. 4 Richmond +^	6	–	2	10	–	4
No. 11 James Madison +^	6	–	2	9	–	3
No. 12 William & Mary +^	6	–	2	9	–	4
Towson	5	–	3	7	–	4
New Hampshire ^	5	–	3	7	–	5
Villanova	5	–	3	6	–	5
Stony Brook	3	–	5	5	–	5
Delaware	3	–	5	4	–	7
Elon	3	–	5	4	–	7
Maine	3	–	5	3	–	8
Albany	2	–	6	3	–	8
Rhode Island	1	–	7	1	–	10
+ – Conference co-champions; ^ – FCS playoff participant; Rankings from STATS Poll

The 2015 Richmond Spiders football team represented the University of Richmond in the 2015 NCAA Division I FCS football season. They were led by fourth-year head coach Danny Rocco and played their home games at E. Claiborne Robins Stadium. The Spiders were a member of the Colonial Athletic Association (CAA). The Spiders finished as a CAA co-champion along with James Madison and William & Mary, who all finished with identical 6–2 conference records. The Spiders received the CAA's automatic bid to the FCS playoffs by virtue of a head-to-head tiebreaker, having defeated both James Madison and William & Mary during the regular season. After receiving a first-round bye and defeating William & Mary in the second round and Illinois State in the quarterfinals, the Spiders lost to North Dakota State in the semifinals, 33–7.

== Schedule ==
Date	Time	Opponent	Rank	Site	TV	Result	Attendance
September 5	noon	at Maryland*	No. 18	Byrd Stadium; College Park, MD	ESPNU	L 21–50	38,117
September 12	noon	at Hampton*	No. 22	Armstrong Stadium; Hampton, VA		W 31–28	3,515
September 19	6:00 pm	VMI*	No. 22	Robins Stadium; Richmond, VA (rivalry)	CSN MA+	W 42–10	8,700
October 3	3:30 pm	Maine	No. 19	Robins Stadium; Richmond, VA	CSN MA+	W 48–17	7,228
October 10	3:30 pm	Elon	No. 16	Robins Stadium; Richmond, VA	STV	W 27–14	8,216
October 17	noon	at Rhode Island	No. 13	Meade Stadium; Kingston, RI		W 37–12	6,143
October 24	3:30 pm	at No. 4 James Madison	No. 11	Bridgeforth Stadium; Harrisonburg, VA (College GameDay, rivalry)	CSN	W 59–49	26,069
October 31	3:30 pm	Albany^{†}	No. 6	Robins Stadium; Richmond, VA	STV	W 38–31	8,475
November 7	7:00 pm	at New Hampshire	No. 5	Cowell Stadium; Durham, NH	NBCSN	L 25–30	4,992
November 14	3:30 pm	at Villanova	No. 9	Villanova Stadium; Villanova, PA		L 20–21	6,211
November 21	noon	No. 7 William & Mary	No. 14	Robins Stadium; Richmond, VA (Capital Cup)	CSN	W 20–9	8,700
December 5	noon	No. 13 William & Mary*	No. 12	Robins Stadium; Richmond, VA (FCS Playoffs Second Round)	ESPN3	W 48–13	7,277
December 11	7:30 pm	at No. 4 Illinois State*	No. 12	Hancock Stadium; Normal, IL (FCS Playoffs Quarterfinals)	ESPN3	W 39–27	5,356
December 18	8:00 pm	at No. 2 North Dakota State*	No. 12	Fargodome; Fargo, ND (FCS Playoffs Semifinals)	ESPN2	L 7–33	18,105
*Non-conference game; ^{†}Homecoming; Rankings from STATS Poll released prior to the game; All times are in Eastern time

== Game summaries ==
=== At Maryland ===
	1	2	3	4	Total
#18 Spiders	7	7	0	7	21
Terrapins	10	12	7	21	50

=== At Hampton ===
	1	2	3	4	Total
#22 Spiders	7	3	6	15	31
Pirates	14	7	7	0	28

=== VMI ===
	1	2	3	4	Total
Keydets	3	7	0	0	10
#22 Spiders	7	14	14	7	42

=== Maine ===
	1	2	3	4	Total
Black Bears	7	3	7	0	17
#19 Spiders	14	6	14	14	48

=== Elon ===
	1	2	3	4	Total
Phoenix	0	0	0	14	14
#16 Spiders	7	10	3	7	27

=== At Rhode Island ===
	1	2	3	4	Total
#13 Spiders	13	7	3	14	37
Rams	3	3	0	6	12

=== At James Madison ===
	1	2	3	4	Total
#11 Spiders	7	21	14	17	59
#4 Dukes	14	14	7	14	49

=== Albany ===
	1	2	3	4	Total
Great Danes	0	10	14	7	31
#6 Spiders	17	7	14	0	38

=== At New Hampshire ===
	1	2	3	4	Total
#5 Spiders	7	0	15	3	25
Wildcats	14	7	6	3	30

=== At Villanova ===
	1	2	3	4	Total
#9 Spiders	0	7	7	6	20
Wildcats	0	7	7	7	21

=== William & Mary ===
	1	2	3	4	Total
#7 Tribe	3	3	3	0	9
#14 Spiders	0	7	13	0	20

== FCS Playoffs ==
=== Second Round – William & Mary ===
	1	2	3	4	Total
#13 Tribe	3	7	3	0	13
#12 Spiders	14	14	7	13	48

=== Quarterfinals – Illinois State ===
	1	2	3	4	Total
#12 Spiders	10	9	6	14	39
#4 Redbirds	0	7	7	13	27

=== Semifinals – North Dakota State ===
	1	2	3	4	Total
#12 Spiders	0	0	7	0	7
#2 Bison	13	13	0	7	33

== Ranking movements ==
Ranking movements Legend: ██ Increase in ranking ██ Decrease in ranking
	Week													
Poll	Pre	1	2	3	4	5	6	7	8	9	10	11	12	Final
STATS FCS	18	22	22	19	19	16	13	11	6	5	9	14	12	4
Coaches	18	22	23	20	20	18	13	12	8	7	12	16	11	3
