= 2015 James Madison Dukes football team =

American college football season

2015 James Madison Dukes football

CAA co-champion

FCS Playoffs Second Round, L 38–44 vs. Colgate
- Conference: Colonial Athletic Association

Ranking
- STATS: No. 11
- FCS Coaches: No. 11
- Record: 9–3 (6–2 CAA)
- Head coach: Everett Withers (2nd season)
- Co-offensive coordinators: Brett Elliott (1st season); Zak Kuhr (1st season)
- Defensive coordinator: Steve Sisa (2nd season)
- Home stadium: Bridgeforth Stadium

2015 Colonial Athletic Association football standings
	Conf.			Overall
Team	W		L	W		L
No. 4 Richmond +^	6	–	2	10	–	4
No. 11 James Madison +^	6	–	2	9	–	3
No. 12 William & Mary +^	6	–	2	9	–	4
Towson	5	–	3	7	–	4
New Hampshire ^	5	–	3	7	–	5
Villanova	5	–	3	6	–	5
Stony Brook	3	–	5	5	–	5
Delaware	3	–	5	4	–	7
Elon	3	–	5	4	–	7
Maine	3	–	5	3	–	8
Albany	2	–	6	3	–	8
Rhode Island	1	–	7	1	–	10
+ – Conference co-champions; ^ – FCS playoff participant; Rankings from STATS Poll

The 2015 James Madison Dukes football team represented James Madison University during the 2015 NCAA Division I FCS football season. They were led by second-year head coach Everett Withers and played their home games at Bridgeforth Stadium and Zane Showker Field. They were a member of the Colonial Athletic Association (CAA). The Dukes finished the regular season 9–2 to share the CAA championship with William & Mary and Richmond, who all finished with identical 6–2 conference records. They received an at-large bid to the FCS Playoffs, where they lost in the second round to Colgate and finish the season 9–3.

On January 6, 2016, Withers resigned to become the head coach at Texas State. He finished at James Madison with a two-year record of 18–7.

== Schedule ==
Date	Time	Opponent	Rank	Site	TV	Result	Attendance
September 5	6:00 pm	Morehead State*	No. 12	Bridgeforth Stadium; Harrisonburg, VA	MZ	W 56–7	22,080
September 12	4:00 pm	Lehigh*	No. 13	Bridgeforth Stadium; Harrisonburg, VA	MZ	W 55–17	15,949
September 19	3:00 pm	Albany	No. 12	Bridgeforth Stadium; Harrisonburg, VA	CSN	W 42–28	18,659
September 26	7:00 pm	at SMU*	No. 9	Gerald J. Ford Stadium; University Park, TX	ESPN3	W 48–45	22,314
October 3	12:00 pm	Stony Brook	No. 6	Bridgeforth Stadium; Harrisonburg, VA	CSN	W 38–20	21,653
October 10	3:00 pm	at Towson	No. 5	Johnny Unitas Stadium; Towson, MD	CSN	W 51–30	8,224
October 17	3:00 pm	at Elon	No. 5	Rhodes Stadium; Elon, NC		W 51–0	8,342
October 24	3:30 pm	No. 11 Richmond^{†}	No. 4	Bridgeforth Stadium; Harrisonburg, VA (College Gameday, rivalry)	CSN	L 49–59	26,069
October 31	4:00 pm	at No. 16 William & Mary	No. 9	Zable Stadium; Williamsburg, VA (rivalry)	NBCSN	L 41–44	9,414
November 14	3:30 pm	at Delaware	No. 14	Delaware Stadium; Newark, DE (rivalry)	CSN	W 24–21	16,994
November 21	12:00 pm	Villanova	No. 12	Bridgeforth Stadium; Harrisonburg, VA	CSN	W 38–29	17,028
December 5	1:00 pm	Colgate*	No. 8	Bridgeforth Stadium; Harrisonburg, VA (FCS Playoffs Second Round)	ESPN3	L 38–44	15,045
*Non-conference game; ^{†}Homecoming; Rankings from STATS FCS Poll released prior to game Poll released prior to the game; All times are in Eastern time

== Game summaries ==
=== Morehead State ===
	1	2	3	4	Total
Eagles	0	7	0	0	7
#12 Dukes	14	14	21	7	56

=== Lehigh ===
	1	2	3	4	Total
Mountain Hawks	7	7	3	0	17
#13 Dukes	10	28	7	10	55

=== Albany ===
	1	2	3	4	Total
Great Danes	7	7	0	14	28
#12 Dukes	14	0	21	7	42

=== SMU ===
	1	2	3	4	Total
#9 Dukes	10	7	17	14	48
Mustangs	7	7	17	14	45

=== Stony Brook ===
	1	2	3	4	Total
Seawolves	7	0	0	13	20
#6 Dukes	21	7	10	0	38

=== Towson ===
	1	2	3	4	Total
#5 Dukes	14	10	17	10	51
Tigers	6	11	6	7	30

=== Elon ===
	1	2	3	4	Total
#5 Dukes	13	21	10	7	51
Phoenix	0	0	0	0	0

=== Richmond ===
	1	2	3	4	Total
#11 Spiders	7	21	14	17	59
#4 Dukes	14	14	7	14	49

ESPN's College GameDay broadcast from the JMU campus for the first time.

=== William & Mary ===
	1	2	3	4	Total
#9 Dukes	21	6	7	7	41
#16 Tribe	9	14	7	14	44

=== Delaware ===
	1	2	3	4	Total
#14 Dukes	7	0	7	10	24
Fightin' Blue Hens	7	0	14	0	21

=== Villanova ===
	1	2	3	4	Total
Wildcats	7	0	7	15	29
#12 Dukes	14	7	3	14	38

== FCS Playoffs ==
=== Second Round–Colgate ===
	1	2	3	4	Total
Raiders	10	14	14	6	44
#8 Dukes	0	28	3	7	38

== Ranking movements ==
Ranking movements Legend: ██ Increase in ranking ██ Decrease in ranking ( ) = First-place votes
	Week													
Poll	Pre	1	2	3	4	5	6	7	8	9	10	11	12	Final
STATS FCS	12	13	12	9	6 (4)	5 (8)	5 (12)	4 (18)	9	14	14	12	8	11
Coaches	13	11	10	8	5 (1)	5	5 (2)	3 (3)	9	14	11	10	6	11
