= 2015 Elon Phoenix football team =

American college football season

2015 Elon Phoenix football
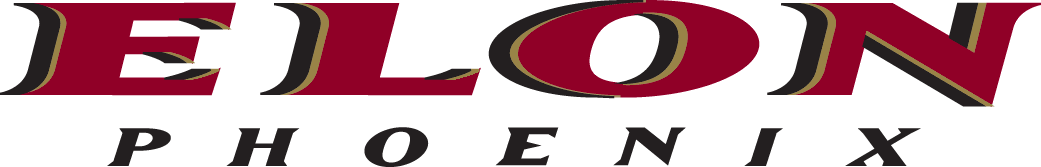
- Conference: Colonial Athletic Association
- Record: 4–7 (3–5 CAA)
- Head coach: Rich Skrosky (2nd season)
- Offensive coordinator: Damian Wroblewski (2nd season)
- Defensive coordinator: Jerry Petercuskie (2nd season)
- Home stadium: Rhodes Stadium

2015 Colonial Athletic Association football standings
| | Conf. | | | Overall |
| Team | W | | L | W | | L |
|---|---|---|---|---|---|---|
| No. 4 Richmond +^ | 6 | – | 2 | 10 | – | 4 |
| No. 11 James Madison +^ | 6 | – | 2 | 9 | – | 3 |
| No. 12 William & Mary +^ | 6 | – | 2 | 9 | – | 4 |
| Towson | 5 | – | 3 | 7 | – | 4 |
| New Hampshire ^ | 5 | – | 3 | 7 | – | 5 |
| Villanova | 5 | – | 3 | 6 | – | 5 |
| Stony Brook | 3 | – | 5 | 5 | – | 5 |
| Delaware | 3 | – | 5 | 4 | – | 7 |
| Elon | 3 | – | 5 | 4 | – | 7 |
| Maine | 3 | – | 5 | 3 | – | 8 |
| Albany | 2 | – | 6 | 3 | – | 8 |
| Rhode Island | 1 | – | 7 | 1 | – | 10 |
+ – Conference co-champions; ^ – FCS playoff participant; Rankings from STATS Poll

The 2015 Elon Phoenix football team represented Elon University in the 2015 NCAA Division I FCS football season. They were led by second-year head coach Rich Skrosky and played their home games at Rhodes Stadium. They were second year members of the Colonial Athletic Association (CAA). They finished the season 4–7, 3–5 in CAA play to finish in a four-way tie for seventh place.

== Schedule ==
| Date | Time | Opponent | Site | TV | Result | Attendance |
|---|---|---|---|---|---|---|
| September 3 | 7:00 pm | at Wake Forest* | BB&T Field; Winston-Salem, NC | ESPN3 | L 3–41 | 27,126 |
| September 12 | 6:00 pm | at Gardner–Webb* | Ernest W. Spangler Stadium; Boiling Springs, NC | BSN | W 21–13 ^{3OT} | 5,450 |
| September 19 | 6:00 pm | North Carolina A&T* | Rhodes Stadium; Elon, NC | PAA | L 7–14 | 9,729 |
| September 26 | 3:00 pm | Towson | Rhodes Stadium; Elon, NC | PAA | W 17–13 | 8,027 |
| October 3 | 3:30 pm | at No. 20 New Hampshire | Cowell Stadium; Durham, NH | ASN | L 14–37 | 16,713 |
| October 10 | 3:30 pm | at No. 16 Richmond | E. Claiborne Robins Stadium; Richmond, VA | | L 14–27 | 8,216 |
| October 17 | 3:00 pm | No. 5 James Madison^{†} | Rhodes Stadium; Elon, NC | PAA | L 0–51 | 8,342 |
| October 31 | 12:00 pm | at Stony Brook | Kenneth P. LaValle Stadium; Stony Brook, NY | ASN | W 21–7 | 5,578 |
| November 7 | 12:00 pm | No. 12 William & Mary | Rhodes Stadium; Elon, NC | CSN | L 13–34 | 11,250 |
| November 14 | 12:30 pm | at Maine | Alfond Stadium; Orono, ME | FCS | W 27–22 | 3,131 |
| November 21 | 12:00 pm | Delaware | Rhodes Stadium; Elon, NC | PAA | L 10–14 | 6,823 |
*Non-conference game; ^{†}Homecoming; Rankings from STATS Poll released prior to the game; All times are in Eastern time
