= 2015 Rhode Island Rams football team =

American college football season

2015 Rhode Island Rams football
- Conference: Colonial Athletic Association
- Record: 1–10 (1–7 CAA)
- Head coach: Jim Fleming (2nd season)
- Offensive coordinator: Bill Bleil (2nd season)
- Defensive coordinator: Pete Rekstis (2nd season)
- Home stadium: Meade Stadium

2015 Colonial Athletic Association football standings
	Conf.			Overall
Team	W		L	W		L
No. 4 Richmond +^	6	–	2	10	–	4
No. 11 James Madison +^	6	–	2	9	–	3
No. 12 William & Mary +^	6	–	2	9	–	4
Towson	5	–	3	7	–	4
New Hampshire ^	5	–	3	7	–	5
Villanova	5	–	3	6	–	5
Stony Brook	3	–	5	5	–	5
Delaware	3	–	5	4	–	7
Elon	3	–	5	4	–	7
Maine	3	–	5	3	–	8
Albany	2	–	6	3	–	8
Rhode Island	1	–	7	1	–	10
+ – Conference co-champions; ^ – FCS playoff participant; Rankings from STATS Poll

The 2015 Rhode Island Rams football team represented the University of Rhode Island in the 2015 NCAA Division I FCS football season. They were led by second year head coach Jim Fleming and played their home games at Meade Stadium. They were a member of the Colonial Athletic Association. They finished the season 1–10, 1–7 in CAA play to finish in last place.

== Schedule ==
Date	Time	Opponent	Site	TV	Result	Attendance
September 4	7:00 pm	at Syracuse*	Carrier Dome; Syracuse, NY	ESPN3	L 0–47	30,112
September 12	3:30 pm	at Albany	Bob Ford Field at Tom & Mary Casey Stadium; Albany, NY	ASN	L 7–35	6,081
September 19	1:00 pm	No. 25 Harvard*	Meade Stadium; Kingston, RI		L 10–41	4,843
September 26	3:30 pm	at Maine	Alfond Stadium; Orono, ME	ASN	L 17–27	7,535
October 3	6:00 pm	at Brown*	Brown Stadium; Providence, RI (Governor's Cup)		L 31–41	5,183
October 10	12:00 pm	Delaware	Meade Stadium; Kingston, RI		W 20–0	4,015
October 17	12:00 pm	No. 13 Richmond^{†}	Meade Stadium; Kingston, RI		L 12–37	6,143
October 31	1:00 pm	at New Hampshire	Cowell Stadium; Durham, NH		L 17–20	5,003
November 7	12:30 pm	Villanova	Meade Stadium; Kingston, RI		L 3–24	6,122
November 14	12:30 pm	Stony Brook	Meade Stadium; Kingston, RI		L 7–19	2,643
November 21	2:00 pm	at Towson	Johnny Unitas Stadium; Towson, MD		L 21–38	5,128
*Non-conference game; ^{†}Homecoming; Rankings from STATS Poll released prior to the game; All times are in Eastern time

== Game summaries ==
=== At Syracuse ===
	1	2	3	4	Total
Rams	0	0	0	0	0
Orange	14	17	9	7	47

=== At Albany ===
	1	2	3	4	Total
Rams	0	0	0	7	7
Great Danes	14	0	14	7	35

=== Harvard ===
	1	2	3	4	Total
#25 Crimson	14	7	7	13	41
Rams	0	10	0	0	10

=== At Maine ===
	1	2	3	4	Total
Rams	3	0	7	7	17
Black Bears	14	3	7	3	27

=== At Brown ===
	1	2	3	4	Total
Rams	0	14	10	7	31
Bears	14	6	0	21	41

=== Delaware ===
	1	2	3	4	Total
Fightin' Blue Hens	0	0	0	0	0
Rams	3	7	7	3	20

=== Richmond ===
	1	2	3	4	Total
#13 Spiders	13	7	3	14	37
Rams	3	3	0	6	12

=== At New Hampshire ===
	1	2	3	4	Total
Rams	3	14	0	0	17
Wildcats	0	0	14	6	20

=== Villanova ===
	1	2	3	4	Total
Rams	0	3	0	0	3
Wildcats	7	0	7	10	24

=== Stony Brook ===
	1	2	3	4	Total
Seawolves	9	3	7	0	19
Rams	0	7	0	0	7

=== At Towson ===
	1	2	3	4	Total
Rams	7	14	0	0	21
Tigers	14	7	14	3	38

== Coaching staff ==
Rhode Island Rams
Name	Position	Consecutive season at Rhode Island in current position	Previous position
Jim Fleming	Head coach	2nd	UCF defensive coordinator (2012–2013)
Bill Bleil	Offensive coordinator and offensive line coach	2nd	Iowa State assistant head coach and tight ends coach (2013)
Pete Rekstis	Defensive coordinator and defensive backs coach	2nd	Florida Atlantic defensive backs coach (2012–2013)
Ari Confesor	Wide receivers coach	2nd	Rhode Island linebackers coach (2013)
Joe Coniglio	Defensive line coach	2nd	Northern Michigan defensive line coach (2012–2013)
Matt Dawson	Special teams coordinator and linebackers coach	1st	Rhode Island linebackers coach (2014)
Will Fleming	Tight ends coach	2nd	Towson student assistant (2013)
Troy Gilmer	Defensive assistant	2nd	Akron graduate assistant (2013)
Jim Miceli	Quarterbacks coach	2nd	Gilman School (MD) co-offensive coordinator and quarterbacks coach (2013)
Diamond Weaver	Running backs coach	2nd	Rochester C&T defensive backs coach (2013)
