= 2015 Delaware Fightin' Blue Hens football team =

American college football season

2015 Delaware Fightin' Blue Hens football
- Conference: Colonial Athletic Association
- Record: 4–7 (3–5 CAA)
- Head coach: Dave Brock (3rd season)
- Offensive coordinator: Sean Devine (3rd season)
- Offensive scheme: Multiple
- Co-defensive coordinators: Dennis Dottin-Carter (2nd season); Tim Weaver (3rd season)
- Base defense: 4–3
- Home stadium: Delaware Stadium

2015 Colonial Athletic Association football standings
	Conf.			Overall
Team	W		L	W		L
No. 4 Richmond +^	6	–	2	10	–	4
No. 11 James Madison +^	6	–	2	9	–	3
No. 12 William & Mary +^	6	–	2	9	–	4
Towson	5	–	3	7	–	4
New Hampshire ^	5	–	3	7	–	5
Villanova	5	–	3	6	–	5
Stony Brook	3	–	5	5	–	5
Delaware	3	–	5	4	–	7
Elon	3	–	5	4	–	7
Maine	3	–	5	3	–	8
Albany	2	–	6	3	–	8
Rhode Island	1	–	7	1	–	10
+ – Conference co-champions; ^ – FCS playoff participant; Rankings from STATS Poll

The 2015 Delaware Fightin' Blue Hens football team represented the University of Delaware as a member of the Colonial Athletic Association (CAA) during the 2015 NCAA Division I FCS football season. Led by third-year head coach Dave Brock, the Fightin' Blue Hens compiled an overall record of 4–7 with a mark of 3–5 in conference play, placing in a four-way tie for seventh in the CAA. The team played home games at Delaware Stadium in Newark, Delaware.

== Schedule ==
Date	Time	Opponent	Site	TV	Result	Attendance
September 4	7:00 pm	Jacksonville*	Delaware Stadium; Newark, DE	HAA	L 14–20	17,472
September 12	6:00 pm	Lafayette*	Delaware Stadium; Newark, DE	ESPN3/HNN	W 19–9	12,809
September 19	12:00 pm	at No. 6 Villanova	Villanova Stadium; Villanova, PA (Battle of the Blue)	CSN	L 21–28	11,779
September 26	12:30 pm	at North Carolina*	Kenan Memorial Stadium; Chapel Hill, NC	ACCRSN	L 14–41	39,000
October 3	7:30 pm	No. 25 William & Mary	Delaware Stadium; Newark, DE (rivalry)	NBCSN	W 24–23	12,437
October 10	12:00 pm	at Rhode Island	Meade Stadium; Kingston, RI		L 0–20	4,015
October 24	3:30 pm	New Hampshire	Delaware Stadium; Newark, DE (Parents & Family Weekend)	HAA	W 31–14	19,924
October 31	2:00 pm	at Towson	Johnny Unitas Stadium; Towson, MD		L 0–19	5,234
November 7	12:00 pm	Albany^{†}	Delaware Stadium; Newark, DE	HAA	L 6–17	15,318
November 14	3:30 pm	No. 14 James Madison	Delaware Stadium; Newark, DE (rivalry)	CSN	L 21–24	16,994
November 21	12:00 pm	at Elon	Rhodes Stadium; Elon, NC		W 14–10	6,823
*Non-conference game; ^{†}Homecoming; Rankings from STATS Poll released prior to the game; All times are in Eastern time

== Coaching staff ==
Name	Position	Year	Alma mater
Dave Brock	Head coach	2013	Salisbury (1994)
Sean Devine	Offensive coordinator/offensive line	2013	Colby (1994)
Tim Weaver	Co-defensive coordinator/linebackers	2013	Davidson (1990)
Dennis Dottin-Carter	Co-defensive coordinator/defensive line	2013	Maine (2002)
Brian Ginn	Quarterbacks	2000	Delaware (2000)
Bryan Bossard	Wide receivers	2014	Delaware (1988)
Tony Lucas	Running backs	2013	Columbia (2003)
Eddie Allen	Special teams coordinator/tight ends	2014	New Haven (2003)
Henry Baker	Cornerbacks	2011	Maryland (2003)
Tom McEntire	Safeties	2013	Thiel (2006)
Jerry Oravitz	Associate Director of Athletics for Football Administration	1997	Salisbury (1984)
David Baylor	Player Development	2006	Bentley (1997)
Jude Moser	Administrative Assistant		

== Preseason ==
=== Recruiting class ===
Delaware announced signing a class of 22 incoming freshmen on February 4, 2015.

College recruiting information
Name	Hometown	School	Height	Weight	40^{‡}	Commit date
Nasir Adderley; DB	Malvern, PA	Great Valley HS	6 ft 0 in (1.83 m)	180 lb (82 kg)	–	Jan 18, 2015
Nasir Adderley; DB	Recruit ratings: No ratings found					
Tenny Adewusi; DB	Avenel, NJ	Colonia HS	6 ft 1 in (1.85 m)	185 lb (84 kg)	4.84	Feb 4, 2015
Tenny Adewusi; DB	Recruit ratings: No ratings found					
Lloyd Badson; DL	Bear, DE	Caravel Academy	6 ft 3 in (1.91 m)	250 lb (110 kg)	–	Feb 4, 2015
Lloyd Badson; DL	Recruit ratings: No ratings found					
Samir Bullock; RB	Philadelphia, PA	Archbishop Ryan HS	5 ft 8 in (1.73 m)	165 lb (75 kg)	4.45	Jan 17, 2015
Samir Bullock; RB	Recruit ratings: 247Sports:					
Arrington Gipson; DT	Aliquippa, PA	Aliquippa HS	6 ft 2 in (1.88 m)	295 lb (134 kg)	–	Jan 30, 2015
Arrington Gipson; DT	Recruit ratings: Rivals: 247Sports:					
K.C. Hinton; DB	Henrico, VA	Highland Springs HS	5 ft 10 in (1.78 m)	190 lb (86 kg)	–	Feb 4, 2015
K.C. Hinton; DB	Recruit ratings: No ratings found					
Jamie Jarmon; QB	Millsboro, DE	Indian River HS	6 ft 1 in (1.85 m)	225 lb (102 kg)	–	Aug 21, 2014
Jamie Jarmon; QB	Recruit ratings: No ratings found					
Que'Shawn Jenkins; LB	Steelton, PA	Bishop McDevitt HS	6 ft 1 in (1.85 m)	230 lb (100 kg)	–	Feb 4, 2015
Que'Shawn Jenkins; LB	Recruit ratings: No ratings found					
Ray Jones; DB	Newark, DE	Hodgson Vo-Tech	6 ft 0 in (1.83 m)	195 lb (88 kg)	4.73	Oct 21, 2014
Ray Jones; DB	Recruit ratings: Rivals: 247Sports:					
M.J. Kehoe; OL	Madison, CT	Cheshire Academy	6 ft 5 in (1.96 m)	235 lb (107 kg)	–	Aug 15, 2014
M.J. Kehoe; OL	Recruit ratings: No ratings found					
Patrick Kehoe; QB	Madison, CT	Cheshire Academy	6 ft 4 in (1.93 m)	230 lb (100 kg)	–	Aug 15, 2014
Patrick Kehoe; QB	Recruit ratings: No ratings found					
Cam Kitchen; DL	Lawrenceville, NJ	Lawrence HS/Hun School of Princeton	6 ft 2 in (1.88 m)	240 lb (110 kg)	–	Feb 4, 2015
Cam Kitchen; DL	Recruit ratings: No ratings found					
Christian Lohin; DL	North Wales, PA	Archbishop Wood HS	6 ft 3 in (1.91 m)	235 lb (107 kg)	–	Aug 14, 2014
Christian Lohin; DL	Recruit ratings: No ratings found					
Austin Luckey; LB	Fitchburg, MA	Lawrence Academy	6 ft 2 in (1.88 m)	218 lb (99 kg)	–	Feb 4, 2015
Austin Luckey; LB	Recruit ratings: No ratings found					
Connor Lutz; OL	Milford, PA	Delaware Valley HS	6 ft 5 in (1.96 m)	260 lb (120 kg)	–	Oct 30, 2014
Connor Lutz; OL	Recruit ratings: 247Sports:					
Vinny Papale; WR	Cherry Hill, NJ	Bishop Eustace Prep	6 ft 1 in (1.85 m)	185 lb (84 kg)	–	Dec 12, 2014
Vinny Papale; WR	Recruit ratings: Rivals: 247Sports:					
Diasjon Robinson; DL	Jersey City, NJ	Lincoln HS	6 ft 1 in (1.85 m)	285 lb (129 kg)	–	Feb 4, 2015
Diasjon Robinson; DL	Recruit ratings: 247Sports:					
Steve Robinson; OL	Philadelphia, PA	St. Joseph's Prep	6 ft 4 in (1.93 m)	280 lb (130 kg)	–	Feb 4, 2015
Steve Robinson; OL	Recruit ratings: No ratings found					
Jasawn Thompson; LB	Deer Park, NY	Deer Park HS	6 ft 2 in (1.88 m)	220 lb (100 kg)	–	Feb 4, 2015
Jasawn Thompson; LB	Recruit ratings: No ratings found					
Owen Tyler; TE	West Hartford, CT	Northwest Catholic HS	6 ft 4 in (1.93 m)	240 lb (110 kg)	4.8	Jan 29, 2015
Owen Tyler; TE	Recruit ratings: No ratings found					
Collin Wallish; OL	Silver Spring, MD	St. John's College HS	6 ft 4 in (1.93 m)	265 lb (120 kg)	–	Feb 4, 2015
Collin Wallish; OL	Recruit ratings: No ratings found					
Justin Washington; WR	Winchester, VA	John Handley HS	6 ft 3 in (1.91 m)	200 lb (91 kg)	–	Feb 4, 2015
Justin Washington; WR	Recruit ratings: No ratings found					
Overall recruit ranking:
‡ Refers to 40-yard dash; Note: In many cases, Scout, Rivals, 247Sports, On3, and ESPN may conflict in their listings of height, weight and 40 time.; In these cases, the average was taken. ESPN grades are on a 100-point scale.; Sources: "Delaware Commit List for 2015". Rivals.; "RecruitTracker 2015: Delaware". ESPN.; "2015 Team Ranking". Rivals.com.

== Game summaries ==
=== Jacksonville ===
Team	1	2	3	4	Total
• Dolphins	7	0	3	10	20
Blue Hens	0	7	0	7	14

- Location: Delaware Stadium
  Newark, Delaware
- Game start: 7:06 PM
- Elapsed time: 2:56
- Game attendance: 17,472
- Game weather: Temp: 76 • Wind: 10 NE • Weather: Partly Cloudy
- Referee: Tony Marcello

Scoring summary
1	10:08	Jacksonville	Kade Bell 22 yard pass to Andy Jones (Brandon Behr kick)	Jacksonville 7–0
2	1:20	Delaware	Diante Cherry 22 yard pass to Jalen Randolph (Frank Raggo kick)	Tied 7–7
3	3:15	Jacksonville	Brandon Behr 42 yard Field Goal	Jacksonville 10–7
4	9:34	Jacksonville	Brandon Behr 41 yard Field Goal	Jacksonville 13–7
4	2:09	Jacksonville	Justin Horton 0 yard fumble recovery (Brandon Behr kick)	Jacksonville 20–7
4	1:20	Delaware	Jalen Randolph 1 yard run (Frank Raggo kick)	Jacksonville 20–14

- Passing leaders: Kade Bell (JU): 25–43, 269 yd., 1 TD, 1 INT; Blake Rankin (UD): 6–10, 60 yd.
- Rushing leaders: Wes Hills (UD): 16 car., 88 yd.; Kade Bell (JU): 8 car., 28 yd.
- Receiving leaders: Andy Jones (JU): 9 rec., 118 yd., 1 TD; Diante Cherry (UD): 5 rec., 68 yd.

Jacksonville	Statistic	Delaware
17	First downs	14
5–16	3rd Down	6–15
1–1	4th Down	0–0
339	Total yards	297
269	Passing	134
25–43	Comp–Att	10–20
5.8	Avg.	6.1
1	Interceptions	0
70	Rushing	163
26	Attempts	42
2.7	Avg.	3.9
12–90	Penalties	6–41
1	Turnovers	2
0	Fumbles	2
28:34	T.O.P.	31:26

=== Lafayette ===
Team	1	2	3	4	Total
Leopards	3	0	6	0	9
• Blue Hens	0	13	0	6	19

- Location: Delaware Stadium
  Newark, Delaware
- Game start: 6:06 PM
- Elapsed time: 3:52
- Game attendance: 12,809
- Game weather: Temp: 73 • Wind: 9 SE • Weather: Intermittent showers (1:10 Lightning Delay)
- Referee: Warren Gillis

Scoring summary
1	10:56	Lafayette	Jacob Bissell 40 yard field goal	Lafayette 3–0
2	7:57	Delaware	Frank Raggo 19 yard field goal	Tied 3–3
2	5:04	Delaware	Joe Walker 1 yard run (Frank Raggo kick)	Delaware 10–3
2	1:13	Delaware	Frank Raggo 45 yard field goal	Delaware 13–3
3	5:44	Lafayette	Jacob Bissell 40 yard field goal	Delaware 13–6
3	2:31	Lafayette	Jacob Bissell 47 yard field goal	Delaware 13–9
4	6:27	Delaware	Frank Raggo 20 yard field goal	Delaware 16–9
4	0:28	Delaware	Frank Raggo 22 yard field goal	Delaware 19–9

- Passing leaders: Blake Searfoss (LC): 13–24, 171 yds., 1 INT; Joe Walker (UD): 4–15, 58 yds.
- Rushing Leaders: Kareem Williams (UD): 14 car., 93 yds.; DeSean Brown (LC): 17 car. 84 yds.
- Receiving Leaders: Matt Mrazek (LC): 3 rec., 68 yds.; Ryley Angeline (UD): 1 rec., 41 yds.

Lafayette	Statistic	Delaware
15	First downs	15
5–16	3rd Down	6–16
0–0	4th Down	0–1
270	Total yards	315
215	Passing	58
18–33	Comp–Att	4–15
6.5	Avg.	3.9
1	Interceptions	0
55	Rushing	257
31	Attempts	53
1.8	Avg.	4.8
2–20	Penalties	4–23
1	Turnovers	0
0	Fumbles	0
25:31	T.O.P.	34:29

=== Villanova ===
Battle of the Blue

Team	1	2	3	4	Total
Blue Hens	10	3	0	8	21
• #6 Wildcats	7	7	0	14	28

- Location: Villanova Stadium
  Villanova, Pennsylvania
- Game start: 12:07 PM
- Elapsed time: 3:18
- Game attendance: 11,779
- Game weather: Temp: 79 • Wind: 6 SSE • Weather: Mostly Sunny
- Referee: J. Gray
- Television network: Comcast SportsNet

Scoring summary
1	11:19	Villanova	John Robertson 6 yard run (Steve Weyler kick)	Villanova 7–0
1	8:01	Delaware	Frank Raggo 34 yard field goal	Villanova 7–3
1	4:59	Delaware	Jalen Randolph 1 yard run (Frank Raggo kick)	Delaware 10–7
2	14:48	Villanova	Gary Underwood 8 yard pass from John Robertson (Steve Weyler kick)	Villanova 14–10
2	0:00	Delaware	Frank Raggo 44 yard field goal	Villanova 14–13
4	10:58	Delaware	Thomas Jefferson 23 yard run (Diante Cherry rush)	Delaware 21–14
4	6:18	Villanova	Kevin Gulyas 6 yard pass from Zach Bednarczyk (kick failed)	Delaware 21–20
4	2:35	Villanova	Zach Bednarczyk 21 yard run (Zach Bednarczyk rush)	Villanova 28–21

- Villanova ended their 2014 season with an NCAA Quarterfinal loss to Sam Houston State.
- Passing leaders: John Robertson (VU): 14–24, 208 yds., 1 TD; Joe Walker (UD): 13–28, 94 yds., 1 INT
- Rushing Leaders: Jalen Randolph (UD): 14 car., 84 yds., 1 TD; Gary Underwood (VU): 9 car. 34 yds.
- Receiving Leaders: Kevin Gulyas (VU): 8 rec., 152 yds., 1 TD; Diante Cherry (UD): 8 rec., 78 yds.

Delaware	Statistic	Villanova
21	First downs	18
9–20	3rd Down	5–14
2–3	4th Down	4–4
299	Total yards	355
94	Passing	265
13–30	Comp–Att	18–30
3.1	Avg.	8.8
1	Interceptions	0
205	Rushing	90
51	Attempts	28
4.0	Avg.	3.2
4–37	Penalties	8–70
1	Turnovers	1
0	Fumbles	1
35:31	T.O.P.	24:29

=== North Carolina ===
Team	1	2	3	4	Total
Blue Hens	7	0	7	0	14
• Tar Heels	7	6	14	14	41

- Location: Kenan Memorial Stadium
  Chapel Hill, North Carolina
- Game start: 12:34 PM
- Elapsed time: 2:51
- Game attendance: 39,000
- Game weather: Temp: 65 • Wind: 12 NE • Weather: Rain
- Referee: Tom McCreesh
- Television network: ESPN3

Scoring summary
1	14:09	Delaware	Thomas Jefferson 72 yard run (Frank Raggo kick)	Delaware 7–0
1	12:45	North Carolina	Marquise Williams 18 yard run (Nick Weiler kick)	Tied 7–7
2	8:16	North Carolina	Nick Weiler 46 yard field goal	North Carolina 10–7
2	3:15	North Carolina	Nick Weiler 26 yard field goal	North Carolina 13–7
3	10:20	North Carolina	Mack Hollins 33 yard pass from Mitch Trubisky (Nick Weiler kick)	North Carolina 20–7
3	3:21	Delaware	Thomas Jefferson 1 yard run (Frank Raggo kick)	North Carolina 20–14
3	1:40	North Carolina	Mack Hollins 64 yard pass from Mitch Trubisky (Nick Weiler kick)	North Carolina 27–14
4	11:30	North Carolina	Bug Howard 10 yard pass from Mitch Trubisky (Nick Weiler kick)	North Carolina 34–14
4	6:35	North Carolina	Ryan Switzer 63 yard pass from Mitch Trubisky (Nick Weiler kick)	North Carolina 41–14

- North Carolina ended their 2014 season with a loss in the Quick Lane Bowl to Rutgers.
- This was the first Delaware football game in the state of North Carolina.
- Passing leaders: Mitch Trubisky (UNC): 17–20, 312 yds., 4 TD; Joe Walker (UD): 4–10, 24 yds., 1 INT
- Rushing Leaders: Thomas Jefferson (UD): 22 car., 163 yds., 2 TD; Elijah Hood (UNC): 14 car. 61 yds.
- Receiving Leaders: Mack Hollins (UNC): 3 rec., 100 yds., 2 TD; Tre Brown (UD): 1 rec., 9 yds.
- Thomas Jefferson was named CAA Rookie of the Week

Delaware	Statistic	North Carolina
15	First downs	29
2–11	3rd Down	10–13
2–3	4th Down	0–0
303	Total yards	568
24	Passing	377
4–10	Comp–Att	23–33
2.4	Avg.	11.1
1	Interceptions	0
279	Rushing	191
49	Attempts	35
5.7	Avg.	5.5
5–60	Penalties	2–20
1	Turnovers	1
0	Fumbles	1
34:18	T.O.P.	25:42

=== William & Mary ===
Team	1	2	3	4	Total
#25 Tribe	7	0	13	3	23
• Blue Hens	14	0	0	10	24

- Location: Delaware Stadium
  Newark, Delaware
- Game start: 7:35 PM
- Elapsed time: 3:02
- Game attendance: 12,437
- Game weather: Temp: 52 • Wind: 23 NE • Weather: Cloudy, Windy, Light Rain
- Referee: Henry Rimberg
- Television network: NBCSN

Scoring summary
1	8:52	Delaware	Kareem Williams 5 yard run (Frank Raggo kick)	Delaware 7–0
1	8:40	William & Mary	DeVonte Dedmond 89 yard kickoff return (Nick Dorka kick)	Tied 7–7
1	0:27	Delaware	Que'Shawn Jenkins 0 yard blocked punt return (Frank Raggo kick)	Delaware 14–7
3	10:37	William & Mary	Nick Dorka 30 yard field goal	Delaware 14–10
3	4:56	William & Mary	DeVonte Dedmond 57 yard pass from Steve Cluley (Nick Dorka kick)	William & Mary 17–14
3	1:17	William & Mary	Nick Dorka 47 yard field goal	William & Mary 20–14
4	12:01	William & Mary	Nick Dorka 35 yard field goal	William & Mary 23–14
4	6:41	Delaware	Tre Brown 11 yard pass from Joe Walker (Frank Raggo kick)	William & Mary 23–21
4	0:00	Delaware	Frank Raggo 29 yard field goal	Delaware 24–23

- Passing leaders: Steve Cluley (W&M): 8–20, 168 yds., 1 TD; Joe Walker (UD): 6–17, 71 yds., 1 TD
- Rushing Leaders: Thomas Jefferson (UD): 28 car., 174 yds.; Kendall Anderson (W&M): 23 car. 101 yds.
- Receiving Leaders: DeVonte Dedmond (W&M): 1 rec., 57 yds., 1 TD; Jamie Jarmon (UD): 7 rec., 56 yds.
- Thomas Jefferson was named CAA Rookie of the Week

William & Mary	Statistic	Delaware
14	First downs	26
2–9	3rd Down	10–17
0–0	4th Down	0–2
290	Total yards	418
168	Passing	71
8–20	Comp–Att	9–17
8.4	Avg.	4.2
0	Interceptions	0
122	Rushing	347
28	Attempts	65
4.4	Avg.	5.3
2–20	Penalties	5–46
1	Turnovers	0
1	Fumbles	0
18:48	T.O.P.	41:12

=== Rhode Island ===
Team	1	2	3	4	Total
Blue Hens	0	0	0	0	0
• Rams	3	7	7	3	20

- Location: Meade Stadium
  Kingston, Rhode Island
- Game start: 12:00 PM
- Elapsed time: 2:45
- Game attendance: 4,015
- Game weather: Temp: 56 • Wind: breezy • Weather: Bright skies
- Referee: Tom Kichline

Scoring summary
1	14:09	Rhode Island	Justin Rohrwasser 28 yard field goal	Rhode Island 3–0
2	0:08	Rhode Island	Harold Cooper 1 yard run (Justin Rohrwasser kick)	Rhode Island 10–0
3	6:24	Rhode Island	Tez Wilson 25 yard interception return (Justin Rohrwasser kick)	Rhode Island 17–0
4	8:58	Rhode Island	Justin Rohrwasser 41 yard field goal	Rhode Island 20–0

- Passing leaders: Paul Mroz (URI): 9–22, 90 yds.; Joe Walker (UD): 9–22, 71 yds., 3 INT
- Rushing Leaders: Harold Cooper (URI): 28 car., 123 yds., 1 TD; Joe Walker (UD): 13 car. 76 yds.
- Receiving Leaders: Khayri Denny (URI): 3 rec., 34 yds.; Que'Shawn Jenkins (UD): 1 rec., 28 yds.

Delaware	Statistic	Rhode Island
14	First downs	16
3–14	3rd Down	4–17
0–2	4th Down	1–2
283	Total yards	239
78	Passing	90
9–23	Comp–Att	9–22
3.2	Avg.	3.8
3	Interceptions	0
205	Rushing	149
41	Attempts	45
5.0	Avg.	3.3
9–120	Penalties	4–24
3	Turnovers	0
0	Fumbles	0
29:44	T.O.P.	30:16

=== New Hampshire ===
Parents & Family Weekend

Team	1	2	3	4	Total
Wildcats	7	7	0	0	14
• Blue Hens	6	0	18	7	31

- Location: Delaware Stadium
  Newark, Delaware
- Game start: 3:30 PM
- Elapsed time: 2:40
- Game attendance: 19,924
- Game weather: Temp: 56 • Wind: 11 S • Weather: Cloudy
- Referee: Tony Marcella

Scoring summary
1	9:10	New Hampshire	Dalton Crossan 3 yard run (Christian Breda kick)	New Hampshire 7–0
1	4:12	Delaware	Thomas Jefferson 1 yard run (Frank Raggo kick failed)	New Hampshire 7–6
2	0:05	New Hampshire	Jared Allison 2 yard pass from Sean Goldrich (Christian Breda kick)	New Hampshire 14–6
3	8:12	Delaware	Frank Raggo 33 yard field goal	New Hampshire 14–9
3	6:04	Delaware	Thomas Jefferson 7 yard run (Joe Walker rush)	Delaware 17–14
3	4:06	Delaware	Thomas Jefferson 1 yard run (Frank Raggo kick)	Delaware 24–14
4	3:09	Delaware	Kareem Williams 3 yard run (Frank Raggo kick)	Delaware 31–14

- New Hampshire ended their 2014 season with a CAA championship and an NCAA Semifinal loss to Illinois State.
- Passing leaders: Sean Goldrich (UNH): 18–33, 129 yds., 1 TD, 1 INT; Joe Walker (UD): 7–11, 71 yds.
- Rushing Leaders: Kareem Williams (UD): 16 car., 140 yds., 1 TD; Dalton Crossan (UNH): 10 car., 24 yds.
- Receiving Leaders: Thomas Jefferson (UD): 2 rec., 41 yds.; Kyon Taylor (UNH): 3 rec., 35 yds.
- Thomas Jefferson was named CAA Rookie of the Week

New Hampshire	Statistic	Delaware
9	First downs	17
3–15	3rd Down	10–18
4–5	4th Down	0–0
183	Total yards	355
133	Passing	71
19–24	Comp–Att	7–11
3.8	Avg.	5.5
1	Interceptions	0
50	Rushing	284
22	Attempts	55
2.3	Avg.	5.2
4–30	Penalties	5–37
2	Turnovers	0
1	Fumbles	0
22:19	T.O.P.	37:41

=== Towson ===
Team	1	2	3	4	Total
Blue Hens	0	0	0	0	0
• Tigers	0	13	3	3	19

- Location: Johnny Unitas Stadium
  Towson, Maryland
- Game start: 2:00 PM
- Elapsed time: 2:30
- Game attendance: 5,324
- Game weather: Temp: 55 • Wind: 5 SSE • Weather: Sunny
- Referee: Henry Wimberg

Scoring summary
2	13:45	Towson	Sam Hurwitz 34 yard field goal	Towson 3–0
2	5:35	Towson	Darius Victor 1 yard run (Sam Hurwitz kick)	Towson 10–0
2	0:00	Towson	Sam Hurwitz 39 yard field goal	Towson 13–0
3	2:37	Towson	Sam Hurwitz 27 yard field goal	Towson 16–0
4	4:10	Towson	Sam Hurwitz 39 yard field goal	Towson 19–0

- Passing leaders: Connor Frazier (TU): 25–34, 284 yds., 2 INT; Joe Walker (UD): 3–9, 14 yds., 1 INT
- Rushing Leaders: Marquel Dickerson (TU): 20 car., 120 yds.; Kareem Williams (UD): 13 car., 46 yds.
- Receiving Leaders: Christian Summers (TU): 8 rec., 133 yds.; Diante Cherry (UD): 2 rec., 9 yds.

Delaware	Statistic	Towson
6	First downs	25
4–11	3rd Down	7–14
0–1	4th Down	1–1
102	Total yards	410
14	Passing	284
3–9	Comp–Att	25–34
1.6	Avg.	8.4
1	Interceptions	2
88	Rushing	126
31	Attempts	41
2.8	Avg.	3.1
4–30	Penalties	6–35
2	Turnovers	2
1	Fumbles	0
21:56	T.O.P.	38:04

=== Albany ===
Homecoming

Team	1	2	3	4	Total
• Great Danes	0	3	7	7	17
Blue Hens	0	3	3	0	6

- Location: Delaware Stadium
  Newark, Delaware
- Game start: 12:06 PM
- Elapsed time: 2:52
- Game attendance: 15,318
- Game weather: Temp: 60 • Wind: 16 WNW • Weather: Cloudy
- Referee: Harry Wimberg

Scoring summary
2	3:01	Albany	Patrick Toole 28 yard field goal	Albany 3–0
2	0:12	Delaware	Frank Raggo 33 yard field goal	Tied 3–3
3	1:49	Delaware	Frank Raggo 21 yard field goal	Delaware 6–3
3	0:14	Albany	Cory Parker 0 yard fumble recovery (Patrick Toole kick)	Albany 10–6
4	10:23	Albany	Brad Harris 5 yard pass from DJ Crook (Patrick Toole kick)	Albany 17–6

- Passing leaders: Joe Walker (UD): 7–10, 52 yds.; DJ Crook (UA): 4–11, 27 yds., 1 TD
- Rushing Leaders: Elijah Ibitokun-Hanks (UA): 28 car., 135 yds.; Thomas Jefferson (UD): 10 car., 57 yds.
- Receiving Leaders: Diante Cherry (UD): 4 rec., 44 yds.; Zee Robinson (UA): 1 rec., 13 yds.

Albany	Statistic	Delaware
13	First downs	13
2–14	3rd Down	4–14
2–4	4th Down	0–1
289	Total yards	224
27	Passing	103
4–15	Comp–Att	12–19
1.8	Avg.	5.4
0	Interceptions	0
262	Rushing	121
50	Attempts	41
5.2	Avg.	3.0
4–20	Penalties	3–27
0	Turnovers	3
0	Fumbles	3
31:49	T.O.P.	28:11

=== James Madison ===
Team	1	2	3	4	Total
• #14 Dukes	7	0	7	10	24
Blue Hens	7	0	14	0	21

- Location: Delaware Stadium
  Newark, Delaware
- Game start: 3:30 PM
- Elapsed time: 2:54
- Game attendance: 16,994
- Game weather: Temp: 50 • Wind: 20 WNW • Weather: Sunny, Windy
- Referee: Jeff Gray
- Television network: Comcast SportsNet

Scoring summary
1	12:16	Delaware	Joe Walker 7 yard run (Frank Raggo kick)	Delaware 7–0
1	10:59	James Madison	Cardon Johnson 48 yard run (Ryan Maglio kick)	Tied 7–7
3	11:07	James Madison	Bryan Schor 3 yard run (Ryan Maglio kick)	James Madison 14–7
3	6:54	Delaware	Joe Walker 14 yard run (Frank Raggo kick)	Tied 14–14
3	0:29	Delaware	Ryan Torzsa 41 yard fumble return (Frank Raggo kick)	Delaware 21–14
4	11:39	James Madison	Ryan Maglio 22 yard field goal	Delaware 21–17
4	0:17	James Madison	Brandon Ravenel 12 yard pass from Bryan Schor (Ryan Maglio kick)	James Madison 24–21

- James Madison ended their 2014 season with an NCAA First Round loss to Liberty.
- Passing leaders: Brian Schor (JMU): 18–32, 193 yds., 1 TD; Joe Walker (UD): 3–11, 22 yds.
- Rushing Leaders: Thomas Jefferson (UD): 28 car., 120 yds.; Cardon Johnson (JMU): 14 car., 98 yds., 1 TD
- Receiving Leaders: Rashard Davis (JMU): 5 rec., 73 yds.; Dionte Cherry (UD): 3 rec., 22 yds.

James Madison	Statistic	Delaware
24	First downs	18
7–16	3rd Down	8–15
0–1	4th Down	1–1
388	Total yards	317
193	Passing	22
18–32	Comp–Att	3–11
6.5	Avg.	2.6
0	Interceptions	0
295	Rushing	195
43	Attempts	58
4.5	Avg.	5.1
2–10	Penalties	3–25
1	Turnovers	3
1	Fumbles	3
21:10	T.O.P.	38:50

=== Elon ===
Team	1	2	3	4	Total
• Blue Hens	0	7	7	0	14
Phoenix	7	3	0	0	10

- Location: Rhodes Stadium
  Elon, North Carolina
- Game start: 12:00 PM
- Elapsed time: 2:52
- Game attendance: 6,823
- Game weather: Temp: 53 • Wind: 5 ESE • Weather: Sunny
- Referee: Karlton Derrick

Scoring summary
1	7:17	Elon	Tereak McCray 24 yard pass from Connor Christiansen (John Gallagher kick)	Elon 7–0
2	9:38	Delaware	Kareem Williams 53 yard run (Frank Raggo kick)	Tied 7–7
2	3:49	Elon	John Gallagher 42 yard field goal	Elon 10–7
3	6:08	Delaware	Thomas Jefferson 2 yard run (Frank Raggo kick)	Delaware 14–10

- Passing leaders: Connor Christiansen (ELON): 20–34, 243 yds., 1 TD, 1 INT; Joe Walker (UD): 9–17, 77 yds.
- Rushing Leaders: Kareem Williams (UD): 18 car., 101 yds., 1 TD; Malcolm Summers (ELON): 12 car., 34 yds.
- Receiving Leaders: Tereak McCray (ELON): 4 rec., 42 yds., 1 TD; Dionte Cherry (UD): 4 rec., 40 yds.

Delaware	Statistic	Elon
12	First downs	17
7–17	3rd Down	4–12
0–1	4th Down	0–2
238	Total yards	290
77	Passing	241
9–17	Comp–Att	21–39
4.5	Avg.	6.2
0	Interceptions	2
161	Rushing	49
46	Attempts	22
3.5	Avg.	2.2
7–45	Penalties	7–60
0	Turnovers	3
0	Fumbles	1
33:05	T.O.P.	26:55

== Season statistics ==
As of November 7, 2015:

- Passing leader: Joe Walker: 58–130, 506 yds., 1 TD, 6 INT (AVG: 6.4–14.4, 56.2 yds., 0.1 TD, 0.7 INT, 3.9 YPA)
- Rushing Leader: Thomas Jefferson: 133 car., 715 yds., 6 TD (AVG: 14.8 car., 79.4 yds., 0.7 TD, 5.4 YPC)
- Receiving Leader: Diante Cherry: 23 rec., 232 yds. (AVG: 3.2 rec., 33.1 yds., 10.1 YPR)

Delaware	Statistic (Per Game Avg.)	Opponents
141 (15.7)	First downs	156 (17.3)
54–136 (6.0–15.1)	3rd Down	43–128 (4.7–14.2)
4–13 (0.4–1.4)	4th Down	13–17 (1.4–1.9)
2,596 (288.4)	Total yards	2,943 (327.0)
639 (71.0)	Passing	1,828 (203.1)
70–153 (7.8–17.0)	Comp–Att	149–264 (16.6–29.3)
4.2	Avg.	6.9
6 (0.7)	Interceptions	5 (0.6)
1,957 (217.4)	Rushing	1,115 (123.9)
429 (47.7)	Attempts	306 (34.0)
4.6	Avg.	3.6
45–421 (5.0–46.8)	Penalties	44–329 (4.9–36.6)
13 (1.4)	Turnovers	11 (1.2)
7 (0.8)	Fumbles	6 (0.7)
294:27 (32:43)	T.O.P.	245:33 (27:17)
