= Malik Reaves =

American football player (born 1995)

Profile
- Position: Cornerback

Personal information
- Born: December 15, 1995 (age 30); Panama City, Florida
- Listed height: 6 ft 0 in (1.83 m)
- Listed weight: 200 lb (91 kg)

Career information
- High school: Duncan U. Fletcher (Neptune Beach, Florida)
- College: Villanova
- NFL draft: 2018: undrafted

Career history
- Kansas City Chiefs (2018)*; Pittsburgh Steelers (2018)*; Winnipeg Blue Bombers (2019)*; Toronto Argonauts (2020)*
- * Offseason or practice squad member only

Malik Reaves (born December 15, 1995) is a professional gridiron football defensive back who is a free agent. He played college football for Villanova, where he earned all-CAA honors following his senior season.

== Early life ==
Reaves was a four-year letter winner in football and track at Duncan U. Fletcher High School where he was an all-state honoree, first-team All-Gateway Conference, and The Florida Times-Union All-First Coach Honorable Mention.

== College career ==
Reaves was fourth on the Wildcats defense in tackles in 2017 with 58 (35 solo). He finished his career with 178 tackles in 43 games for Villanova, along with 4 interceptions, 13 pass defenses, and 2 forced fumbles. Reaves earned second-team all-CAA honors twice, following his Sophomore (2015) and Senior (2017) seasons.

== Professional career ==
Reaves was ranked among the top twenty-five at his position in the 2018 NFL draft.

=== Kansas City Chiefs ===
Reaves signed with the Kansas City Chiefs as an undrafted free agent on May 8, 2018. He was waived on June 14, 2018.

=== Pittsburgh Steelers ===
On July 26, 2018, Reaves signed with the Pittsburgh Steelers. He was waived on September 1, 2019.

=== Canadian Football League ===
Reaves signed with the Winnipeg Blue Bombers on February 15, 2019. He was released before the start of the season on April 24, 2019. He signed with the Toronto Argonauts after the season on December 16, 2019, but was released on December 28, 2020.
