= Trevor Bates =

American football player (born 1993)

No. 50, 53
- Position: Linebacker

Personal information
- Born: August 28, 1993 (age 33); Portland, Maine, U.S.
- Listed height: 6 ft 1 in (1.85 m)
- Listed weight: 247 lb (112 kg)

Career information
- High school: Westbrook (ME)
- College: Maine
- NFL draft: 2016: 7th round, 239th overall pick

Career history
- Indianapolis Colts (2016); New England Patriots (2016–2017)*; New York Giants (2017)*; Detroit Lions (2018)
- * Offseason or practice squad member only

Awards and highlights
- Super Bowl champion (LI)
- Stats at Pro Football Reference

Trevor Bates (born August 28, 1993) is an American former professional football player who was a linebacker in the National Football League (NFL). He played college football for the Maine Black Bears, and was selected by the Indianapolis Colts in the seventh round of the 2016 NFL draft. He won Super Bowl LI with the New England Patriots, beating the Atlanta Falcons.

== College career ==
Bates recorded 17 sacks in his final three seasons with the Maine Black Bears. As a junior, he recorded seven pass deflections and three interceptions and was named team MVP.

== Professional career ==
=== Indianapolis Colts ===
Bates was selected in the seventh round (239th overall) of the 2016 NFL draft by the Indianapolis Colts. He signed his rookie contract with the Colts on May 5, 2016. On September 3, 2016, he was waived by the Colts as part of final roster cuts and was signed to the practice squad the next day. He was elevated to the active roster on October 4, 2016 but was released on October 13.

=== New England Patriots ===
Bates was signed to the New England Patriots' practice squad on November 7, 2016.

On February 5, 2017, Bates was part of the Patriots team that won Super Bowl LI. In the game, the Patriots defeated the Atlanta Falcons by a score of 34–28 in overtime.

On February 7, 2017, Bates signed a futures contract with the Patriots. He was waived by the Patriots on September 2, 2017 and signed to the practice squad the next day, only to be released two days later.

=== New York Giants ===
On October 31, 2017, Bates was signed to the New York Giants' practice squad. He was released on December 11, 2017.

=== Detroit Lions ===
On May 23, 2018, Bates signed with the Detroit Lions. He was waived on September 3, 2018 and was re-signed to the practice squad. He was promoted to the active roster on October 15, 2018.

On March 11, 2019, Bates was released by the Lions due to an altercation with the police.
