= DeAndre Houston-Carson =

American football player (born 1993)

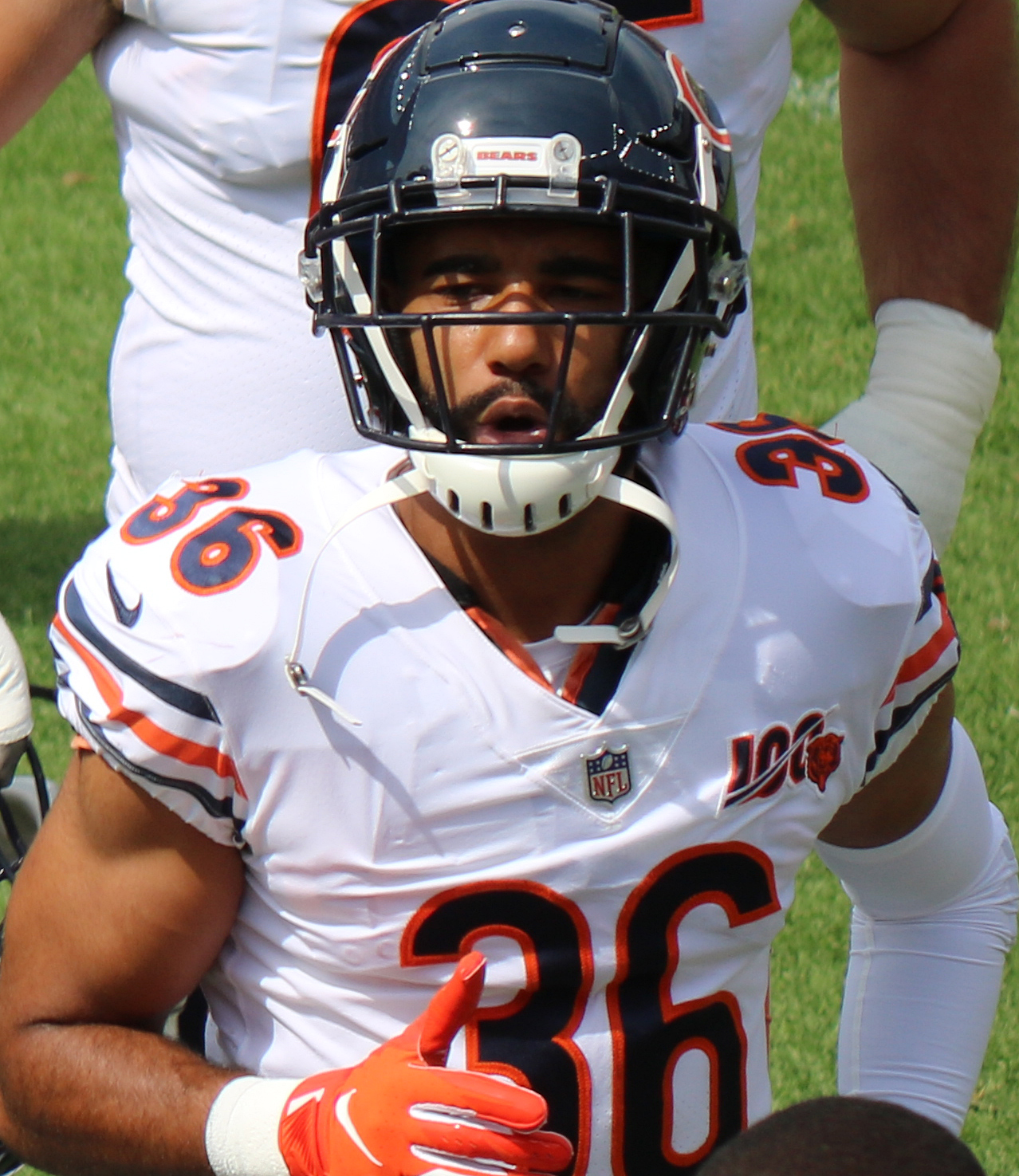
- Houston-Carson with the Chicago Bears in 2019

No. 36, 30, 45
- Position: Safety

Personal information
- Born: April 13, 1993 (age 33); Woodford, Virginia, U.S.
- Listed height: 6 ft 0 in (1.83 m)
- Listed weight: 202 lb (92 kg)

Career information
- High school: Massaponax (Fredericksburg, Virginia)
- College: William & Mary (2011–2015)
- NFL draft: 2016: 6th round, 185th overall pick

Career history
- Chicago Bears (2016–2022); Baltimore Ravens (2023)*; Houston Texans (2023); Baltimore Ravens (2023); Houston Texans (2023)
- * Offseason or practice squad member only

Career NFL statistics
- Total tackles: 180
- Forced fumbles: 3
- Fumble recoveries: 5
- Pass deflections: 13
- Interceptions: 5
- Defensive touchdowns: 1
- Stats at Pro Football Reference

DeAndre Houston-Carson (born April 13, 1993) is an American former professional football player who was a safety in the National Football League (NFL). He played college football for the William & Mary Tribe.

== Professional career ==
Pre-draft measurables
Height	Weight	Arm length	Hand span	Wingspan	40-yard dash	10-yard split	20-yard split	20-yard shuttle	Three-cone drill	Vertical jump	Broad jump	Bench press
6 ft 0 3/4 in (1.85 m)	201 lb (91 kg)	30 1/8 in (0.77 m)	9 1/8 in (0.23 m)	6 ft 3 in (1.91 m)	4.54 s	1.47 s	2.62 s	4.28 s	7.15 s	32.5 in (0.83 m)	9 ft 7 in (2.92 m)	13 reps
All values from NFL Combine

=== Chicago Bears ===
Houston-Carson was selected in the sixth round, 185th overall by the Chicago Bears in the 2016 NFL draft. On May 9, 2016, he signed a four-year contract with the Bears.

On September 2, 2017, Houston-Carson was waived by the Bears and was signed to the practice squad. He was promoted to the active roster on September 19, 2017.

After becoming a free agent following the 2018 season, he was re-signed by the Bears to a one-year deal on March 29, 2019. During the 2019 season, Houston-Carson played every game as he recorded six tackles on special teams, the third-most on the team.

On March 31, 2020, Houston-Carson was re-signed by the Bears. In Week 5 against the Tampa Bay Buccaneers on Thursday Night Football, Houston–Carson broke up a pass thrown by Tom Brady on fourth down with less than a minute left in the game to help secure a 20–19 Bears' win. In the following week's game, he intercepted a pass thrown by Teddy Bridgewater of the Carolina Panthers with 1:32 remaining in the game to seal the 23–16 Bears' victory.

Houston-Carson signed another one-year contract with the Bears on March 25, 2021. He suffered a fractured forearm in Week 14 and was placed on season-ending injured reserve on December 13, 2021.

On March 20, 2022, Houston-Carson re-signed with the Bears.

=== Baltimore Ravens (first stint) ===
On August 14, 2023, Houston-Carson signed with the Baltimore Ravens. He was released on August 28, 2023.

=== Houston Texans (first stint) ===
On September 12, 2023, Houston-Carson signed with the Houston Texans practice squad. He was promoted to the active roster on September 23. He was released on September 30.

=== Baltimore Ravens (second stint) ===
On October 3, 2023, Houston-Carson was signed to the Ravens practice squad.

=== Houston Texans (second stint) ===
On October 31, 2023, Houston-Carson was signed by the Texans off the Ravens practice squad.
