= 2015 Monmouth Hawks football team =

American college football season

2015 Monmouth Hawks football
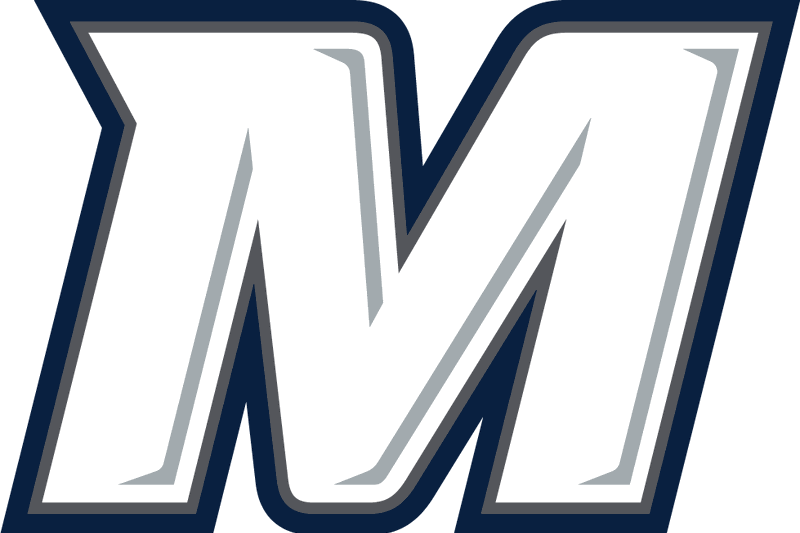
- Conference: Big South Conference
- Record: 5–6 (3–3 Big South)
- Head coach: Kevin Callahan (23rd season)
- Offensive coordinator: Kevin Morris (2nd season)
- Offensive scheme: Pro-style
- Defensive coordinator: Andy Bobik (22nd season)
- Base defense: 4–3
- Home stadium: Kessler Field

2015 Big South Conference football standings
| | Conf. | | | Overall |
| Team | W | | L | W | | L |
|---|---|---|---|---|---|---|
| No. 6 Charleston Southern $^ | 6 | – | 0 | 10 | – | 3 |
| No. 16 Coastal Carolina ^ | 4 | – | 2 | 9 | – | 3 |
| Liberty | 3 | – | 3 | 6 | – | 5 |
| Monmouth | 3 | – | 3 | 5 | – | 6 |
| Kennesaw State | 2 | – | 4 | 6 | – | 5 |
| Gardner–Webb * | 2 | – | 4 | 4 | – | 7 |
| Presbyterian | 1 | – | 5 | 2 | – | 9 |
$ – Conference champion; ^ – FCS playoff participant; * Gardner–Webb ineligible for postseason due to APR violations; Rankings from STATS Poll

The 2015 Monmouth Hawks football team represented Monmouth University in the 2015 NCAA Division I FCS football season as a members of Big South Conference. They were led by 23rd-year head coach Kevin Callahan and played their home games at Kessler Field. Monmouth finished the season 5–6 overall and 3–3 in Big South play to tie for third place.

== Schedule ==
| Date | Time | Opponent | Site | TV | Result | Attendance |
|---|---|---|---|---|---|---|
| September 5 | 1:00 p.m. | Holy Cross* | Kessler Field; West Long Branch, NJ | ESPN3 | L 19–27 | 3,081 |
| September 12 | 3:00 p.m. | at Central Michigan* | Kelly/Shorts Stadium; Mount Pleasant, MI | ESPN3 | L 10–31 | 21,092 |
| September 19 | 6:00 p.m. | at Wagner* | Wagner College Stadium; Staten Island, NY | MDN | W 31–16 | 2,812 |
| September 26 | 1:00 p.m. | at No. 16 Fordham* | Coffey Field; Bronx, NY | MDN | L 31–54 | 3,471 |
| October 3 | 1:00 p.m. | Bryant* | Kessler Field; West Long Branch, NJ | ESPN3 | W 31–24 | 1,086 |
| October 10 | 12:00 p.m. | at Charleston Southern | Buccaneer Field; Charleston, SC | BSN | L 7–37 | 1,227 |
| October 17 | 1:00 p.m. | No. 22 Liberty | Kessler Field; West Long Branch, NJ | ESPN3 | W 20–17 ^{OT} | 1,734 |
| October 24 | 1:00 p.m. | No. 2 Coastal Carolina^{†} | Kessler Field; West Long Branch, NJ | ESPN3 | L 20–23 | 4,591 |
| October 31 | 1:00 p.m. | at Kennensaw State | Fifth Third Bank Stadium; Kennesaw, GA | ESPN3 | L 13–23 | 8,668 |
| November 14 | 12:00 p.m. | Presbyterian | Kessler Field; West Long Branch, NJ | ESPN3 | W 21–16 | 1,811 |
| November 21 | 1:30 p.m. | at Gardner–Webb | Ernest W. Spangler Stadium; Boiling Springs, NC | BSN | W 23–9 | 3,742 |
*Non-conference game; ^{†}Homecoming; Rankings from STATS Poll released prior to the game; All times are in Eastern time

== Game summaries ==
=== Holy Cross ===
| | 1 | 2 | 3 | 4 | Total |
|---|---|---|---|---|---|
| Crusaders | 14 | 7 | 0 | 6 | 27 |
| Hawks | 3 | 6 | 0 | 10 | 19 |

=== At Central Michigan ===
| | 1 | 2 | 3 | 4 | Total |
|---|---|---|---|---|---|
| Hawks | 0 | 3 | 7 | 0 | 10 |
| Chippewas | 7 | 24 | 0 | 0 | 31 |

=== At Wagner ===
| | 1 | 2 | 3 | 4 | Total |
|---|---|---|---|---|---|
| Hawks | 7 | 7 | 7 | 10 | 31 |
| Seahawks | 0 | 3 | 0 | 13 | 16 |

=== At Fordham ===
| | 1 | 2 | 3 | 4 | Total |
|---|---|---|---|---|---|
| Hawks | 3 | 14 | 7 | 7 | 31 |
| #16 Rams | 14 | 21 | 13 | 6 | 54 |

=== Bryant ===
| | 1 | 2 | 3 | 4 | Total |
|---|---|---|---|---|---|
| Bulldogs | 0 | 14 | 2 | 8 | 24 |
| Hawks | 14 | 0 | 3 | 14 | 31 |

=== At Charleston Southern ===
| | 1 | 2 | 3 | 4 | Total |
|---|---|---|---|---|---|
| Hawks | 0 | 0 | 0 | 7 | 7 |
| Buccaneers | 7 | 9 | 14 | 7 | 37 |

=== Liberty ===
| | 1 | 2 | 3 | 4 | OT | Total |
|---|---|---|---|---|---|---|
| #22 Flames | 0 | 0 | 0 | 17 | 0 | 17 |
| Hawks | 0 | 7 | 0 | 10 | 3 | 20 |

=== Coastal Carolina ===
| | 1 | 2 | 3 | 4 | Total |
|---|---|---|---|---|---|
| #2 Chanticleers | 3 | 14 | 3 | 3 | 23 |
| Hawks | 7 | 6 | 7 | 0 | 20 |

=== At Kennesaw State ===
| | 1 | 2 | 3 | 4 | Total |
|---|---|---|---|---|---|
| Hawks | 7 | 0 | 0 | 6 | 13 |
| Owls | 0 | 16 | 7 | 0 | 23 |

=== Presbyterian ===
| | 1 | 2 | 3 | 4 | Total |
|---|---|---|---|---|---|
| Blue Hose | 3 | 7 | 0 | 6 | 16 |
| Hawks | 0 | 7 | 14 | 0 | 21 |

=== At Gardner–Webb ===
| | 1 | 2 | 3 | 4 | Total |
|---|---|---|---|---|---|
| Hawks | 14 | 0 | 7 | 2 | 23 |
| Runnin' Bulldogs | 0 | 3 | 6 | 0 | 9 |
