= 2015 Kennesaw State Owls football team =

American college football season

2015 Kennesaw State Owls football
- Conference: Big South Conference
- Record: 6–5 (2–4 Big South)
- Head coach: Brian Bohannon (1st season)
- Offensive coordinator: Grant Chesnut (1st season)
- Offensive scheme: Flexbone option
- Defensive coordinator: Brian Newberry (1st season)
- Base defense: 4–2–5
- Home stadium: Fifth Third Bank Stadium

2015 Big South Conference football standings
	Conf.			Overall
Team	W		L	W		L
No. 6 Charleston Southern $^	6	–	0	10	–	3
No. 16 Coastal Carolina ^	4	–	2	9	–	3
Liberty	3	–	3	6	–	5
Monmouth	3	–	3	5	–	6
Kennesaw State	2	–	4	6	–	5
Gardner–Webb *	2	–	4	4	–	7
Presbyterian	1	–	5	2	–	9
$ – Conference champion; ^ – FCS playoff participant; * Gardner–Webb ineligible for postseason due to APR violations; Rankings from STATS Poll

The 2015 Kennesaw State Owls football team represented Kennesaw State University in the 2015 NCAA Division I FCS football season. They were led by first-year head coach Brian Bohannon and played their home games at Fifth Third Bank Stadium. They were first year members of the Big South Conference. This was the Owls inaugural season of intercollegiate football. They finished the season 6–5, 2–4 in Big South play to finish in a tie for fifth place.

== Schedule ==
Date	Time	Opponent	Site	TV	Result	Attendance
September 3	7:30 pm	at East Tennessee State*	Kermit Tipton Stadium; Johnston City, TN		W 56–16	8,217
September 12	4:00 pm	Edward Waters*	Fifth Third Bank Stadium; Kennesaw, GA	WUPA	W 58–7	9,506
September 19	1:00 pm	Shorter*	Fifth Third Bank Stadium; Kennesaw, GA	BSN	W 18–10	8,664
September 26	6:00 pm	at Dayton*	Welcome Stadium; Dayton, OH		L 27–31	2,512
October 10	1:00 pm	Point*^{†}	Fifth Third Bank Stadium; Kennesaw, GA	BSN	W 56–17	8,300
October 17	1:00 pm	Gardner–Webb	Fifth Third Bank Stadium; Kennesaw, GA	ESPN3	W 12–7	8,300
October 24	7:00 pm	at Liberty	Williams Stadium; Lynchburg, VA	WUPA	L 35–45	20,393
October 31	1:00 pm	Monmouth	Fifth Third Bank Stadium; Kennesaw, GA	ESPN3	W 23–13	8,668
November 7	1:00 pm	No. 15 Charleston Southern	Fifth Third Bank Stadium; Kennesaw, GA	BSN	L 14–28	8,670
November 14	2:00 pm	at No. 4 Coastal Carolina	Brooks Stadium; Conway, SC	BSN	L 13–45	8,802
November 21	2:00 pm	at Presbyterian	Bailey Memorial Stadium; Clinton, SC	BSN	L 6–14	3,577
*Non-conference game; ^{†}Homecoming; Rankings from STATS FCS Poll released prior to game Poll released prior to the game; All times are in Eastern time

- Source: Schedule

== Personnel ==
2015 Kennesaw State Owls football team roster
Players
Coaches
Offense

Pos.	#	Name	Class
QB	2	Zach Buchan	Fr
QB	3	Chandler Burks	Fr
QB	4	Jake McKenzie	Fr
WR	5	Prentice Stone	Sr
QB	6	Jantzen Jeffrey	So
RB	8	T. J. Reed	Fr
QB	10	Trey White	Jr
RB	13	Ryan Godhigh	Sr
RB	14	Chaston Bennett	Jr
WR	15	Justin Sumpter	Fr
WR	16	Xavier Harper	Fr
RB	21	Micah Reed	Jr
RB	22	Trey Chivers	Fr
RB	27	Joseph Alexander	Fr
RB	29	Steven Johnson	Jr
RB	32	Jae Bowen	Fr
RB	33	Darnell Holland	Fr
RB	34	Jonah Huff	Fr
RB	34	Myles White	Jr
RB	36	Che Darious Robinson	Jr
RB	37	Michael McIntire	Fr
RB	38	Devon Rosser	Fr
RB	42	Jonah Doster	Fr
RB	43	Michael Willis	Jr
RB	45	Cameron Blackburn	So
RB	46	Randy Nails	Fr
RB	47	Kevin Ficklin	Fr

Defense

Pos.	#	Name	Class
DB	1	Chance McNulty	Jr
LB	7	Johnny Yoder	Jr
DB	9	Keon Roman	Jr
DB	11	Cymeon Burden	Fr
DB	12	Derrick Farrow	Jr
DB	17	Phillip Staples	Jr
DB	18	Shawn Reynolds	Fr
DB	19	Cole Crenshaw	Fr
DB	20	Raekwon Chatman	Fr
DB	23	Dante Blackmon	Jr
DB	24	Marcus Thurman	Fr
DB	25	Jace White	Fr
DB	26	Taylor Henkle	Fr
DB	28	Will Cape	Fr
DB	30	Terrence Williams	Jr
DB	31	Williams Flowers	Fr
DB	35	Raymone Jennings	Fr
DB	39	Nicolas Snowden	Fr
DL	40	Dustyn Moore	So
LB	41	Anthony Gore Jr.	Fr
LB	42	Peter Rohan	Fr
DL	43	Justin Elim	Fr
LB	44	Dez Billingslea	Fr
LB	45	Keagan Jordan	Fr
DB	46	Terrance Bulock Jr.	So
LB	47	Warren McWilliams	Fr
LB	48	Zach Taisler	Fr
LB	49	Izzy Sam	So

Special teams

Pos.	#	Name	Class
P	19	Hunter Smith	Fr
P	30	Mason Gann	Fr
LS	60	Austin Brown	Fr
LS	61	Drew McCracken	Fr
K	83	Jordan Genovese	Fr
K	86	Justin Thompson	Fr
P	88	Josh Boham	Fr

Head coach

- Brian Bohannon

Coordinators/assistant coaches

- Grant Chestnut
  Offensive coordinator/offensive line
- Brian Newberry
  Defensive coordinator/secondary
- Chris Bland
  Cornerbacks
- Shane Bowen
  Linebackers
- Stewart Cook
  Tight ends/tackles
- Mike Daniels
  Wide receivers
- Kevin Downing
  Defensive ends
- Tim Glanton
  Special teams coordinator/running backs
- Liam Klein
  Recruiting coordinator/defensive line
- Cody Worley
  Quarterbacks
- Jim Kiritsy
  Strength and conditioning

Legend

- (C) Team captain
- (S) Suspended
- (I) Ineligible
- Injured
- Redshirt

Roster
Last update: May 6, 2025

== Game summaries ==
=== At East Tennessee State ===
Kennesaw State at East Tennessee State

Team	1	2	3	4	Total
• Owls	7	14	21	14	56
Buccaneers	3	10	0	3	16

- Date: September 3
- Location: Kermit Tipton Stadium
  Johnston City, TN
- Game start: 7:30 PM EDT
- Elapsed time: 2:56
- Game attendance: 8,217
- Game weather: 81 °F (27 °C) • Wind SW 2 mph (3.2 km/h) • Fair
- Referee: Bob Johnson

Statistics	KENN	ETSU
First downs	18	19
Total yards	512	328
Rushing yards	416	98
Passing yards	96	230
Turnovers	1	2
Time of possession	26:31	33:29

Team	Category	Player	Statistics
Kennesaw State	Passing	Trey White	2/6, 96 yards, TD
Kennesaw State	Rushing	Trey White	16 rushes, 95 yards, TD
Kennesaw State	Receiving	Justin Sumpter	2 receptions, 96 yards, TD
East Tennessee State	Passing	Austin Herink	14/22, 132 yards
East Tennessee State	Rushing	Jajuan Stinson	7 rushes, 34 yards, TD
East Tennessee State	Receiving	Demetrius Anthony	5 receptions, 58 yards

=== Edward Waters ===
Edward Waters at Kennesaw State

Team	1	2	3	4	Total
Tigers	0	0	0	7	7
• Owls	35	17	6	0	58

- Date: September 12
- Location: Fifth Third Bank Stadium
  Kennesaw, GA
- Game start: 4:00 PM EDT
- Elapsed time: 2:40
- Game attendance: 9,506
- Game weather: 81 °F (27 °C) • Partly Cloudy
- Referee: Steve Fleming
- Television network: WUPA

Statistics	EDW	KENN
First downs	5	18
Total yards	201	398
Rushing yards	160	328
Passing yards	41	70
Turnovers	4	0
Time of possession	30:49	34:11

Team	Category	Player	Statistics
Edward Waters	Passing	Dennis Jackson	4/11, 41 yards, TD, INT
Edward Waters	Rushing	Ray Dukes	11 rushes, 92 yards
Edward Waters	Receiving	Ray Dukes	2 receptions, 30 yards, TD
Kennesaw State	Passing	Trey White	2/3, 70 yards, TD
Kennesaw State	Rushing	Trey White	13 rushes, 85 yards, 3 TD
Kennesaw State	Receiving	Justin Sumpter	1 reception, 55 yards, TD

=== Shorter ===
Shorter at Kennesaw State

Team	1	2	3	4	Total
Hawks	0	10	0	0	10
• Owls	6	0	3	9	18

- Date: September 19
- Location: Fifth Third Bank Stadium
  Kennesaw, GA
- Game start: 1:00 PM EDT
- Elapsed time: 2:41
- Game attendance: 8,664
- Game weather: 88 °F (31 °C) • Sunny
- Referee: Jeff Heaser
- Television network: BSN

Statistics	SHO	KENN
First downs	9	22
Total yards	162	417
Rushing yards	27	231
Passing yards	135	186
Turnovers	2	2
Time of possession	22:45	37:15

Team	Category	Player	Statistics
Shorter	Passing	Aaron Bryant	8/11, 135 yards, INT
Shorter	Rushing	B. J. McCoy	10 rushes, 22 yards
Shorter	Receiving	Cody Simpson	3 receptions, 72 yards
Kennesaw State	Passing	Trey White	9/16, 186 yards, INT
Kennesaw State	Rushing	Micah Reed	26 rushes, 100 yards
Kennesaw State	Receiving	Justin Sumpter	5 receptions, 121 yards

=== At Dayton ===
Kennesaw State at Dayton

Team	1	2	3	4	Total
Owls	13	14	0	0	27
• Flyers	7	14	7	3	31

- Date: September 26
- Location: Welcome Stadium
  Dayton, OH
- Game start: 6:00 PM EDT
- Elapsed time: 2:45
- Game attendance: 2,512
- Game weather: 71 °F (22 °C) • Wind ESE 12 mph (19 km/h) • Cloudy
- Referee: Warren Gillis

Statistics	KENN	DAY
First downs	18	25
Total yards	388	403
Rushing yards	342	287
Passing yards	46	116
Turnovers	2	2
Time of possession	28:23	31:37

Team	Category	Player	Statistics
Kennesaw State	Passing	Trey White	3/10, 46 yards, 2 INT
Kennesaw State	Rushing	Chaston Bennett	8 rushes, 155 yards, TD
Kennesaw State	Receiving	Jae Bowen	2 receptions, 37 yards
Dayton	Passing	Alex Jeske	9/16, 116 yards, TD, 2 INT
Dayton	Rushing	Connor Kacsor	44 rushes, 229 yards, 3 TD
Dayton	Receiving	Tyler Tumpane	3 receptions, 42 yards

=== Point ===
Point at Kennesaw State

Team	1	2	3	4	Total
Skyhawks	0	10	0	7	17
• Owls	7	28	14	7	56

- Date: October 10
- Location: Fifth Third Bank Stadium
  Kennesaw, GA
- Game start: 1:00 PM EDT
- Elapsed time: 2:52
- Game attendance: 8,300
- Game weather: 70 °F (21 °C) • Breezy • Partly Cloudy/Rainy
- Referee: Penn Wagers
- Television network: BSN

Statistics	POINT	KENN
First downs	15	32
Total yards	340	699
Rushing yards	127	391
Passing yards	213	308
Turnovers	1	1
Time of possession	23:10	36:50

Team	Category	Player	Statistics
Point	Passing	Charles Fortis	14/25, 213 yards, TD, INT
Point	Rushing	Christian Williams	9 rushes, 47 yards
Point	Receiving	Connor Reed	1 reception, 86 yards, TD
Kennesaw State	Passing	Trey White	9/14, 239 yards, 3 TD
Kennesaw State	Rushing	Chaston Bennett	8 rushes, 70 yards, 2 TD
Kennesaw State	Receiving	Chaston Bennett	2 receptions, 90 yards, TD

=== Gardner–Webb ===
Gardner–Webb at Kennesaw State

Team	1	2	3	4	Total
Runnin' Bulldogs	0	0	0	7	7
• Owls	3	3	0	6	12

- Date: October 17
- Location: Fifth Third Bank Stadium
  Kennesaw, GA
- Game start: 1:00 PM EDT
- Elapsed time: 2:57
- Game attendance: 8,300
- Game weather: 61 °F (16 °C) • Breezy • Sunny
- Referee: Ron Cherry
- Television network: ESPN3

Statistics	WEBB	KENN
First downs	11	20
Total yards	200	353
Rushing yards	127	239
Passing yards	73	114
Turnovers	1	0
Time of possession	21:20	38:40

Team	Category	Player	Statistics
Gardner–Webb	Passing	Tyrell Maxwell	8/21, 73 yards, INT
Gardner–Webb	Rushing	Tyrell Maxwell	15 rushes, 67 yards
Gardner–Webb	Receiving	Jacob Henderson	3 receptions, 45 yards
Kennesaw State	Passing	Trey White	9/17, 114 yards
Kennesaw State	Rushing	Trey White	34 rushes, 170 yards
Kennesaw State	Receiving	Justin Sumpter	5 receptions, 70 yards

=== At Liberty ===
Kennesaw State at Liberty

Team	1	2	3	4	Total
Owls	7	0	7	21	35
• Flames	7	17	7	14	45

- Date: October 24
- Location: Williams Stadium
  Lynchburg, VA
- Game start: 7:00 PM EDT
- Elapsed time: 3:03
- Game attendance: 20,393
- Game weather: 59 °F (15 °C) • S 3 mph (4.8 km/h) • Pleasant/Seasonal
- Referee: Riley Johnson
- Television network: WUPA

Statistics	KENN	LIB
First downs	28	19
Total yards	420	406
Rushing yards	292	175
Passing yards	128	231
Turnovers	0	0
Time of possession	36:42	23:18

Team	Category	Player	Statistics
Kennesaw State	Passing	Trey White	5/8, 71 yards, TD
Kennesaw State	Rushing	Trey Chivers	14 rushes, 97 yards
Kennesaw State	Receiving	Justin Sumpter	4 receptions, 61 yards
Liberty	Passing	Josh Woodrum	15/21, 230 yards, 4 TD
Liberty	Rushing	Todd Macon	8 rushes, 81 yards, TD
Liberty	Receiving	Darrin Peterson	4 receptions, 164 yards, 3 TD

=== Monmouth ===
Monmouth at Kennesaw State

Team	1	2	3	4	Total
Hawks	7	0	0	6	13
• Owls	0	16	7	0	23

- Date: October 31
- Location: Fifth Third Bank Stadium
  Kennesaw, GA
- Game start: 1:00 PM EDT
- Elapsed time: 2:55
- Game attendance: 8,668
- Game weather: 65 °F (18 °C) • Breezy • Overcast
- Referee: Riley Johnson
- Television network: ESPN3

Statistics	MONM	KENN
First downs	20	23
Total yards	321	455
Rushing yards	187	341
Passing yards	134	114
Turnovers	2	1
Time of possession	24:09	35:51

Team	Category	Player	Statistics
Monmouth	Passing	Cody Williams	13/25, 134 yards, 2 TD, 2 INT
Monmouth	Rushing	Zach Welch	16 rushes, 112 yards
Monmouth	Receiving	Ugo Ezemma	3 receptions, 52 yards, TD
Kennesaw State	Passing	Trey White	7/14, 114 yards, TD, INT
Kennesaw State	Rushing	Chaston Bennett	6 rushes, 124 yards
Kennesaw State	Receiving	Jae Bowen	3 receptions, 41 yards, TD

=== No. 15 Charleston Southern ===
Charleston Southern at Kennesaw State

Team	1	2	3	4	Total
• No. 15 Buccaneers	7	14	7	0	28
Owls	6	0	0	8	14

- Date: November 7
- Location: Fifth Third Bank Stadium
  Kennesaw, GA
- Game start: 1:00 PM EST
- Elapsed time: 2:56
- Game attendance: 8,670
- Game weather: 65 °F (18 °C) • Breezy • Rainy
- Referee: Jeff Heaser
- Television network: BSN

Statistics	CHSO	KENN
First downs	20	13
Total yards	314	302
Rushing yards	181	113
Passing yards	133	189
Turnovers	2	1
Time of possession	33:36	26:24

Team	Category	Player	Statistics
Charleston Southern	Passing	Austin Brown	11/21, 133 yards, TD, 2 INT
Charleston Southern	Rushing	Darius Hammond	10 rushes, 66 yards, TD
Charleston Southern	Receiving	Nathan Perera	4 receptions, 42 yards
Kennesaw State	Passing	Jake McKenzie	8/15, 103 yards
Kennesaw State	Rushing	Jake McKenzie	10 rushes, 43 yards, TD
Kennesaw State	Receiving	Chaston Bennett	2 receptions, 86 yards, TD

=== At No. 4 Coastal Carolina ===
Kennesaw State at Coastal Carolina

Team	1	2	3	4	Total
Owls	6	0	7	0	13
• No. 4 Chanticleers	13	18	7	7	45

- Date: November 14
- Location: Brooks Stadium
  Conway, SC
- Game start: 2:00 PM EST
- Elapsed time: 2:56
- Game attendance: 8,802
- Game weather: 62 °F (17 °C) • Wind NNW 7–10 miles per hour (11–16 km/h) • Sunny/Clear
- Referee: Tracey Lynch
- Television network: BSN

Statistics	KENN	CCAR
First downs	22	24
Total yards	433	451
Rushing yards	259	189
Passing yards	174	262
Turnovers	2	1
Time of possession	32:58	27:02

Team	Category	Player	Statistics
Kennesaw State	Passing	Jake McKenzie	8/20, 136 yards
Kennesaw State	Rushing	Jake McKenzie	23 rushes, 85 yards
Kennesaw State	Receiving	Justin Sumpter	3 receptions, 50 yards, TD
Coastal Carolina	Passing	Alex Ross	20/27, 262 yards, 5 TD
Coastal Carolina	Rushing	De'Angelo Henderson	18 rushes, 103 yards, TD
Coastal Carolina	Receiving	Chris Jones	6 receptions, 131 yards, 2 TD

=== At Presbyterian ===
Kennesaw State at Presbyterian

Team	1	2	3	4	Total
Owls	0	3	0	3	6
• Blue Hose	0	7	0	7	14

- Date: November 21
- Location: Bailey Memorial Stadium
  Clinton, SC
- Game start: 2:00 PM EST
- Elapsed time: 2:47
- Game attendance: 3,577
- Game weather: 56 °F (13 °C) • Wind E 5 mph (8.0 km/h) • Mostly Cloudy
- Referee: Gary Patterson
- Television network: BSN

Statistics	KENN	PRE
First downs	19	7
Total yards	351	187
Rushing yards	271	130
Passing yards	80	57
Turnovers	4	1
Time of possession	30:34	29:26

Team	Category	Player	Statistics
Kennesaw State	Passing	Jake McKenzie	3/11, 43 yards
Kennesaw State	Rushing	Trey White	31 rushes, 155 yards
Kennesaw State	Receiving	Chaston Bennett	1 reception, 37 yards
Presbyterian	Passing	Ben Cheek	4/7, 57 yards, TD, INT
Presbyterian	Rushing	Darrell Bridges	19 rushes, 134 yards
Presbyterian	Receiving	Daryl Wilson	1 reception, 46 yards
