= 2015 East Tennessee State Buccaneers football team =

American college football season

2015 East Tennessee State Buccaneers football
- Conference: Independent
- Record: 2–9
- Head coach: Carl Torbush (1st season)
- Offensive coordinator: Mike O'Cain (1st season)
- Defensive coordinator: Billy Taylor (1st season)
- Home stadium: Kermit Tipton Stadium

2015 NCAA Division I FCS independents football standings
	Conf.			Overall
Team	W		L	W		L
East Tennessee State		–		2	–	9

The 2015 East Tennessee State Buccaneers football team represented East Tennessee State University in the 2015 NCAA Division I FCS football season. They were led by first-year head coach Carl Torbush. The 2015 season was their first season since 2003, when the program was discontinued. They played their home games at Kermit Tipton Stadium, located on the campus of Science Hill High School. For the 2015 season, the Buccaneers were classified as an FCS independent school, meaning they had no athletic conference affiliation in football for the season. However, they will become football members of the Southern Conference in 2016, a league that ETSU rejoined for non-football sports in 2014 after a nine-year absence. They finished the season 2–9 with wins over Warner and Kentucky Wesleyan.

== Schedule ==
Date	Time	Opponent	Site	TV	Result	Attendance
September 3	7:30 pm	Kennesaw State	Kermit Tipton Stadium; Johnson City, TN		L 16–56	8,217
September 10	7:30 pm	Maryville	Kermit Tipton Stadium; Johnson City, TN		L 21–28	7,357
September 17	7:00 pm	at Charleston Southern	Buccaneer Field; North Charleston, SC		L 7–47	2,331
September 26	1:30 pm	Emory & Henry^{†}	Kermit Tipton Stadium; Johnson City, TN		L 24–27	8,413
October 3	1:00 pm	Saint Francis (PA)	Kermit Tipton Stadium; Johnson City, TN		L 9–58	6,000
October 17	4:00 pm	at Mercer	Moye Complex; Macon, GA	ESPN3	L 0–52	10,200
October 24	4:35 pm	at No. 21 Montana State	Bobcat Stadium; Bozeman, MT		L 7–63	18,617
October 31	1:00 pm	Warner	Kermit Tipton Stadium; Johnson City, TN		W 42–9	6,480
November 7	12:00 pm	at Robert Morris	Joe Walton Stadium; Moon Township, PA		L 9–21	1,174
November 14	1:30 pm	at Gardner–Webb	Ernest W. Spangler Stadium; Boiling Springs, NC		L 3–28	3,945
November 21	1:00 pm	Kentucky Wesleyan	Kermit Tipton Stadium; Johnson City, TN		W 42–27	6,302
^{†}Homecoming; Rankings from STATS Poll released prior to the game; All times are in Eastern time

== Game summaries ==
=== Kennesaw State ===
	1	2	3	4	Total
Owls	7	14	21	14	56
Buccaneers	3	10	0	3	16

=== Maryville College ===
	1	2	3	4	Total
Scots	7	0	14	7	28
Buccaneers	14	7	0	0	21

=== At Charleston Southern ===
	1	2	3	4	Total
ETSU Buccaneers	0	0	0	7	7
CSU Buccaneers	0	34	6	7	47

=== Emory & Henry ===
	1	2	3	4	Total
Wasps	7	7	6	7	27
Buccaneers	14	3	0	7	24

=== Saint Francis ===
	1	2	3	4	Total
Red Flash	17	21	6	14	58
Buccaneers	2	0	0	7	9

=== At Mercer ===
	1	2	3	4	Total
Buccaneers	0	0	0	0	0
Bears	14	21	14	3	52

=== At Montana State ===
	1	2	3	4	Total
Buccaneers	0	0	0	7	7
#21 Bobcats	13	22	14	14	63

=== Warner ===
	1	2	3	4	Total
Royals	0	0	0	9	9
Buccaneers	21	7	7	7	42

=== At Robert Morris ===
	1	2	3	4	Total
Buccaneers	0	6	3	0	9
Colonials	0	7	0	14	21

=== At Gardner-Webb ===
	1	2	3	4	Total
Buccaneers	0	3	0	0	3
Runnin' Bulldogs	7	14	0	7	28

=== Kentucky Wesleyan ===
	1	2	3	4	Total
Panthers	0	7	14	6	27
Buccaneers	7	7	14	14	42

== Roster and staff ==
2015 East Tennessee State Buccaneers football team roster
Players
Coaches
Offense

Pos.	#	Name	Class
WR	2	Hank Black	Fr
QB	3	Cullen Lavoi	Jr
QB	3	Chris Howard	Fr
QB	7	Austin Herink	Fr
WR	9	Drake Powell	Fr
WR	10	Demetrius Anthony	Fr
QB	12	Dylan Wieger	Fr
QB	13	Matt Williams	Fr
TE	14	Jared White	Fr
WR	16	Dalton Ponchillia	So
WR	17	Jovany Aris	So
WR	18	Malik Styles	Fr
QB	19	Nick Sexton	Fr
RB	20	Jajuan Lankford	Fr
RB	20	Brett Whitlow	Fr
WR	21	Jack Shoulders	Fr
WR	24	Adam Mitchell	Fr
RB	26	Artevius Smith	Fr
RB	29	Falon Lee	So
RB	30	Cory Colder	Fr
RB	33	Jajuan Stinson	Fr
FB	35	Austin Hayworth	Fr
WR	38	Chad Pritchard	Jr
RB	41	Matt Thompson	Fr
FB	42	Courtney Heard	So
RB	43	Matt Fox	Fr
RB	47	Tony Drew	Fr
RB	48	Cole Notgrass	Fr
TE	49	Tyrus Rollins	So
OL	56	Josh Pendleton	Fr
OL	57	Matt Pyke	Fr
OL	58	Greg McCloud	Fr
OL	59	Brent Rathbone	Fr
OL	60	Micah Cale	Fr
OL	62	Mason McNutt	Fr
OL	63	Matt Howard	Fr
OL	64	Chris Wheeler	Fr
OL	65	Ben Blackmon	Fr
OL	67	Myles Smith	Fr
OL	68	Caleb LaFleur	Fr
OL	70	Kevin McConnell	Fr
OL	71	Asley Haynes	Fr
OL	74	Matt Brewer	Fr
OL	75	Patrick McFall	Fr
OL	76	Cody Cornelius	Fr
OL	77	Garrett Curtis	Fr
OL	78	Sammy Hall	Jr
WR	80	Hunter Wike	Fr
TE	81	Stephen Antonelli	So
TE	82	Jack DeFur	Fr
WR	83	Connor York	Fr
WR	84	Justin Gilliam	Fr
WR	86	Kobe Kelley	Fr
TE	87	Dylan Dockery	Fr
WR	88	Charlie Moore	So
WR	89	Anthony Spagnoletti	Fr

Defense

Pos.	#	Name	Class
DB	1	Domenique Williams	Fr
S	4	Kevin Ferguson	Fr
DB	5	Tony Welch	Fr
DB	6	Keanu James	Fr
LB	8	River Boruff	Fr
S	10	Christian Gibson	Fr
LB	11	Austin Mosier	Fr
DB	13	Jacob Samsel	Fr
DB	14	Seth Barger	Fr
LB	15	DeAngelo Holt	Fr
S	16	Brock Beeler	Fr
CB	18	Andrew Heyward	Fr
S	20	Bryce Suber	Fr
S	22	Charlie Jackson	Fr
S	23	Cole West	Fr
DB	24	Alonzo Francois	Fr
DB	25	Daren Ardis	So
DB	26	Toy'Shaun Winton	Fr
DB	27	Tavian Lott	Fr
LB	28	Kahlil Mitchell	Fr
LB	31	Austin Gatewood	Fr
LB	32	Jason Maduafokwa	Fr
DB	35	Terry Tiller	Fr
S	36	Austin Jackson	Fr
LB	37	Cameron Kuerschen	Fr
LB	40	Dylan Weigel	Fr
LB	44	Jack Jones	Fr
DL	45	Nasir Player	Fr
DL	50	Joe Dossett	Fr
LB	51	Haddon Hill	Fr
LB	52	Spencer Brien	Fr
DL	52	Kendall Lawrence	Fr
LB	53	Trey Quillin	Fr
LB	54	Logan Lacey	Fr
DL	55	Devon Johnson	Fr
LB	56	Tate Brown	Fr
DL	61	Leon Humphrey	Fr
DL	72	Chris Kacprowski	Fr
DL	73	Colt Jenkins	Fr
DL	79	Adam Mullins	Fr
DL	90	Ferguierson Charles	So
DL	91	Chris Bouyer	Fr
DL	92	Joe Pittman	Fr
DL	93	Royce Turnbull	So
LB	94	Taylor Dollar	Fr
DL	95	Myles Taylor	Fr
DL	97	Tremond Ferrell	Fr
DL	98	Michael Scates	Fr
DL	99	Paul Leveritt	Fr

Special teams

Pos.	#	Name	Class
K	46	Marion Watson	Fr
LS	66	Tyler Gilliam	Fr
LS	71	Dustin Nickle	Fr
K	85	JJ Jerman	Fr
K	95	Gray Mumpower	Fr
K	96	Landon Kunak	Fr

Head coach

- Carl Torbush

Coordinators/assistant coaches

- Mike O'Cain (Offensive Coordinator)
- Gary Downs (Running Backs)
- Erik Losey (Offensive line)
- Mike Rader (Wide receivers/Recruiting Coordinator)
- Billy Taylor (Defensive Coordinator/Recruiting Coordinator)
- Scott Brumett (Defensive Line)
- Teddy Gaines (Defensive back/Special teams)
- Antonio Goss (Outside linebackers/Special teams)
- Steve McGill (Defensive Line)

Legend

- (C) Team captain
- (S) Suspended
- (I) Ineligible
- Injured
- Redshirt

Roster
Last update: September 20, 2015

Note: Most redshirt players practiced with the team during 2014 during the program's first signed class. That first signed class is redshirted while they practice entirely during the 2014 season.
