= 2015 Gardner–Webb Runnin' Bulldogs football team =

American college football season

2015 Gardner–Webb Runnin' Bulldogs football
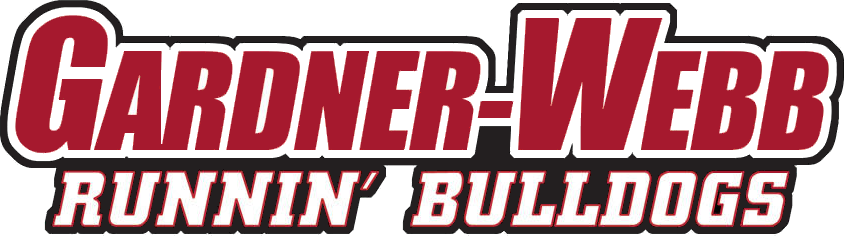
- Conference: Big South Conference
- Record: 4–7 (2–4 Big South)
- Head coach: Carroll McCray (3rd season)
- Offensive coordinator: Brett Nichols (1st season)
- Defensive coordinator: Randall McCray (3rd season)
- Home stadium: Ernest W. Spangler Stadium

2015 Big South Conference football standings
	Conf.			Overall
Team	W		L	W		L
No. 6 Charleston Southern $^	6	–	0	10	–	3
No. 16 Coastal Carolina ^	4	–	2	9	–	3
Liberty	3	–	3	6	–	5
Monmouth	3	–	3	5	–	6
Kennesaw State	2	–	4	6	–	5
Gardner–Webb *	2	–	4	4	–	7
Presbyterian	1	–	5	2	–	9
$ – Conference champion; ^ – FCS playoff participant; * Gardner–Webb ineligible for postseason due to APR violations; Rankings from STATS Poll

The 2015 Gardner–Webb Runnin' Bulldogs football team represented Gardner–Webb University as a member of the Big South Conference during the 2015 NCAA Division I FCS football season. Led by third-year head coach Carroll McCray, the Runnin' Bulldogs compiled an overall record of 4–7 with a mark of 2–4 in conference play, tying for fifth place in the Big South. Gardner–Webb played home games at Ernest W. Spangler Stadium in Boiling Springs, North Carolina.

== Schedule ==
Date	Time	Opponent	Site	TV	Result	Attendance
September 5	6:00 pm	at South Alabama*	Ladd–Peebles Stadium; Mobile, AL	ESPN3	L 23–33	12,289
September 12	6:00 pm	Elon*	Ernest W. Spangler Stadium; Boiling Springs, NC	BSN	L 13–21 ^{3OT}	5,450
September 19	6:00 pm	Virginia Union*	Ernest W. Spangler Stadium; Boiling Springs, NC	BSN	W 13–9	3,450
September 26	7:00 pm	at Wofford*	Gibbs Stadium; Spartanburg, SC	SDN	L 0–16	6,932
October 10	7:00 pm	No. 15 Liberty^{†}	Ernest W. Spangler Stadium; Boiling Springs, NC	ASN	W 34–20	3,545
October 17	1:00 pm	at Kennesaw State	Fifth Third Bank Stadium; Kennesaw, GA	ESPN3	L 7–12	8,300
October 24	1:30 pm	Charleston Southern	Ernest W. Spangler Stadium; Boiling Springs, NC	BSN	L 0–34	3,159
October 31	2:00 pm	at Presbyterian	Bailey Memorial Stadium; Clinton, SC	BSN	W 14–10	3,163
November 7	2:00 pm	at No. 8 Coastal Carolina	Brooks Stadium; Conway, SC	ASN	L 0–46	8,422
November 14	1:30 pm	East Tennessee State*	Ernest W. Spangler Stadium; Boiling Springs, NC	BSN	W 28–3	3,945
November 21	1:30 pm	Monmouth	Ernest W. Spangler Stadium; Boiling Springs, NC	BSN	L 9–23	3,742
*Non-conference game; ^{†}Homecoming; Rankings from STATS Poll released prior to the game; All times are in Eastern time

== Game summaries ==
=== At South Alabama ===
	1	2	3	4	Total
Runnin' Bulldogs	0	9	7	7	23
Jaguars	13	0	10	10	33

=== Elon ===
	1	2	3	4	OT	2OT	3OT	Total
Phoenix	0	0	7	0	3	3	8	21
Runnin' Bulldogs	0	0	0	7	3	3	0	13

=== Virginia Union ===
	1	2	3	4	Total
Panthers	0	0	2	7	9
Runnin' Bulldogs	0	10	0	3	13

=== At Wofford ===
	1	2	3	4	Total
Runnin' Bulldogs	0	0	0	0	0
Terriers	6	7	0	3	16

=== Liberty ===
	1	2	3	4	Total
#15 Flames	0	10	10	0	20
Runnin' Bulldogs	14	13	0	7	34

=== At Kennesaw State ===
	1	2	3	4	Total
Runnin' Bulldogs	0	0	0	7	7
Owls	3	3	0	6	12

=== Charleston Southern ===
	1	2	3	4	Total
Buccaneers	7	14	13	0	34
Runnin' Bulldogs	0	0	0	0	0

=== At Presbyterian ===
	1	2	3	4	Total
Runnin' Bulldogs	0	7	7	0	14
Blue Hose	0	7	0	3	10

=== At Coastal Carolina ===
	1	2	3	4	Total
Runnin' Bulldogs	0	0	0	0	0
#8 Chanticleers	15	14	14	3	46

=== East Tennessee State ===
	1	2	3	4	Total
Buccaneers	0	3	0	0	3
Runnin' Bulldogs	7	14	0	7	28

=== Monmouth ===
	1	2	3	4	Total
Hawks	14	0	7	2	23
Runnin' Bulldogs	0	3	6	0	9
