= 2015 Wagner Seahawks football team =

American college football season

2015 Wagner Seahawks football
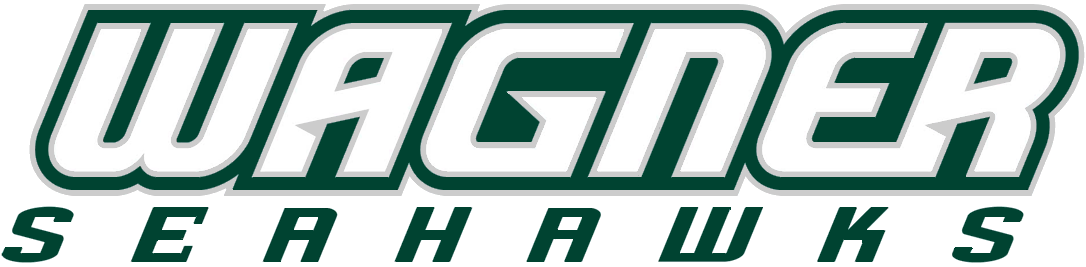
- Conference: Northeast Conference
- Record: 1–10 (1–5 NEC)
- Head coach: Jason Houghtaling (1st season)
- Offensive coordinator: Stefon Wheeler (1st season)
- Defensive coordinator: Patrick Gibbons (1st season)
- Home stadium: Wagner College Stadium

2015 Northeast Conference football standings
	Conf.			Overall
Team	W		L	W		L
Duquesne $^	5	–	1	8	–	4
Saint Francis (PA)	4	–	2	6	–	4
Sacred Heart	3	–	3	6	–	5
Bryant	3	–	3	5	–	6
Central Connecticut	3	–	3	4	–	7
Robert Morris	2	–	4	4	–	7
Wagner	1	–	5	1	–	10
$ – Conference champion; ^ – FCS playoff participant

The 2015 Wagner Seahawks football team represented Wagner College in the 2015 NCAA Division I FCS football season as a member of the Northeast Conference (NEC). They were led by first-year head coach Jason Houghtaling and played their home games at Wagner College Stadium. They finished the season 1–10 overall and 1–5 in NEC play to place seventh.

== Schedule ==
Date	Time	Opponent	Site	TV	Result	Attendance
September 5	3:30 p.m.	at Rice*	Rice Stadium; Houston, TX	ASN	L 16–56	18,296
September 19	6:00 p.m.	Monmouth*	Wagner College Stadium; Staten Island, NY	NECFR	L 16–31	2,812
September 26	6:00 p.m.	Lafayette*^{†}	Wagner College Stadium; Staten Island, NY	ESPN3	L 24–35	2,691
October 3	Noon	Robert Morris	Wagner College Stadium; Staten Island, NY	NECFR	L 6–9	1,311
October 10	6:00 p.m.	at Columbia*	Robert K. Kraft Field at Lawrence A. Wien Stadium; New York City, NY		L 3–26	3,211
October 17	3:30 p.m.	at Saint Francis (PA)	DeGol Field; Loretto, PA	ESPN3	L 14–43	1,106
October 24	3:00 p.m.	at BYU*	LaVell Edwards Stadium; Provo, UT	BYUtv	L 6–70	56,015
October 31	Noon	at Duquesne	Arthur J. Rooney Athletic Field; Pittsburgh, PA	NECFR	L 17–35	782
November 7	Noon	Bryant	Wagner College Stadium; Staten Island, NY	ESPN3	L 10–40	2,313
November 14	Noon	Central Connecticut	Wagner College Stadium; Staten Island, NY	NECFR	W 28–7	2,010
November 21	Noon	at Sacred Heart	Campus Field; Fairfield, CT	NECFR	L 17–45	1,725
*Non-conference game; ^{†}Homecoming; All times are in Eastern time
