= 2015 San Diego Toreros football team =

American college football season

2015 San Diego Toreros football

PFL co-champion
- Conference: Pioneer Football League
- Record: 9–2 (7–1 PFL)
- Head coach: Dale Lindsey (3rd season)
- Offensive coordinator: Tanner Engstrand (5th season)
- Defensive coordinator: Steve Irvin (3rd season)
- Home stadium: Torero Stadium

2015 Pioneer Football League standings
	Conf.			Overall
Team	W		L	W		L
Dayton +^	7	–	1	10	–	2
San Diego +	7	–	1	9	–	2
Jacksonville *	6	–	2	9	–	2
Morehead State	6	–	2	7	–	4
Butler	4	–	4	6	–	5
Drake	4	–	4	5	–	6
Marist	4	–	4	5	–	6
Campbell	3	–	5	5	–	6
Stetson	1	–	7	3	–	8
Valparaiso	1	–	7	2	–	9
Davidson	1	–	7	2	–	9
+ – Conference co-champions; ^ – FCS playoff participant; * Jacksonville ineligible for PFL title and FCS playoffs due to matters regarding the PFL's financial aid rules

The 2015 San Diego Toreros football team represented the University of San Diego as a member of the Pioneer Football League (PFL) during the 2015 NCAA Division I FCS football season. Led by third-year head coach Dale Lindsey, the Toreros compiled an overall record of 9–2 with a mark of 7–1 in conference play, sharing the PFL title with Dayton. Due to their head-to-head win over the Toreros, the Flyers received the PFL's automatic bid to the NCAA Division I Football Championship playoffs. San Diego did not receive an at-large bid. The team played home games at Torero Stadium in San Diego.

== Schedule ==
Date	Time	Opponent	Site	Result	Attendance
September 5	5:00 pm	at San Diego State*	Qualcomm Stadium; San Diego, CA	L 3–37	48,785
September 12	6:00 pm	Western New Mexico*	Torero Stadium; San Diego, CA	W 45–21	2,872
September 26	10:30 am	at Valparaiso	Brown Field; Valparaiso, IN	W 38–6	3,183
October 3	1:00 pm	Marist	Torero Stadium; San Diego, CA	W 30–27	1,445
October 10	10:00 am	at Dayton	Welcome Stadium; Dayton, OH	L 12–13	2,556
October 17	2:00 pm	Drake^{†}	Torero Stadium; San Diego, CA	W 27–0	3,365
October 24	6:00 pm	Warner*	Torero Stadium; San Diego, CA	W 45–14	1,219
October 31	10:00 am	at Stetson	Spec Martin Stadium; DeLand, FL	W 47–16	2,444
November 7	12:00 pm	Campbell	Torero Stadium; San Diego, CA	W 31–27	1,536
November 14	9:00 am	at Davidson	Richardson Stadium; Davidson, NC	W 35–10	3,012
November 21	1:00 pm	Butler	Torero Stadium; San Diego, CA	W 28–27	3,402
*Non-conference game; ^{†}Homecoming; All times are in Pacific time

== Game summaries ==
=== At San Diego State ===
	1	2	3	4	Total
Toreros	0	0	3	0	3
Aztecs	14	6	7	10	37

=== Western New Mexico ===
	1	2	3	4	Total
Mustangs	7	0	7	7	21
Toreros	14	10	0	21	45

=== At Valparaiso ===
	1	2	3	4	Total
Toreros	0	10	14	14	38
Crusaders	3	0	0	3	6

=== Marist ===
	1	2	3	4	Total
Red Foxes	13	7	0	7	27
Toreros	7	6	14	3	30

=== At Dayton ===
	1	2	3	4	Total
Toreros	6	3	0	3	12
Flyers	3	0	10	0	13

=== Drake ===
	1	2	3	4	Total
Drake Bulldogs	0	0	0	0	0
Toreros	7	7	6	7	27

=== Warner ===
	1	2	3	4	Total
Royals	7	7	0	0	14
Toreros	14	21	7	3	45

=== At Stetson ===
	1	2	3	4	Total
Toreros	7	20	0	20	47
Hatters	6	3	0	7	16

=== Campbell ===
	1	2	3	4	Total
Fighting Camels	14	7	6	0	27
Toreros	7	16	8	0	31

=== At Davidson ===
	1	2	3	4	Total
Toreros	7	7	14	7	35
Wildcats	0	3	7	0	10

=== Butler ===
	1	2	3	4	Total
Butler Bulldogs	0	7	14	6	27
Toreros	14	0	14	0	28
