= 2015 Drake Bulldogs football team =

American college football season

2015 Drake Bulldogs football
- Conference: Pioneer Football League
- Record: 5–6 (4–4 PFL)
- Head coach: Rick Fox (2nd season)
- Defensive coordinator: Todd Stepsis (2nd season)
- Home stadium: Drake Stadium

2015 Pioneer Football League standings
	Conf.			Overall
Team	W		L	W		L
Dayton +^	7	–	1	10	–	2
San Diego +	7	–	1	9	–	2
Jacksonville *	6	–	2	9	–	2
Morehead State	6	–	2	7	–	4
Butler	4	–	4	6	–	5
Drake	4	–	4	5	–	6
Marist	4	–	4	5	–	6
Campbell	3	–	5	5	–	6
Stetson	1	–	7	3	–	8
Valparaiso	1	–	7	2	–	9
Davidson	1	–	7	2	–	9
+ – Conference co-champions; ^ – FCS playoff participant; * Jacksonville ineligible for PFL title and FCS playoffs due to matters regarding the PFL's financial aid rules

The 2015 Drake Bulldogs football team represented Drake University as a member of the Pioneer Football League (PFL) during 2015 NCAA Division I FCS football season. Led by second-year head coach Rick Fox, the Bulldogs compiled an overall record of 5–6 with a mark of 4–4 in conference play, placing in a three-way tie for fourth in the PFL. The team played its home games at Drake Stadium in Des Moines, Iowa.

== Schedule ==
Date	Time	Opponent	Site	TV	Result	Attendance
September 5	6:00 pm	William Jewell*	Drake Stadium; Des Moines, IA		W 44–30	3,034
September 12	5:00 pm	at North Dakota*	Alerus Center; Grand Forks, ND	Midco SN	L 18–21	9,865
September 19	2:00 pm	at South Dakota*	DakotaDome; Vermillion, SD	ESPN3	L 0–52	8,045
September 26	1:00 pm	Stetson	Drake Stadium; Des Moines, IA		W 41–3	3,326
October 3	5:00 pm	at Campbell	Barker–Lane Stadium; Buies Creek, NC		L 14–24	4,620
October 10	1:00 pm	Valparaiso^{†}	Drake Stadium; Des Moines, IA		W 38–14	2,336
October 17	3:00 pm	at San Diego	Torero Stadium; San Diego, CA		L 0–27	3,365
October 24	1:00 pm	Jacksonville	Drake Stadium; Des Moines, IA		W 28–24	2,028
October 31	12:00 pm	at Morehead State	Jayne Stadium; Morehead, KY		L 35–38 ^{3OT}	6,657
November 14	12:00 pm	at Butler	Butler Bowl; Indianapolis, IN		L 13–20	2,371
November 21	1:00 pm	Dayton	Drake Stadium; Des Moines, IA (rivalry)		W 27–17	1,330
*Non-conference game; ^{†}Homecoming; All times are in Central time

== Game summaries ==
=== William Jewell ===
	1	2	3	4	Total
Cardinals	3	0	13	14	30
Bulldogs	7	6	16	15	44

=== @ North Dakota ===
	1	2	3	4	Total
Bulldogs	0	0	3	15	18
North Dakota	7	14	0	0	21

=== @ South Dakota ===
	1	2	3	4	Total
Bulldogs	0	0	0	0	0
Coyotes	10	21	7	14	52

=== Stetson ===
	1	2	3	4	Total
Hatters	0	3	0	0	3
Bulldogs	0	17	10	14	41

=== @ Campbell ===
	1	2	3	4	Total
Bulldogs	0	7	7	0	14
Fighting Camels	3	7	7	7	24

=== Valparaiso ===
	1	2	3	4	Total
Crusaders	0	0	0	7	7
Bulldogs	7	7	14	6	34

=== @ San Diego ===
	1	2	3	4	Total
Bulldogs	0	0	0	0	0
Toreros	7	7	6	7	27

=== Jacksonville ===
	1	2	3	4	Total
Dolphins	3	7	14	0	24
Bulldogs	0	14	0	14	28

=== @ Morehead State ===
	1	2	3	4	OT	2OT	3OT	Total
Bulldogs	7	0	7	14	0	7	0	35
Eagles	7	0	14	7	0	7	3	38

=== @ Butler ===
	1	2	3	4	Total
DU Bulldogs	3	7	3	0	13
BU Bulldots	0	3	7	10	20

=== Dayton ===
	1	2	3	4	Total
Flyers	0	0	7	10	17
Bulldogs	7	14	0	6	27
