= 2015 Davidson Wildcats football team =

American college football season

2015 Davidson Wildcats football
- Conference: Pioneer Football League
- Record: 2–9 (1–7 PFL)
- Head coach: Paul Nichols (3rd season)
- Offensive coordinator: Derham Cato
- Defensive coordinator: Chad Creamer
- Home stadium: Richardson Stadium

2015 Pioneer Football League standings
	Conf.			Overall
Team	W		L	W		L
Dayton +^	7	–	1	10	–	2
San Diego +	7	–	1	9	–	2
Jacksonville *	6	–	2	9	–	2
Morehead State	6	–	2	7	–	4
Butler	4	–	4	6	–	5
Drake	4	–	4	5	–	6
Marist	4	–	4	5	–	6
Campbell	3	–	5	5	–	6
Stetson	1	–	7	3	–	8
Valparaiso	1	–	7	2	–	9
Davidson	1	–	7	2	–	9
+ – Conference co-champions; ^ – FCS playoff participant; * Jacksonville ineligible for PFL title and FCS playoffs due to matters regarding the PFL's financial aid rules

The 2015 Davidson Wildcats football team represented Davidson College in the 2015 NCAA Division I FCS football season. They were led by third-year head coach Paul Nichols and played their home games at Richardson Stadium. They were a member of the Pioneer Football League. They finished the season 2–9, 1–7 in PFL play to finish in a three-way tie for eighth place.

== Schedule ==
Date	Time	Opponent	Site	TV	Result	Attendance
September 5	6:00 pm	at The Citadel*	Johnson Hagood Stadium; Charleston, SC	ESPN3	L 0–69	8,665
September 12	7:00 pm	Catawba*	Richardson Stadium; Davidson, NC		L 21–35	4,372
September 26	1:00 pm	at Morehead State	Jayne Stadium; Morehead, KY		L 0–34	7,177
October 3	1:00 pm	Valparaiso^{†}	Richardson Stadium; Davidson, NC		L 35–42	647
October 10	1:00 pm	Kentucky Wesleyan*	Richardson Stadium; Davidson, NC		W 14–7 ^{OT}	487
October 17	1:00 pm	at Butler	Butler Bowl; Indianapolis, IN		L 7–38	2,264
October 24	1:00 pm	Marist	Richardson Stadium; Davidson, NC		L 10–31	4,209
October 31	1:00 pm	Campbell	Richardson Stadium; Davidson, NC		L 9–39	3,821
November 7	1:00 pm	at Jacksonville	D. B. Milne Field; Jacksonville, FL		L 12–42	3,769
November 14	12:00 pm	San Diego	Richardson Stadium; Davidson, NC		L 10–35	3,012
November 21	1:00 pm	at Stetson	Spec Martin Stadium; DeLand, FL		W 20–17	1,757
*Non-conference game; ^{†}Homecoming; All times are in Eastern time

- Source: Schedule

== Game summaries ==
=== At The Citadel ===
	1	2	3	4	Total
Wildcats	0	0	0	0	0
Bulldogs	21	14	20	14	69

=== Catawba ===
	1	2	3	4	Total
Indians	7	18	10	0	35
Wildcats	7	7	0	7	21

=== At Morehead State ===
	1	2	3	4	Total
Wildcats	0	0	0	0	0
Eagles	7	20	7	0	34

=== Valparaiso ===
	1	2	3	4	Total
Crusaders	7	0	21	14	42
Wildcats	7	7	7	14	35

=== Kentucky Wesleyan ===
	1	2	3	4	OT	Total
Panthers	0	0	7	0	0	7
Wildcats	0	7	0	0	7	14

=== At Butler ===
	1	2	3	4	Total
Wildcats	0	0	7	0	7
Bulldogs	14	0	14	10	38

=== Marist ===
	1	2	3	4	Total
Red Foxes	0	10	14	7	31
Wildcats	10	0	0	0	10

=== Campbell ===
	1	2	3	4	Total
Fighting Camels	7	10	7	15	39
Wildcats	0	0	9	0	9

=== At Jacksonville ===
	1	2	3	4	Total
Wildcats	0	6	3	3	12
Dolphins	14	21	7	0	42

=== San Diego ===
	1	2	3	4	Total
Toreros	7	7	14	7	35
Wildcats	0	3	7	0	10

=== At Stetson ===
	1	2	3	4	Total
Wildcats	7	3	0	10	20
Hatters	0	0	3	14	17
