= 2015 Stetson Hatters football team =

American college football season

2015 Stetson Hatters football
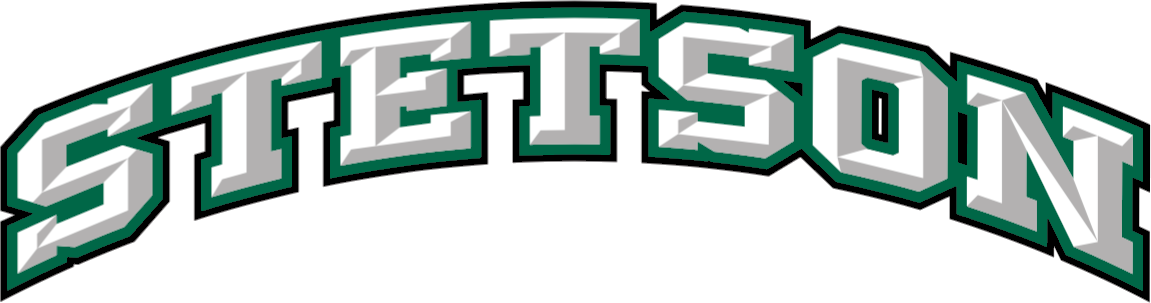
- Conference: Pioneer Football League
- Record: 3–8 (1–7 PFL)
- Head coach: Roger Hughes (3rd season)
- Defensive coordinator: Brian Young (3rd season)
- Home stadium: Spec Martin Stadium

2015 Pioneer Football League standings
	Conf.			Overall
Team	W		L	W		L
Dayton +^	7	–	1	10	–	2
San Diego +	7	–	1	9	–	2
Jacksonville *	6	–	2	9	–	2
Morehead State	6	–	2	7	–	4
Butler	4	–	4	6	–	5
Drake	4	–	4	5	–	6
Marist	4	–	4	5	–	6
Campbell	3	–	5	5	–	6
Stetson	1	–	7	3	–	8
Valparaiso	1	–	7	2	–	9
Davidson	1	–	7	2	–	9
+ – Conference co-champions; ^ – FCS playoff participant; * Jacksonville ineligible for PFL title and FCS playoffs due to matters regarding the PFL's financial aid rules

The 2015 Stetson Hatters football team represented Stetson University as a member of the Pioneer Football League (PFL) during the 2015 NCAA Division I FCS football season. Led by third-year head coach Roger Hughes, the Hatters compiled an overall record of 3–8 with a mark of 1–7 in conference play, placing in a three-way tie for eighth in the PFL. Stetson played home games at Spec Martin Stadium on DeLand, Florida.

== Schedule ==
Date	Time	Opponent	Site	TV	Result	Attendance
September 5	7:00 pm	Webber International*	Spec Martin Stadium; DeLand, FL	ESPN3	W 42–13	3,842
September 12	6:00 pm	at Mercer*	Moye Complex; Macon, GA	ESPN3	L 14–57	11,267
September 26	2:00 pm	at Drake	Drake Stadium; Des Moines, IA		L 3–41	3,326
October 3	1:00 pm	Dayton	Spec Martin Stadium; DeLand, FL	ESPN3	L 14–27	3,164
October 10	6:00 pm	at Jacksonville	D. B. Milne Field; Jacksonville, FL	ESPN3	L 14–41	6,324
October 17	1:00 pm	Campbell	Spec Martin Stadium; DeLand, FL	ESPN3	L 6–16	3,100
October 24	2:00 pm	at Valparaiso	Brown Field; Valparaiso, IN	ESPN3	W 37–14	729
October 31	1:00 pm	San Diego	Spec Martin Stadium; DeLand, FL	ESPN3	L 16–47	2,444
November 7	1:00 pm	at Marist	Tenney Stadium at Leonidoff Field; Poughkeepsie, NY		L 14–49	1,905
November 14	5:00 pm	Ave Maria*^{†}	Spec Martin Stadium; DeLand, FL	ESPN3	W 60–21	3,825
November 21	1:00 pm	Davidson	Spec Martin Stadium; DeLand, FL	ESPN3	L 17–20	1,757
*Non-conference game; ^{†}Homecoming; All times are in Eastern time

== Game summaries ==
=== Webber International ===
	1	2	3	4	Total
Warriors	0	6	0	7	13
Hatters	7	14	7	14	42

=== At Mercer ===
	1	2	3	4	Total
Hatters	7	0	7	0	14
Bears	17	34	0	6	57

=== At Drake ===
	1	2	3	4	Total
Hatters	0	3	0	0	3
Bulldogs	0	17	10	14	41

=== Dayton ===
	1	2	3	4	Total
Flyers	10	7	10	0	27
Hatters	7	0	0	7	14

=== At Jacksonville ===
	1	2	3	4	Total
Hatters	0	7	0	7	14
Dolphins	14	14	7	6	41

=== Campbell ===
	1	2	3	4	Total
Fighting Camels	0	3	13	0	16
Hatters	3	3	0	0	6

=== At Valparaiso ===
	1	2	3	4	Total
Hatters	14	7	6	10	37
Crusaders	0	7	0	7	14

=== San Diego ===
	1	2	3	4	Total
Toreros	7	20	0	20	47
Hatters	6	3	0	7	16

=== At Marist ===
	1	2	3	4	Total
Hatters	7	7	0	0	14
Red Foxes	21	14	7	7	49

=== Ave Maria ===
	1	2	3	4	Total
Gyrenes	0	7	14	0	21
Hatters	13	17	13	17	60

=== Davidson ===
	1	2	3	4	Total
Wildcats	7	3	0	10	20
Hatters	0	0	3	14	17
