= 2015 Jacksonville Dolphins football team =

American college football season

2015 Jacksonville Dolphins football
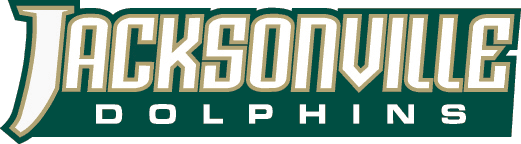
- Conference: Pioneer Football League
- Record: 9–2 (6–2 PFL)
- Head coach: Kerwin Bell (9th season)
- Defensive coordinator: Jerry Odom (6th season)
- Home stadium: D. B. Milne Field

2015 Pioneer Football League standings
	Conf.			Overall
Team	W		L	W		L
Dayton +^	7	–	1	10	–	2
San Diego +	7	–	1	9	–	2
Jacksonville *	6	–	2	9	–	2
Morehead State	6	–	2	7	–	4
Butler	4	–	4	6	–	5
Drake	4	–	4	5	–	6
Marist	4	–	4	5	–	6
Campbell	3	–	5	5	–	6
Stetson	1	–	7	3	–	8
Valparaiso	1	–	7	2	–	9
Davidson	1	–	7	2	–	9
+ – Conference co-champions; ^ – FCS playoff participant; * Jacksonville ineligible for PFL title and FCS playoffs due to matters regarding the PFL's financial aid rules

The 2015 Jacksonville Dolphins football team represented Jacksonville University in the 2015 NCAA Division I FCS football season. They were led by ninth-year head coach Kerwin Bell and played their home games at D. B. Milne Field. They were a member of the Pioneer Football League. They finished the season 9–2, 6–2 in PFL play. However, due to PFL rules violations, their official conference record was 0–0 and did not occupy a place in the conference standings.

On December 3, it was announced that head coach Kerwin Bell's contract would not be renewed. He finished at Jacksonville with a nine year record of 66–35.

== Schedule ==
Date	Time	Opponent	Site	TV	Result	Attendance
September 4	7:00 pm	at Delaware*	Delaware Stadium; Newark, DE	HAA	W 20–14	17,472
September 12	1:00 pm	at Newberry*	Setzler Field; Newberry, SC		W 17–14	3,239
September 26	12:00 pm	at Marist	Tenney Stadium at Leonidoff Field; Poughkeepsie, NY		W 20–16	2,160
October 3	1:00 pm	Morehead State	D. B. Milne Field; Jacksonville, FL	ESPN3	W 30–26	2,844
October 10	6:00 pm	Stetson^{†}	D. B. Milne Field; Jacksonville, FL	ESPN3	W 41–14	6,324
October 17	1:00 pm	Edward Waters*	D. B. Milne Field; Jacksonville, FL (Jacksonville Classic)	ESPN3	W 49–28	2,577
October 24	2:00 pm	at Drake	Drake Stadium; Des Moines, IA		L 24–28	2,028
October 31	1:00 pm	at Dayton	Welcome Stadium; Dayton, OH		L 14–31	2,275
November 7	1:00 pm	Davidson	D. B. Milne Field; Jacksonville, FL	ESPN3	W 42–12	3,769
November 14	1:00 pm	at Campbell	Barker–Lane Stadium; Buies Creek, NC		W 20–14	4,170
November 21	1:00 pm	Valparaiso	D. B. Milne Field; Jacksonville, FL	ESPN3	W 58–13	2,388
*Non-conference game; ^{†}Homecoming; All times are in Eastern time

- Source: Schedule
