= 2015 Butler Bulldogs football team =

American college football season

2015 Butler Bulldogs football
- Conference: Pioneer Football League
- Record: 6–5 (4–4 PFL)
- Head coach: Jeff Voris (10th season)
- Co-defensive coordinators: Joe Cheshire (6th season); Tim Cooper (6th season)
- Home stadium: Butler Bowl

2015 Pioneer Football League standings
	Conf.			Overall
Team	W		L	W		L
Dayton +^	7	–	1	10	–	2
San Diego +	7	–	1	9	–	2
Jacksonville *	6	–	2	9	–	2
Morehead State	6	–	2	7	–	4
Butler	4	–	4	6	–	5
Drake	4	–	4	5	–	6
Marist	4	–	4	5	–	6
Campbell	3	–	5	5	–	6
Stetson	1	–	7	3	–	8
Valparaiso	1	–	7	2	–	9
Davidson	1	–	7	2	–	9
+ – Conference co-champions; ^ – FCS playoff participant; * Jacksonville ineligible for PFL title and FCS playoffs due to matters regarding the PFL's financial aid rules

The 2015 Butler Bulldogs football team represented Butler University as a member of the Pioneer Football League (PFL) during the 2015 NCAA Division I FCS football season. Led by tenth-year head coach Jeff Voris, Bulldogs compiled an overall record of 6–5 with a mark of 4–4 in conference play, placing in a three-way tie for fourth in the PFL. Butler played home games at the Butler Bowl in Indianapolis.

== Schedule ==
Date	Time	Opponent	Site	TV	Result	Attendance
September 5	3:05 pm	at No. 21 Indiana State*	Memorial Stadium; Terre Haute, IN	ESPN3	L 17–52	3,941
September 12	6:30 pm	Franklin (IN)*	Butler Bowl; Indianapolis, IN		W 41–14	4,811
September 19	7:00 pm	at Taylor*	New Stadium; Upland, IN		W 41–10	3,456
September 26	12:00 pm	Campbell^{†}	Butler Bowl; Indianapolis, IN		W 25–24	4,537
October 10	1:00 pm	at Morehead State	Jayne Stadium; Morehead, KY		L 21–34	9,805
October 17	1:00 pm	Davidson	Butler Bowl; Indianapolis, IN		W 38–7	2,264
October 24	6:00 pm	at Dayton	Welcome Stadium; Dayton, OH		L 24–27	3,766
October 31	12:00 pm	at Marist	Tenney Stadium at Leonidoff Field; Poughkeepsie, NY		L 14–35	1,483
November 7	1:00 pm	Valparaiso	Butler Bowl; Indianapolis, IN (Hoosier Helmet Trophy)		W 42–21	5,113
November 14	1:00 pm	Drake	Butler Bowl; Indianapolis, IN		W 20–13	2,371
November 21	4:00 pm	at San Diego	Torero Stadium; San Diego, CA		L 27–28	3,402
*Non-conference game; ^{†}Homecoming; Rankings from STATS Poll released prior to the game; All times are in Eastern time

== Game summaries ==
=== At Indiana State ===
	1	2	3	4	Total
Bulldogs	0	10	7	0	17
#21 Sycamores	24	7	14	7	52

=== Franklin ===
	1	2	3	4	Total
Grizzlies	0	0	7	7	14
Bulldogs	10	21	3	7	41

=== At Taylor ===
	1	2	3	4	Total
Bulldogs	7	20	7	7	41
Trojans	10	0	0	0	10

=== Campbell ===
	1	2	3	4	Total
Fighting Camels	14	0	0	10	24
Bulldogs	10	0	0	15	25

=== At Morehead State ===
	1	2	3	4	Total
Bulldogs	0	14	0	7	21
Eagles	10	14	0	10	34

=== Davidson ===
	1	2	3	4	Total
Wildcats	0	0	7	0	7
Bulldogs	14	0	14	10	38

=== At Dayton ===
	1	2	3	4	Total
Bulldogs	10	7	7	0	24
Flyers	7	7	3	10	27

=== At Marist ===
	1	2	3	4	Total
Bulldogs	0	0	7	7	14
Red Foxes	14	7	0	14	35

=== Valparaiso ===
	1	2	3	4	Total
Crusaders	7	7	0	7	21
Bulldogs	14	7	14	7	42

=== Drake ===
	1	2	3	4	Total
DU Bulldogs	3	7	3	0	13
BU Bulldogs	0	3	7	10	20

=== At San Diego ===
	1	2	3	4	Total
Bulldogs	0	7	14	6	27
Toreros	14	0	14	0	28
