= 2015 Charleston Southern Buccaneers football team =

American college football season

2015 Charleston Southern Buccaneers football

Big South champion

NCAA Division I Quarterfinal, L 38–58 vs. Jacksonville State
- Conference: Big South Conference

Ranking
- STATS: No. 6
- FCS Coaches: No. 7
- Record: 10–3 (6–0 Big South)
- Head coach: Jamey Chadwell (3rd season)
- Offensive coordinator: Gabe Giardina (3rd season)
- Defensive coordinator: Chad Staggs (3rd season)
- Home stadium: Buccaneer Field

2015 Big South Conference football standings
| | Conf. | | | Overall |
| Team | W | | L | W | | L |
|---|---|---|---|---|---|---|
| No. 6 Charleston Southern $^ | 6 | – | 0 | 10 | – | 3 |
| No. 16 Coastal Carolina ^ | 4 | – | 2 | 9 | – | 3 |
| Liberty | 3 | – | 3 | 6 | – | 5 |
| Monmouth | 3 | – | 3 | 5 | – | 6 |
| Kennesaw State | 2 | – | 4 | 6 | – | 5 |
| Gardner–Webb * | 2 | – | 4 | 4 | – | 7 |
| Presbyterian | 1 | – | 5 | 2 | – | 9 |
$ – Conference champion; ^ – FCS playoff participant; * Gardner–Webb ineligible for postseason due to APR violations; Rankings from STATS Poll

The 2015 Charleston Southern Buccaneers football team represented Charleston Southern University as a member of the Big South Conference during the 2015 NCAA Division I FCS football season. Led by third-year head coach Jamey Chadwell, the Buccaneers compiled an overall record of 10–3 with a mark of 6–0 in conference play, winning the Big South title. Charleston Southern earned the conference's automatic bid to the NCAA Division I Football Championship playoffs. After a first-round bye, the Buccaneers defeated The Citadel in the second round before losing to the eventual national runner-up, Jacksonville State, in the quarterfinals. Charleston Southern played home games at Buccaneer Field in Charleston, South Carolina.

== Schedule ==
| Date | Time | Opponent | Rank | Site | TV | Result | Attendance |
|---|---|---|---|---|---|---|---|
| September 3 | 7:00 pm | North Greenville* | | Buccaneer Field; Charleston, SC | BSN | W 41–14 | 4,820 |
| September 12 | 7:00 pm | at Troy* | | Veterans Memorial Stadium; Troy, AL | ESPN3 | L 16–44 | 17,517 |
| September 17 | 7:00 pm | East Tennessee State* | | Buccaneer Field; Charleston, SC | BSN | W 47–7 | 2,331 |
| September 26 | 6:00 pm | at The Citadel* | | Johnson Hagood Stadium; Charleston, SC | ESPN3 | W 33–20 | 11,998 |
| October 10 | 12:00 pm | Monmouth | | Buccaneer Field; Charleston, SC | BSN | W 37–7 | 1,227 |
| October 17 | 2:00 pm | at Presbyterian | | Bailey Memorial Stadium; Clinton, SC | BSN | W 10–7 | 4,624 |
| October 24 | 1:30 pm | at Gardner–Webb | | Ernest W. Spangler Stadium; Boiling Springs, NC | BSN | W 34–0 | 3,159 |
| October 31 | 2:00 pm | No. 2 Coastal Carolina | No. 24 | Buccaneer Field; Charleston, SC | ASN | W 33–25 | 5,311 |
| November 7 | 1:00 pm | at Kennesaw State | No. 15 | Fifth Third Bank Stadium; Kennesaw, GA | BSN | W 28–14 | 8,670 |
| November 14 | 2:00 pm | Liberty^{†} | No. 11 | Buccaneer Field; Charleston, SC | ESPN3 | W 31–24 | 4,781 |
| November 21 | 4:00 pm | at No. 3 (FBS) Alabama* | No. 9 | Bryant–Denny Stadium; Tuscaloosa, AL | SECN | L 6–56 | 100,611 |
| December 5 | 2:00 pm | No. 18 The Citadel* | No. 9 | Buccaneer Field; Charleston, SC (NCAA Division I Second Round) | ESPN3 | W 14–6 | 8,451 |
| December 11 | 8:00 pm | at No. 1 Jacksonville State* | No. 9 | JSU Stadium; Jacksonville, AL (NCAA Division I Quarterfinal) | ESPN2 | L 38–58 | 22,279 |
*Non-conference game; ^{†}Homecoming; Rankings from STATS Poll released prior to the game; All times are in Eastern time

== Game summaries ==
=== North Greenville ===
| | 1 | 2 | 3 | 4 | Total |
|---|---|---|---|---|---|
| Crusaders | 0 | 7 | 7 | 0 | 14 |
| Buccaneers | 13 | 7 | 14 | 7 | 41 |

=== At Troy ===
| | 1 | 2 | 3 | 4 | Total |
|---|---|---|---|---|---|
| Buccaneers | 7 | 2 | 0 | 7 | 16 |
| Trojans | 14 | 7 | 6 | 17 | 44 |

=== East Tennessee State ===
| | 1 | 2 | 3 | 4 | Total |
|---|---|---|---|---|---|
| ETSU Bucs | 0 | 0 | 0 | 7 | 7 |
| CSU Bucs | 0 | 34 | 6 | 7 | 47 |

=== At The Citadel ===
| | 1 | 2 | 3 | 4 | Total |
|---|---|---|---|---|---|
| Buccaneers | 0 | 6 | 10 | 17 | 33 |
| Bulldogs | 7 | 10 | 3 | 0 | 20 |

=== Monmouth ===
| | 1 | 2 | 3 | 4 | Total |
|---|---|---|---|---|---|
| Hawks | 0 | 0 | 0 | 7 | 7 |
| Buccaneers | 7 | 9 | 14 | 7 | 37 |

=== At Presbyterian ===
| | 1 | 2 | 3 | 4 | Total |
|---|---|---|---|---|---|
| Buccaneers | 3 | 0 | 0 | 7 | 10 |
| Blue Hose | 0 | 7 | 0 | 0 | 7 |

=== At Gardner–Webb ===
| | 1 | 2 | 3 | 4 | Total |
|---|---|---|---|---|---|
| Buccaneers | 7 | 14 | 13 | 0 | 34 |
| Runnin' Bulldogs | 0 | 0 | 0 | 0 | 0 |

=== Coastal Carolina ===
| | 1 | 2 | 3 | 4 | Total |
|---|---|---|---|---|---|
| #2 Chanticleers | 15 | 0 | 3 | 7 | 25 |
| #24 Buccaneers | 13 | 14 | 3 | 3 | 33 |

=== At Kennesaw State ===
| | 1 | 2 | 3 | 4 | Total |
|---|---|---|---|---|---|
| #15 Buccaneers | 7 | 14 | 7 | 0 | 28 |
| Owls | 6 | 0 | 0 | 8 | 14 |

=== Liberty ===
| | 1 | 2 | 3 | 4 | Total |
|---|---|---|---|---|---|
| Flames | 7 | 7 | 7 | 3 | 24 |
| #11 Buccaneers | 7 | 3 | 14 | 7 | 31 |

=== At Alabama ===
| | 1 | 2 | 3 | 4 | Total |
|---|---|---|---|---|---|
| #9 Buccaneers | 0 | 0 | 0 | 6 | 6 |
| #3 (FBS) Crimson Tide | 28 | 21 | 0 | 7 | 56 |

== FCS Playoffs ==
=== Second round – The Citadel ===
| | 1 | 2 | 3 | 4 | Total |
|---|---|---|---|---|---|
| #18 Bulldogs | 3 | 0 | 0 | 3 | 6 |
| #9 Buccaneers | 0 | 14 | 0 | 0 | 14 |

=== Quarterfinals – Jacksonville State ===
| | 1 | 2 | 3 | 4 | Total |
|---|---|---|---|---|---|
| #9 Buccaneers | 3 | 7 | 7 | 21 | 38 |
| #1 Gamecocks | 10 | 3 | 21 | 24 | 58 |

== Ranking movements ==
Ranking movements Legend: ██ Increase in ranking ██ Decrease in ranking RV = Received votes
| | Week | | | | | | | | | | | | | |
| Poll | Pre | 1 | 2 | 3 | 4 | 5 | 6 | 7 | 8 | 9 | 10 | 11 | 12 | Final |
|---|---|---|---|---|---|---|---|---|---|---|---|---|---|---|
| STATS FCS | RV | RV | RV | RV | RV | RV | RV | RV | 24 | 15 | 11 | 9 | 9 | 6 |
| Coaches | RV | RV | RV | RV | RV | RV | 23 | 20 | 19 | 13 | 8 | 8 | 7 | 7 |
