= 2015 Duquesne Dukes football team =

American college football season

2015 Duquesne Dukes football

Northeast Conference champion

FCS Playoffs First Round, L 49–52 vs. William & Mary
- Conference: Northeast Conference
- Record: 8–4 (5–1 NEC)
- Head coach: Jerry Schmitt (11th season)
- Offensive coordinator: Gary Dunn
- Defensive coordinator: Dave Opfar
- Home stadium: Arthur J. Rooney Athletic Field

2015 Northeast Conference football standings
	Conf.			Overall
Team	W		L	W		L
Duquesne $^	5	–	1	8	–	4
Saint Francis (PA)	4	–	2	6	–	4
Sacred Heart	3	–	3	6	–	5
Bryant	3	–	3	5	–	6
Central Connecticut	3	–	3	4	–	7
Robert Morris	2	–	4	4	–	7
Wagner	1	–	5	1	–	10
$ – Conference champion; ^ – FCS playoff participant

The 2015 Duquesne Dukes football team represented Duquesne University in the 2015 NCAA Division I FCS football season. They were led by 11th-year head coach Jerry Schmitt and played their home games at Arthur J. Rooney Athletic Field. They were a member of the Northeast Conference. They finished the season 8–4, 5–1 in NEC play to win the NEC championship. They received the NEC's automatic bid to the FCS playoffs where they lost in the first round to William & Mary.

== Schedule ==
Date	Time	Opponent	Site	TV	Result	Attendance
September 5	12:00 pm	Kentucky Christian*	Arthur J. Rooney Athletic Field; Pittsburgh, PA		W 47–7	1,332
September 12	6:00 pm	at Bucknell*	Christy Mathewson–Memorial Stadium; Lewisburg, PA		W 26–7	2,123
September 19	1:00 pm	at Dayton*	Welcome Stadium; Dayton, OH		L 13–24	4,119
September 26	3:30 pm	at Albany*	Bob Ford Field at Tom & Mary Casey Stadium; Albany, NY	DZ	L 14–17	6,227
October 3	12:00 pm	Central Connecticut	Arthur J. Rooney Athletic Field; Pittsburgh, PA		W 27–10	953
October 10	1:00 pm	Alderson Broaddus*^{†}	Arthur J. Rooney Athletic Field; Pittsburgh, PA		W 53–18	2,072
October 17	12:00 pm	at Bryant	Bulldog Stadium; Smithfield, RI	ESPN3	L 17–38	8,364
October 24	6:00 pm	at Robert Morris	Joe Walton Stadium; Moon Township, PA		W 16–7	2,248
October 31	12:00 pm	Wagner	Arthur J. Rooney Athletic Field; Pittsburgh, PA		W 35–17	782
November 7	12:00 pm	at Sacred Heart	Campus Field; Fairfield, CT		W 41–14	1,560
November 21	12:00 pm	Saint Francis (PA)	Arthur J. Rooney Athletic Field; Pittsburgh, PA	ESPN3	W 30–20	1,721
November 28	3:30 pm	at No. 13 William & Mary*	Zable Stadium; Williamsburg, VA (FCS Playoffs First Round)	ESPN3	L 49–52	4,395
*Non-conference game; ^{†}Homecoming; Rankings from STATS FCS Poll released prior to game Poll released prior to the game; All times are in Eastern time

- Source: Schedule
