= 2015 Sacred Heart Pioneers football team =

American college football season

2015 Sacred Heart Pioneers football
- Conference: Northeast Conference
- Record: 6–5 (3–3 NEC)
- Head coach: Mark Nofri (4th season)
- Offensive coordinator: Kevin Bolis (5th season)
- Defensive coordinator: Dave Wissman (5th season)
- Home stadium: Campus Field

2015 Northeast Conference football standings
	Conf.			Overall
Team	W		L	W		L
Duquesne $^	5	–	1	8	–	4
Saint Francis (PA)	4	–	2	6	–	4
Sacred Heart	3	–	3	6	–	5
Bryant	3	–	3	5	–	6
Central Connecticut	3	–	3	4	–	7
Robert Morris	2	–	4	4	–	7
Wagner	1	–	5	1	–	10
$ – Conference champion; ^ – FCS playoff participant

The 2015 Sacred Heart Pioneers football team represented Sacred Heart University as a member of the Northeast Conference (NEC) during the 2015 NCAA Division I FCS football season. Led by fourth-year head coach Mark Nofri, the Pioneers compiled an overall record of 6–5 with a mark of 3–3 in conference play, placing in a three-way tie for third place in the NEC. Sacred Heart played home games at Campus Field in Fairfield, Connecticut.

== Schedule ==
Date	Time	Opponent	Site	TV	Result	Attendance
September 5	6:00 p.m.	Saint Anselm*	Campus Field; Fairfield, CT	NECFR	W 43–19	4,114
September 12	2:00 p.m.	at Valparaiso*	Brown Field; Valparaiso, IN		W 56–3	3,019
September 19	6:00 p.m.	at Marist*	Tenney Stadium at Leonidoff Field; Poughkeepsie, NY		L 27–34	3,629
September 26	7:00 p.m.	at Dartmouth*	Memorial Field; Hanover, NH		L 7–49	7,363
October 10	12:00 p.m.	at Robert Morris	Joe Walton Stadium; Moon Township, PA	ESPN3	W 26–13	1,142
October 17	1:00 p.m.	Cornell*	Campus Field; Fairfield, CT	NECFR	W 31–6	4,551
October 24	1:00 p.m.	Central Connecticut	Campus Field; Fairfield, CT	ESPN3	L 10–26	5,080
October 31	12:00 p.m.	at Saint Francis (PA)	DeGol Field; Loretto, PA	NECFR	L 14–23	1,837
November 7	12:00 p.m.	Duquesne	Campus Field; Fairfield, CT	NECFR	L 14–41	1,560
November 14	12:00 p.m.	at Bryant	Bulldog Stadium; Smithfield, RI	NECFR	W 28–19	3,426
November 21	12:00 p.m.	Wagner	Campus Field; Fairfield, CT	NECFR	W 45–17	1,725
*Non-conference game; All times are in Eastern time
