= 2015 Bryant Bulldogs football team =

American college football season

2015 Bryant Bulldogs football
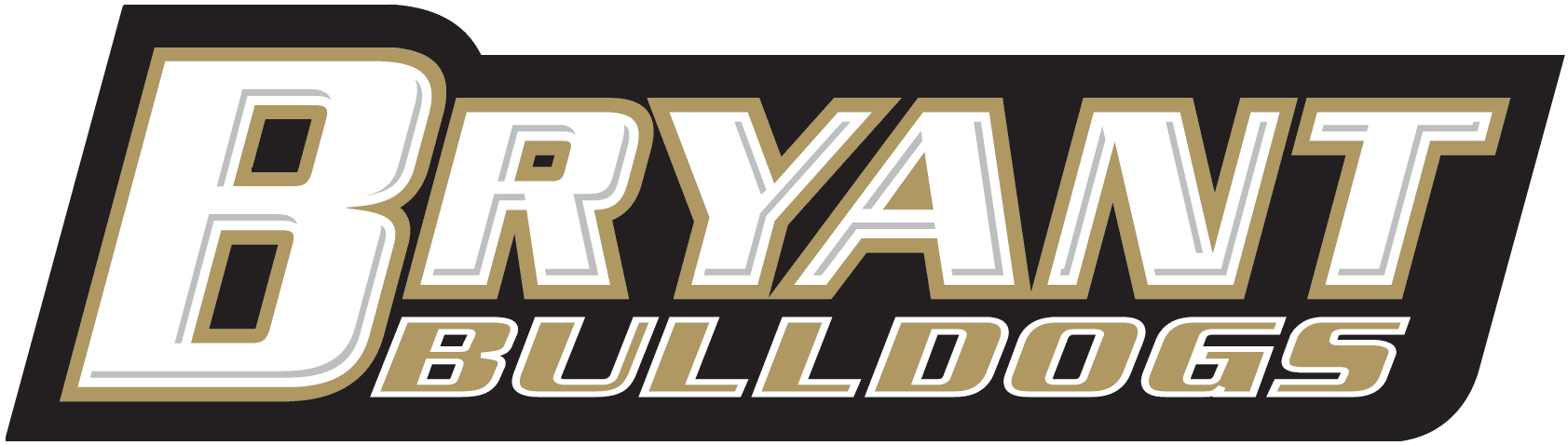
- Conference: Northeast Conference
- Record: 5–6 (3–3 NEC)
- Head coach: Marty Fine (12th season)
- Defensive coordinator: Greg Gigantino (9th season)
- Home stadium: Bulldog Stadium

2015 Northeast Conference football standings
	Conf.			Overall
Team	W		L	W		L
Duquesne $^	5	–	1	8	–	4
Saint Francis (PA)	4	–	2	6	–	4
Sacred Heart	3	–	3	6	–	5
Bryant	3	–	3	5	–	6
Central Connecticut	3	–	3	4	–	7
Robert Morris	2	–	4	4	–	7
Wagner	1	–	5	1	–	10
$ – Conference champion; ^ – FCS playoff participant

The 2015 Bryant Bulldogs football team represented Bryant University as a member of the Northeast Conference (NEC) during the 2015 NCAA Division I FCS football season. Led by 12th-year head coach Marty Fine, the Bulldogs compiled an overall record of 5–6 with a mark of 3–3 in conference play, placing in a three-way tie for third in the NEC. Bryant played home games at Bulldog Stadium in Smithfield, Rhode Island.

== Schedule ==
Date	Time	Opponent	Site	TV	Result	Attendance
September 5	3:00 p.m.	American International*	Bulldog Stadium; Smithfield, RI	NECFR	W 27–3	4,272
September 19	12:30 p.m.	at Brown*	Brown Stadium; Providence, RI		W 20–16	3,261
September 26	6:00 p.m.	at No. 2 Coastal Carolina*	Brooks Stadium; Conway, SC	BSN	L 17–31	10,311
October 3	1:00 p.m.	at Monmouth*	Kessler Field; West Long Branch, NJ	ESPN3	L 24–31	1,086
October 10	1:00 p.m.	at Central Connecticut	Arute Field; New Britain, CT	NECFR	L 33–35	4,379
October 17	12:00 p.m.	Duquesne^{†}	Bulldog Stadium; Smithfield, RI	ESPN3	W 38–17	8,364
October 24	1:00 p.m.	Saint Francis (PA)	Bulldog Stadium; Smithfield, RI	NECFR	W 26–24	5,908
October 31	1:05 p.m.	at Holy Cross*	Fitton Field; Worcester, MA		L 33–34	4,748
November 7	12:00 p.m.	at Wagner	Wagner College Stadium; Staten Island, NY	ESPN3	W 40–10	2,313
November 14	12:00 p.m.	Sacred Heart	Bulldog Stadium; Smithfield, RI	NECFR	L 19–28	3,426
November 21	12:00 p.m.	at Robert Morris	Joe Walton Stadium; Moon Township, PA		L 20–21	1,210
*Non-conference game; ^{†}Homecoming; Rankings from STATS Poll released prior to the game; All times are in Eastern time

== Game summaries ==
=== American International ===
	1	2	3	4	Total
Yellow Jackets	0	0	3	0	3
Bulldogs	0	7	14	6	27

=== Brown ===
	1	2	3	4	Total
Bulldogs	0	10	7	3	20
Bears	10	0	3	3	16

=== Coastal Carolina ===
	1	2	3	4	Total
Bulldogs	10	7	0	0	17
#2 Chanticleers	7	10	7	7	31

=== Monmouth ===
	1	2	3	4	Total
Bulldogs	0	14	2	8	24
Hawks	14	0	3	14	31

=== Central Connecticut ===
	1	2	3	4	Total
Bulldogs	3	10	7	13	33
Blue Devils	0	7	14	14	35

=== Duquesne ===
	1	2	3	4	Total
Dukes	0	7	0	10	17
Bulldogs	10	7	7	14	38

=== Saint Francis (PA) ===
	1	2	3	4	Total
Red Flash	3	0	7	14	24
Bulldogs	14	5	7	0	26

=== Holy Cross ===
	1	2	3	4	Total
Bulldogs	6	14	13	0	33
Crusaders	14	10	0	10	34

=== Wagner ===
	1	2	3	4	Total
Bulldogs	20	0	13	7	40
Seahawks	0	0	7	3	10

=== Sacred Heart ===
	1	2	3	4	Total
Pioneers	0	14	7	7	28
Bulldogs	10	0	0	9	19

=== Robert Morris ===
	1	2	3	4	Total
Bulldogs	7	0	0	13	20
Colonials	14	0	7	0	21
