= 2015 Marist Red Foxes football team =

American college football season

2015 Marist Red Foxes football
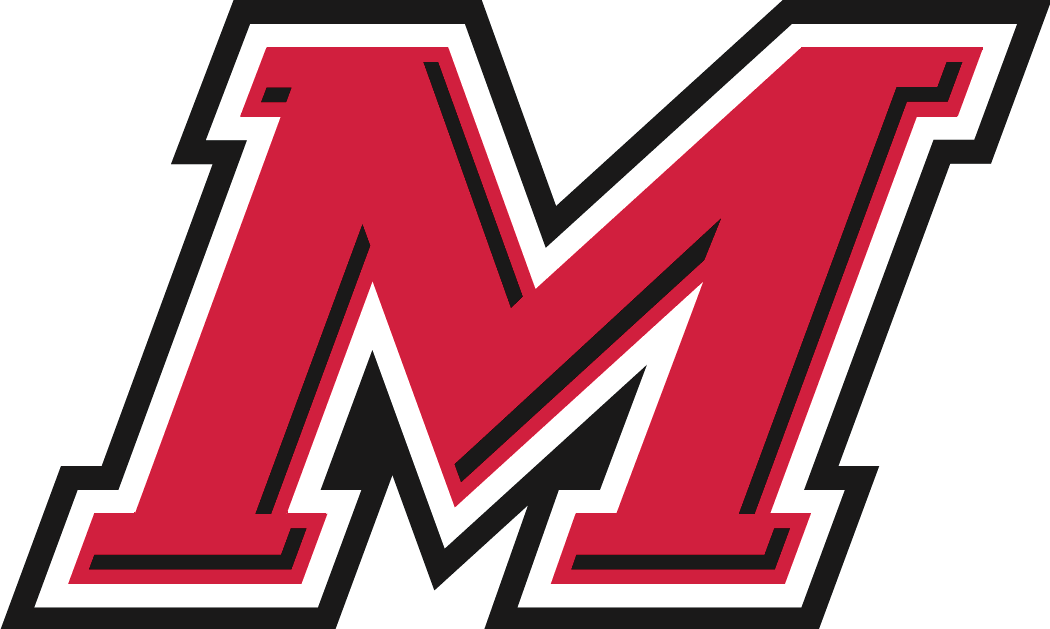
- Conference: Pioneer Football League
- Record: 5–6 (4–4 PFL)
- Head coach: Jim Parady (24th season)
- Offensive coordinator: Nate Fields (3rd season)
- Defensive coordinator: Scott Rumsey (15th season)
- Home stadium: Tenney Stadium at Leonidoff Field

2015 Pioneer Football League standings
	Conf.			Overall
Team	W		L	W		L
Dayton +^	7	–	1	10	–	2
San Diego +	7	–	1	9	–	2
Jacksonville *	6	–	2	9	–	2
Morehead State	6	–	2	7	–	4
Butler	4	–	4	6	–	5
Drake	4	–	4	5	–	6
Marist	4	–	4	5	–	6
Campbell	3	–	5	5	–	6
Stetson	1	–	7	3	–	8
Valparaiso	1	–	7	2	–	9
Davidson	1	–	7	2	–	9
+ – Conference co-champions; ^ – FCS playoff participant; * Jacksonville ineligible for PFL title and FCS playoffs due to matters regarding the PFL's financial aid rules

The 2015 Marist Red Foxes football team represented Marist College as a member of the Pioneer Football League (PFL) during the 2015 NCAA Division I FCS football season. Led by 24th-year head coach Jim Parady, the Red Foxes compiled an overall record of 5–6 with a mark of 4–4 in conference play, placing in a three-way tie for fourth in the PFL. Marist played home games at Tenney Stadium at Leonidoff Field in Poughkeepsie, New York.

== Schedule ==
Date	Time	Opponent	Site	Result	Attendance
September 5	6:00 pm	at Bucknell*	Christy Mathewson–Memorial Stadium; Lewisburg, PA	L 0–17	4,519
September 12	6:00 pm	at Georgetown*	Multi-Sport Field; Washington, DC	L 7–34	1,087
September 19	6:00 pm	Sacred Heart*	Tenney Stadium at Leonidoff Field; Poughkeepsie, NY	W 34–27	3,629
September 26	12:00 pm	Jacksonville^{†}	Tenney Stadium at Leonidoff Field; Poughkeepsie, NY	L 16–20	2,160
October 3	4:00 pm	at San Diego	Torero Stadium; San Diego, CA	L 27–30	1,445
October 10	6:00 pm	at Campbell	Barker–Lane Stadium; Buies Creek, NC	W 13–10	3,460
October 24	1:00 pm	at Davidson	Richardson Stadium; Davidson, NC	W 31–10	4,209
October 31	12:00 pm	Butler	Tenney Stadium at Leonidoff Field; Poughkeepsie, NY	W 35–14	1,483
November 7	1:00 pm	Stetson	Tenney Stadium at Leonidoff Field; Poughkeepsie, NY	W 49–14	1,905
November 14	1:00 pm	at Dayton	Welcome Stadium; Dayton, OH	L 21–28	3,118
November 21	1:00 pm	Morehead State	Tenney Stadium at Leonidoff Field; Poughkeepsie, NY	L 17–20	1,526
*Non-conference game; ^{†}Homecoming; All times are in Eastern time
