= 2015 Robert Morris Colonials football team =

American college football season

2015 Robert Morris Colonials football
- Conference: Northeast Conference
- Record: 4–7 (2–4 NEC)
- Head coach: John Banaszak (2nd season)
- Offensive coordinator: Darrin Hicks (2nd season)
- Defensive coordinator: Scott Farison (8th season)
- Home stadium: Joe Walton Stadium

2015 Northeast Conference football standings
	Conf.			Overall
Team	W		L	W		L
Duquesne $^	5	–	1	8	–	4
Saint Francis (PA)	4	–	2	6	–	4
Sacred Heart	3	–	3	6	–	5
Bryant	3	–	3	5	–	6
Central Connecticut	3	–	3	4	–	7
Robert Morris	2	–	4	4	–	7
Wagner	1	–	5	1	–	10
$ – Conference champion; ^ – FCS playoff participant

The 2015 Robert Morris Colonials football team represented Robert Morris University during the 2015 NCAA Division I FCS football season. They were led by second-year head coach John Banaszak and played their home games at Joe Walton Stadium. They were a member of the Northeast Conference. They finished with a record of 4–7, 2–4 in NEC play, to finish in sixth place.

== Schedule ==
Date	Time	Opponent	Site	TV	Result	Attendance
September 5	12:00 p.m.	Dayton*	Joe Walton Stadium; Moon Township, PA	NECFR	L 24–27	1,329
September 12	7:00 p.m.	at No. 17 Youngstown State*	Stambaugh Stadium; Youngstown, OH	ESPN3	L 14–21 ^{OT}	16,622
September 19	3:00 p.m.	Notre Dame (OH)*^{†}	Joe Walton Stadium; Moon Township, PA	NECFR	W 35–24	2,164
September 26	6:00 p.m.	at No. 6 South Dakota State*	Coughlin–Alumni Stadium; Brookings, SD	ESPN3	L 10–34	12,153
October 3	12:00 p.m.	at Wagner	Wagner College Stadium; Staten Island, NY	NECFR	W 9–6	1,311
October 10	12:00 p.m.	Sacred Heart	Joe Walton Stadium; Moon Township, PA	ESPN3	L 13–26	1,142
October 24	6:00 p.m.	Duquesne	Joe Walton Stadium; Moon Township, PA		L 7–16	2,248
October 31	12:00 p.m.	at Central Connecticut	Arute Field; New Britain, CT	ESPN3	L 0–34	2,117
November 7	12:00 p.m.	East Tennessee State*	Joe Walton Stadium; Moon Township, PA		W 21–9	1,174
November 14	12:00 p.m.	at Saint Francis (PA)	DeGol Field; Loretto, PA		L 0–21	1,547
November 21	12:00 p.m.	Bryant	Joe Walton Stadium; Moon Township, PA		W 21–20	1,210
*Non-conference game; ^{†}Homecoming; Rankings from STATS Poll released prior to the game; All times are in Eastern time

== Game summaries ==
=== Dayton ===
	1	2	3	4	Total
Flyers	0	0	17	10	27
Colonials	0	10	0	14	24

=== Youngstown State ===
	1	2	3	4	OT	Total
Colonials	7	0	0	7	0	14
#17 Penguins	0	0	7	7	7	21

=== Notre Dame (OH) ===
	1	2	3	4	Total
Falcons	0	24	0	0	24
Colonials	14	7	0	14	35

=== South Dakota State ===
	1	2	3	4	Total
Colonials	0	10	0	0	10
#6 Jackrabbits	7	13	7	7	34

=== Wagner ===
	1	2	3	4	Total
Colonials	0	3	3	3	9
Seahawks	3	3	0	0	6

=== Sacred Heart ===
	1	2	3	4	Total
Pioneers	7	13	3	3	26
Colonials	0	6	7	0	13

=== Duquesne ===
	1	2	3	4	Total
Dukes	0	6	3	7	16
Colonials	0	7	0	0	7

=== Central Connecticut ===
	1	2	3	4	Total
Colonials	0	0	0	0	0
Blue Devils	0	0	13	21	34

=== East Tennessee State ===
	1	2	3	4	Total
Buccaneers	0	6	3	0	9
Colonials	0	7	0	14	21

=== Saint Francis (PA) ===
	1	2	3	4	Total
Colonials	0	0	0	0	0
Red Flash	14	0	0	7	21

=== Bryant ===
	1	2	3	4	Total
Bulldogs	7	0	0	13	20
Colonials	14	0	7	0	21
