= 2015 Central Connecticut Blue Devils football team =

American college football season

2015 Central Connecticut Blue Devils football
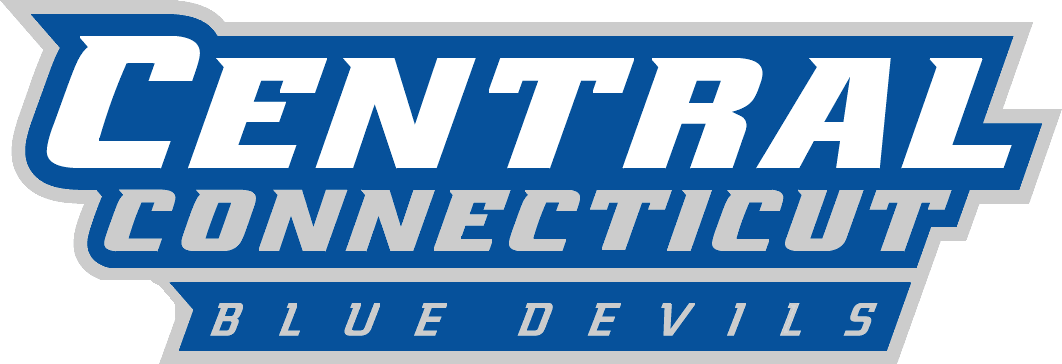
- Conference: Northeast Conference
- Record: 4–7 (3–3 NEC)
- Head coach: Pete Rossomando (2nd season)
- Offensive coordinator: Ryan McCarthy
- Defensive coordinator: Andrew Christ
- Home stadium: Arute Field

2015 Northeast Conference football standings
	Conf.			Overall
Team	W		L	W		L
Duquesne $^	5	–	1	8	–	4
Saint Francis (PA)	4	–	2	6	–	4
Sacred Heart	3	–	3	6	–	5
Bryant	3	–	3	5	–	6
Central Connecticut	3	–	3	4	–	7
Robert Morris	2	–	4	4	–	7
Wagner	1	–	5	1	–	10
$ – Conference champion; ^ – FCS playoff participant

The 2015 Central Connecticut Blue Devils football team represented Central Connecticut State University in the 2015 NCAA Division I FCS football season. They were led by second year head coach Pete Rossomando and played their home games at Arute Field. They were a member of the Northeast Conference. They finished the season 4–7, 3–3 in NEC play to finish in a three-way tie for third place.

== Schedule ==
Date	Time	Opponent	Site	TV	Result	Attendance
September 4	7:00 p.m.	Lehigh*	Arute Field; New Britain, CT	NECFR	L 14–20	5,077
September 12	6:00 p.m.	at Stony Brook*	Kenneth P. LaValle Stadium; Stony Brook, NY		L 9–38	6,513
September 19	7:00 p.m.	Bowie State*	Arute Field; New Britain, CT	NECFR	W 21–14	3,814
September 26	6:00 p.m.	at No. 21 New Hampshire*	Cowell Stadium; Durham, NH		L 14–57	6,215
October 3	12:00 p.m.	at Duquesne	Arthur J. Rooney Athletic Field; Pittsburgh, PA	NECFR	L 10–27	953
October 10	1:00 p.m.	Bryant^{†}	Arute Field; New Britain, CT	NECFR	W 35–33	4,379
October 17	12:00 p.m.	Dartmouth*	Arute Field; New Britain, CT	NECFR	L 7–34	2,064
October 24	1:00 p.m.	at Sacred Heart	Campus Field; Fairfield, CT	ESPN3	W 26–10	5,080
October 31	12:00 p.m.	Robert Morris	Arute Field; New Britain, CT	ESPN3	W 34–0	2,117
November 7	12:00 p.m.	Saint Francis (PA)	Arute Field; New Britain, CT	NECFR	L 13–22	3,113
November 14	12:00 p.m.	at Wagner	Wagner College Stadium; Staten Island, NY	NECFR	L 7–28	2,010
*Non-conference game; ^{†}Homecoming; Rankings from STATS Poll released prior to the game; All times are in Eastern time
