= 2015 Liberty Flames football team =

American college football season

2015 Liberty Flames football
- Conference: Big South Conference
- Record: 6–5 (3–3 Big South)
- Head coach: Turner Gill (4th season)
- Offensive coordinator: Aaron Stamn (4th season)
- Offensive scheme: Spread
- Co-defensive coordinators: Robert Wimberly (4th season); Vantz Singletary (4th season)
- Base defense: 4–3
- Home stadium: Williams Stadium

2015 Big South Conference football standings
| | Conf. | | | Overall |
| Team | W | | L | W | | L |
|---|---|---|---|---|---|---|
| No. 6 Charleston Southern $^ | 6 | – | 0 | 10 | – | 3 |
| No. 16 Coastal Carolina ^ | 4 | – | 2 | 9 | – | 3 |
| Liberty | 3 | – | 3 | 6 | – | 5 |
| Monmouth | 3 | – | 3 | 5 | – | 6 |
| Kennesaw State | 2 | – | 4 | 6 | – | 5 |
| Gardner–Webb * | 2 | – | 4 | 4 | – | 7 |
| Presbyterian | 1 | – | 5 | 2 | – | 9 |
$ – Conference champion; ^ – FCS playoff participant; * Gardner–Webb ineligible for postseason due to APR violations; Rankings from STATS Poll

The 2015 Liberty Flames football team represented Liberty University in the 2015 NCAA Division I FCS football season. Led by fourth-year head coach Turner Gill, they finished the season 6–5. In the Big South Conference, they finished 3–3 and tied for third place. They played their home games at Williams Stadium.

== Schedule ==
| Date | Time | Opponent | Rank | Site | TV | Result | Attendance |
|---|---|---|---|---|---|---|---|
| September 5 | 7:00 pm | Delaware State* | No. 15 | Williams Stadium; Lynchburg, VA | LFSN | W 32–13 | 18,803 |
| September 12 | 3:00 pm | at West Virginia* | No. 15 | Mountaineer Field; Morgantown, WV | RT PITT | L 17–41 | 52,899 |
| September 19 | 7:00 pm | No. 8 Montana* | No. 15 | Williams Stadium; Lynchburg, VA | ESPN3 | W 31–21 | 22,551 |
| September 26 | 7:00 pm | at Southern Illinois* | No. 10 | Saluki Stadium; Carbondale, IL | ESPN3 | L 13–34 | 11,886 |
| October 3 | 3:30 pm | at Georgia State* | No. 18 | Georgia Dome; Atlanta, GA | ESPN3 | W 41–33 | 11,512 |
| October 10 | 7:00 pm | at Gardner–Webb | No. 15 | Ernest W. Spangler Stadium; Boiling Springs, NC | ASN | L 20–34 | 3,545 |
| October 17 | 1:00 pm | at Monmouth | No. 22 | Kessler Field; West Long Beach, NJ | ESPN3 | L 17–20 ^{OT} | 1,734 |
| October 24 | 7:00 pm | Kennesaw State^{†} | | Williams Stadium; Lynchburg, VA | LFSN | W 45–35 | 20,393 |
| November 7 | 3:30 pm | Presbyterian | | Williams Stadium; Lynchburg, VA | ESPN3 | W 21–13 | 14,248 |
| November 14 | 2:00 pm | at No. 11 Charleston Southern | | Buccaneer Field; Charleston, SC | ESPN3 | L 24–31 | 4,718 |
| November 19 | 7:00 pm | No. 4 Coastal Carolina | | Williams Stadium; Lynchburg, VA (rivalry) | ESPNews | W 24–21 | 18,955 |
*Non-conference game; ^{†}Homecoming; Rankings from STATS Poll released prior to the game; All times are in Eastern time

- Source: Schedule

== Game summaries ==
=== Delaware State ===
Delaware State @ Liberty

| Team | 1 | 2 | 3 | 4 | Total |
|---|---|---|---|---|---|
| Hornets | 0 | 6 | 7 | 0 | 13 |
| • #15 Flames | 14 | 5 | 6 | 7 | 32 |

- Date: September 5
- Location: Williams Stadium
  Lynchburg, VA
- Game start: 7:00 PM EDT
- Game attendance: 18,803

=== @ West Virginia ===
Liberty @ West Virginia

| Team | 1 | 2 | 3 | 4 | Total |
|---|---|---|---|---|---|
| #15 Flames | 0 | 0 | 7 | 10 | 17 |
| • Mountaineers | 6 | 14 | 14 | 7 | 41 |

- Date: September 12
- Location: Mountaineer Field
  Morgantown, WV
- Game start: 3:00 PM EDT
- Game attendance: 52,899

=== Montana ===
Montana @ Liberty

| Team | 1 | 2 | 3 | 4 | Total |
|---|---|---|---|---|---|
| #8 Grizzlies | 0 | 12 | 7 | 2 | 21 |
| • #15 Flames | 14 | 3 | 7 | 7 | 31 |

- Date: September 19
- Location: Williams Stadium
  Lynchburg, VA
- Game start: 7:00 PM EDT
- Game attendance: 22,551

=== @ Southern Illinois ===
Liberty @ Southern Illinois

| Team | 1 | 2 | 3 | 4 | Total |
|---|---|---|---|---|---|
| #10 Flames | 3 | 3 | 0 | 7 | 13 |
| • Salukis | 3 | 17 | 7 | 7 | 34 |

- Date: September 26
- Location: Saluki Stadium
  Carbondale, IL
- Game start: 7:00 PM EDT
- Game attendance: 11,886

=== @ Georgia State ===
Liberty @ Georgia State

| Team | 1 | 2 | 3 | 4 | Total |
|---|---|---|---|---|---|
| • #18 Flames | 7 | 14 | 7 | 13 | 41 |
| Panthers | 14 | 0 | 10 | 9 | 33 |

- Date: October 3
- Location: Georgia Dome
  Atlanta, GA
- Game start: 3:30 PM EDT
- Game attendance: 11,512

=== @ Gardner–Webb ===
Liberty @ Gardner–Webb

| Team | 1 | 2 | 3 | 4 | Total |
|---|---|---|---|---|---|
| #15 Flames | 0 | 10 | 10 | 0 | 20 |
| • Runnin' Bulldogs | 14 | 13 | 0 | 7 | 34 |

- Date: October 10
- Location: Ernest W. Spangler Stadium
  Boiling Springs, NC
- Game start: 7:00 PM EDT
- Game attendance: 3,545

=== @ Monmouth ===
Liberty @ Monmouth

| Team | 1 | 2 | 3 | 4 | OT | Total |
|---|---|---|---|---|---|---|
| #22 Flames | 0 | 0 | 0 | 17 | 0 | 17 |
| • Hawks | 0 | 7 | 0 | 10 | 3 | 20 |

- Date: October 17
- Location: Kessler Field
  West Long Beach, NJ
- Game start: 1:00 PM EDT
- Game attendance: 8,300

=== Kennesaw State ===
Kennesaw State @ Liberty

| Team | 1 | 2 | 3 | 4 | Total |
|---|---|---|---|---|---|
| Owls | 7 | 0 | 7 | 21 | 35 |
| • Flames | 7 | 17 | 7 | 14 | 45 |

- Date: October 24
- Location: Williams Stadium
  Lynchburg, VA
- Game start: 7:00 PM EDT
- Game attendance: 20,393

=== Presbyterian ===
Presbyterian @ Liberty

| Team | 1 | 2 | 3 | 4 | Total |
|---|---|---|---|---|---|
| Blue Hose | 3 | 0 | 7 | 3 | 13 |
| • Flames | 0 | 7 | 0 | 14 | 21 |

- Date: November 7
- Location: Williams Stadium
  Lynchburg, VA
- Game start: 3:30 PM EST
- Game attendance: 14,248

=== @ Charleston Southern ===
Liberty @ Charleston Southern

| Team | 1 | 2 | 3 | 4 | Total |
|---|---|---|---|---|---|
| Flames | 7 | 7 | 7 | 3 | 24 |
| • #11 Buccaneers | 7 | 3 | 14 | 7 | 31 |

- Date: November 14
- Location: Buccaneer Field
  Charleston, SC
- Game start: 2:00 PM EST
- Game attendance: 4,781

=== Coastal Carolina ===
Coastal Carolina @ Liberty

| Team | 1 | 2 | 3 | 4 | Total |
|---|---|---|---|---|---|
| #4 Chanticleers | 0 | 7 | 0 | 14 | 21 |
| • Flames | 7 | 0 | 7 | 10 | 24 |

- Date: November 21
- Location: Williams Stadium
  Lynchburg, VA
- Game start: 7:00 PM EST
- Game attendance: 18,955

== Ranking movements ==
Ranking movements Legend: ██ Increase in ranking ██ Decrease in ranking — = Not ranked RV = Received votes
| | Week | | | | | | | | | | | | | |
| Poll | Pre | 1 | 2 | 3 | 4 | 5 | 6 | 7 | 8 | 9 | 10 | 11 | 12 | Final |
|---|---|---|---|---|---|---|---|---|---|---|---|---|---|---|
| STATS FCS | 15 | 15 | 15 | 10 | 18 | 15 | 22 | RV | RV | RV | — | — | RV | RV |
| Coaches | 14 | 13 | 14 | 10 | 18 | 15 | 22 | RV | RV | — | — | — | — | — |
