= 2015 Dayton Flyers football team =

American college football season

2015 Dayton Flyers football

PFL co-champion

NCAA Division I First Round, L 7–24 vs. Western Illinois
- Conference: Pioneer Football League
- Record: 10–2 (7–1 PFL)
- Head coach: Rick Chamberlin (8th season)
- Offensive coordinator: Eric Evans (2nd season)
- Defensive coordinator: Landon Fox (6th season)
- Home stadium: Welcome Stadium

2015 Pioneer Football League standings
	Conf.			Overall
Team	W		L	W		L
Dayton +^	7	–	1	10	–	2
San Diego +	7	–	1	9	–	2
Jacksonville *	6	–	2	9	–	2
Morehead State	6	–	2	7	–	4
Butler	4	–	4	6	–	5
Drake	4	–	4	5	–	6
Marist	4	–	4	5	–	6
Campbell	3	–	5	5	–	6
Stetson	1	–	7	3	–	8
Valparaiso	1	–	7	2	–	9
Davidson	1	–	7	2	–	9
+ – Conference co-champions; ^ – FCS playoff participant; * Jacksonville ineligible for PFL title and FCS playoffs due to matters regarding the PFL's financial aid rules

The 2015 Dayton Flyers football team represented the University of Dayton as a member of the Pioneer Football League (PFL) during the 2015 NCAA Division I FCS football season. Led by eighth-year head coach Rick Chamberlin, the Flyers compiled an overall record of 10–2 with a mark of 7–1 in conference play, sharing the PFL with San Diego. Due to their head-to-head victory over San Diego, the Flyers received the conference's automatic bid to the NCAA Division I Football Championship playoffs. where they lost in the first round to Western Illinois. Dayton played home games at Welcome Stadium in Dayton, Ohio.

== Schedule ==
Date	Time	Opponent	Site	TV	Result	Attendance
September 5	12:00 pm	at Robert Morris*	Joe Walton Stadium; Moon Township, PA		W 27–24	1,329
September 19	1:00 pm	Duquesne*	Welcome Stadium; Dayton, OH	TWCS	W 24–13	4,119
September 26	6:00 pm	Kennesaw State*	Welcome Stadium; Dayton, OH		W 31–27	2,512
October 3	1:00 pm	at Stetson	Spec Martin Stadium; DeLand, FL		W 27–14	3,164
October 10	1:00 pm	San Diego	Welcome Stadium; Dayton, OH		W 13–12	2,556
October 17	2:00 pm	at Valparaiso	Brown Field; Valparaiso, IN		W 44–14	3,136
October 24	6:00 pm	Butler	Welcome Stadium; Dayton, OH		W 27–24	3,766
October 31	1:00 pm	Jacksonville	Welcome Stadium; Dayton, OH		W 31–14	2,275
November 7	1:00 pm	at Morehead State	Jayne Stadium; Morehead, KY		W 20–15	8,294
November 14	1:00 pm	Marist	Welcome Stadium; Dayton, OH	TWCS	W 28–21	3,118
November 21	2:00 pm	at Drake	Drake Stadium; Des Moines, IA (rivalry)		L 17–27	1,330
November 28	12:00 pm	Western Illinois	Welcome Stadium; Dayton, OH (NCAA Division I First Round)	ESPN3	L 7–24	997
*Non-conference game; All times are in Eastern time

== Game summaries ==
=== @ Robert Morris ===
	1	2	3	4	Total
Flyers	0	0	17	10	27
Colonials	0	10	0	14	24

=== Duquesne ===
	1	2	3	4	Total
Dukes	6	0	7	0	13
Flyers	3	0	14	7	24

=== Kennesaw State ===
	1	2	3	4	Total
Owls	13	14	0	0	27
Flyers	7	14	7	3	31

=== @ Stetson ===
	1	2	3	4	Total
Flyers	10	7	10	0	27
Hatters	7	0	0	7	14

=== San Diego ===
	1	2	3	4	Total
Toreros	6	3	0	3	12
Flyers	3	0	10	0	13

=== @ Valparaiso ===
	1	2	3	4	Total
Flyers	14	3	24	3	44
Crusaders	7	7	0	0	14

=== Butler ===
	1	2	3	4	Total
Bulldogs	10	7	7	0	24
Flyers	7	7	3	10	27

=== Jacksonville ===
	1	2	3	4	Total
Dolphins	0	0	7	7	14
Flyers	7	17	7	0	31

=== @ Morehead State ===
	1	2	3	4	Total
Flyers	7	7	0	6	20
Eagles	15	0	0	0	15

=== Marist ===
	1	2	3	4	Total
Red Foxes	0	0	14	7	21
Flyers	10	7	3	8	28

=== @ Drake ===
	1	2	3	4	Total
Flyers	0	0	7	10	17
Bulldogs	7	14	0	6	27

=== Western Illinois—NCAA Division I First Round ===
	1	2	3	4	Total
Leathernecks	0	10	7	7	24
Flyers	7	0	0	0	7
