= 2015 Campbell Fighting Camels football team =

American college football season

2015 Campbell Fighting Camels football
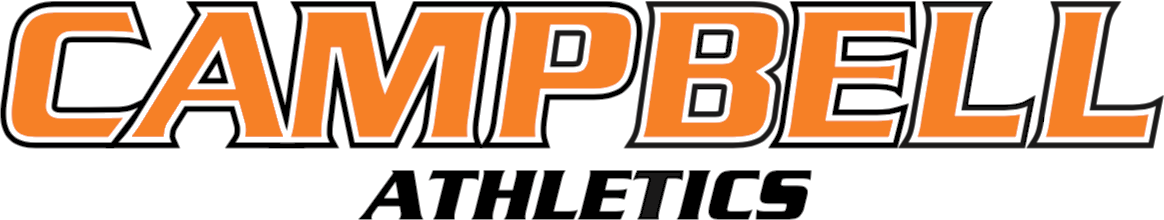
- Conference: Pioneer Football League
- Record: 5–6 (3–5 PFL)
- Head coach: Mike Minter (3rd season)
- Offensive coordinator: Landon Mariani (3rd season)
- Defensive coordinator: Craig Cox (3rd season)
- Home stadium: Barker–Lane Stadium

2015 Pioneer Football League standings
	Conf.			Overall
Team	W		L	W		L
Dayton +^	7	–	1	10	–	2
San Diego +	7	–	1	9	–	2
Jacksonville *	6	–	2	9	–	2
Morehead State	6	–	2	7	–	4
Butler	4	–	4	6	–	5
Drake	4	–	4	5	–	6
Marist	4	–	4	5	–	6
Campbell	3	–	5	5	–	6
Stetson	1	–	7	3	–	8
Valparaiso	1	–	7	2	–	9
Davidson	1	–	7	2	–	9
+ – Conference co-champions; ^ – FCS playoff participant; * Jacksonville ineligible for PFL title and FCS playoffs due to matters regarding the PFL's financial aid rules

The 2015 Campbell Fighting Camels football team represented Campbell University in the 2015 NCAA Division I FCS football season. They were led by third-year head coach Mike Minter and played their home games at Barker–Lane Stadium. They were a member of the Pioneer Football League. They finished the season 5–6, 3–5 in PFL play to finish in seventh place.

== Schedule ==
Date	Time	Opponent	Site	Result	Attendance
September 3	7:00 pm	Pikeville*	Barker–Lane Stadium; Buies Creek, NC	W 41–20	5,085
September 12	6:00 pm	Chowan*	Barker–Lane Stadium; Buies Creek, NC	W 35–3	5,582
September 19	7:00 pm	at Presbyterian*	Bailey Memorial Stadium; Clinton, SC	L 13–23	4,102
September 26	12:00 pm	at Butler	Butler Bowl; Indianapolis, IN	L 24–25	4,537
October 3	6:00 pm	Drake	Barker–Lane Stadium; Buies Creek, NC	W 24–14	4,620
October 10	6:00 pm	Marist	Barker–Lane Stadium; Buies Creek, NC	L 10–13	3,460
October 17	1:00 pm	at Stetson	Spec Martin Stadium; DeLand, FL	W 16–6	3,100
October 24	4:00 pm	Morehead State^{†}	Barker–Lane Stadium; Buies Creek, NC	L 27–31	6,580
October 31	1:00 pm	at Davidson	Richardson Stadium; Davidson, NC	W 39–9	3,821
November 7	3:00 pm	at San Diego	Torero Stadium; San Diego, CA	L 27–31	1,536
November 14	1:00 pm	Jacksonville	Barker–Lane Stadium; Buies Creek, NC	L 14–20	4,170
*Non-conference game; ^{†}Homecoming; All times are in Eastern time

== Game summaries ==
=== Pikeville ===
	1	2	3	4	Total
Bears	0	10	7	3	20
Fighting Camels	7	14	7	13	41

=== Chowan ===
	1	2	3	4	Total
Hawks	0	0	0	3	3
Fighting Camels	14	14	0	7	35

=== At Presbyterian ===
	1	2	3	4	Total
Fighting Camels	6	0	0	7	13
Blue Hose	2	14	7	0	23

=== At Butler ===
	1	2	3	4	Total
Fighting Camels	14	0	0	10	24
Bulldogs	10	0	0	15	25

=== Drake ===
	1	2	3	4	Total
Bulldogs	0	7	7	0	14
Fighting Camels	3	7	7	7	24

=== Marist ===
	1	2	3	4	Total
Red Foxes	3	0	7	3	13
Fighting Camels	7	0	0	3	10

=== At Stetson ===
	1	2	3	4	Total
Fighting Camels	0	3	13	0	16
Hatters	3	3	0	0	6

=== Morehead State ===
	1	2	3	4	Total
Eagles	7	3	7	14	31
Fighting Camels	7	6	0	14	27

=== At Davidson ===
	1	2	3	4	Total
Fighting Camels	7	10	7	15	39
Wildcats	0	0	9	0	9

=== At San Diego ===
	1	2	3	4	Total
Fighting Camels	14	7	6	0	27
Toreros	7	16	8	0	31

=== Jacksonville ===
	1	2	3	4	Total
Dolphins	10	0	7	3	20
Fighting Camels	0	0	0	14	14
