= 2015 Saint Francis Red Flash football team =

American college football season

2015 Saint Francis Red Flash football
- Conference: Northeast Conference
- Record: 6–4 (4–2 NEC)
- Head coach: Chris Villarrial (6th season)
- Offensive coordinator: Eric Long
- Defensive coordinator: Michael Craig
- Home stadium: DeGol Field

2015 Northeast Conference football standings
	Conf.			Overall
Team	W		L	W		L
Duquesne $^	5	–	1	8	–	4
Saint Francis (PA)	4	–	2	6	–	4
Sacred Heart	3	–	3	6	–	5
Bryant	3	–	3	5	–	6
Central Connecticut	3	–	3	4	–	7
Robert Morris	2	–	4	4	–	7
Wagner	1	–	5	1	–	10
$ – Conference champion; ^ – FCS playoff participant

The 2015 Saint Francis Red Flash football team represented Saint Francis University in the 2015 NCAA Division I FCS football season. They were led by sixth year head coach Chris Villarrial and played their home games at DeGol Field. They were a member of the Northeast Conference. They finished the season 6–4, 4–2 in NEC play to finish in second place.

== Schedule ==
Date	Time	Opponent	Site	TV	Result	Attendance
September 5	12:00 p.m.	Georgetown*	DeGol Field; Loretto, PA	NECFR	W 48–20	1,836
September 12	6:00 p.m.	at Towson*	Johnny Unitas Stadium; Towson, MD		L 20–35	7,911
September 19	4:00 p.m.	at No. 16 Youngstown State*	Stambaugh Stadium; Youngstown, OH	ESPN3	L 3–48	17,428
September 26	1:00 p.m.	University of Faith (FL)±*	DeGol Field; Loretto, PA	NECFR	W 78–0	N/A
October 3	1:00 p.m.	at East Tennessee State*	Kermit Tipton Stadium; Johnson City, TN		W 58–9	6,000
October 17	3:30 p.m.	Wagner	DeGol Field; Loretto, PA	ESPN3	W 43–14	1,106
October 24	1:00 p.m.	at Bryant	Bulldog Stadium; Smithfield, RI	NECFR	L 24–26	5,908
October 31	12:00 p.m.	Sacred Heart^{†}	DeGol Field; Loretto, PA	NECFR	W 23–14	1,837
November 7	12:00 p.m.	at Central Connecticut	Arute Field; New Britain, CT	ESPN3	W 22–13	3,113
November 14	12:00 p.m.	Robert Morris	DeGol Field; Loretto, PA		W 21–0	1,547
November 21	12:00 p.m.	at Duquesne	Arthur J. Rooney Athletic Field; Pittsburgh, PA		L 20–30	1,721
*Non-conference game; ^{†}Homecoming; Rankings from STATS Poll released prior to the game; All times are in Eastern time

± University of Faith didn't meet NCAA accreditation guidelines and all stats and records from this game do not count
