= 2015 Valparaiso Crusaders football team =

American college football season

2015 Valparaiso Crusaders football
- Conference: Pioneer Football League
- Record: 2–9 (1–7 PFL)
- Head coach: Dave Cecchini (2nd season)
- Offensive coordinator: Jason Miran (2nd season)
- Defensive coordinator: Ernest Moore (2nd season)
- Home stadium: Brown Field

2015 Pioneer Football League standings
	Conf.			Overall
Team	W		L	W		L
Dayton +^	7	–	1	10	–	2
San Diego +	7	–	1	9	–	2
Jacksonville *	6	–	2	9	–	2
Morehead State	6	–	2	7	–	4
Butler	4	–	4	6	–	5
Drake	4	–	4	5	–	6
Marist	4	–	4	5	–	6
Campbell	3	–	5	5	–	6
Stetson	1	–	7	3	–	8
Valparaiso	1	–	7	2	–	9
Davidson	1	–	7	2	–	9
+ – Conference co-champions; ^ – FCS playoff participant; * Jacksonville ineligible for PFL title and FCS playoffs due to matters regarding the PFL's financial aid rules

The 2015 Valparaiso Crusaders football team represented Valparaiso University in the 2015 NCAA Division I FCS football season. They were led by second-year head coach Dave Cecchini and played their home games at Brown Field. They were a member of the Pioneer Football League. They finished the season 1–9, 1–7 in PFL play to finish in a three-way tie for eighth place.

== Schedule ==
Date	Time	Opponent	Site	TV	Result	Attendance	Source
September 5	6:00 pm	at No. 17 Eastern Kentucky*	Roy Kidd Stadium; Richmond, KY	OVCDN	L 10–52	12,800	
September 12	1:00 pm	Sacred Heart*	Brown Field; Valparaiso, IN		L 3–56	3,019	
September 19	1:00 pm	College of Faith (AR)±*	Brown Field; Valparaiso, IN		W 86–0	1,212	
September 26	12:30 pm	San Diego^{†}	Brown Field; Valparaiso, IN		L 6–38	3,183	
October 3	12:00 pm	at Davidson	Richardson Stadium; Davidson, NC		W 42–35	647	
October 10	1:00 pm	at Drake	Drake Stadium; Des Moines, IA		L 7–34	2,336	
October 17	1:00 pm	Dayton	Brown Field; Valparaiso, IN		L 14–44	3,136	
October 24	1:00 pm	Stetson	Brown Field; Valparaiso, IN		L 14–37	729	
November 7	12:00 pm	at Butler	Butler Bowl; Indianapolis, IN (Hoosier Helmet Trophy)		L 21–42	5,113	
November 14	1:00 pm	Morehead State	Brown Field; Valparaiso, IN		L 29–36	1,162	
November 21	12:00 pm	at Jacksonville	D. B. Milne Field; Jacksonville, FL		L 13–58	2,388	
*Non-conference game; ^{†}Homecoming; Rankings from STATS Poll released prior to the game; All times are in Eastern time

± College of Faith didn't meet NCAA accreditation guidelines and all stats and records from this game do not count.
