= 2015 Morehead State Eagles football team =

American college football season

2015 Morehead State Eagles football
- Conference: Pioneer Football League
- Record: 7–4 (6–2 PFL)
- Head coach: Rob Tenyer (3rd season)
- Offensive coordinator: Craig Mullins
- Defensive coordinator: Dontae Wright
- Home stadium: Jayne Stadium

2015 Pioneer Football League standings
	Conf.			Overall
Team	W		L	W		L
Dayton +^	7	–	1	10	–	2
San Diego +	7	–	1	9	–	2
Jacksonville *	6	–	2	9	–	2
Morehead State	6	–	2	7	–	4
Butler	4	–	4	6	–	5
Drake	4	–	4	5	–	6
Marist	4	–	4	5	–	6
Campbell	3	–	5	5	–	6
Stetson	1	–	7	3	–	8
Valparaiso	1	–	7	2	–	9
Davidson	1	–	7	2	–	9
+ – Conference co-champions; ^ – FCS playoff participant; * Jacksonville ineligible for PFL title and FCS playoffs due to matters regarding the PFL's financial aid rules

The 2015 Morehead State Eagles football team represented Morehead State University in the 2015 NCAA Division I FCS football season. They were led by third-year head coach Rob Tenyer and played their home games at Jayne Stadium. They were a member of the Pioneer Football League. They finished the season 7–4, 6–2 in PFL play to finish in third place.

== Schedule ==
Date	Time	Opponent	Site	TV	Result	Attendance
September 5	6:00 pm	at No. 12 James Madison*	Bridgeforth Stadium; Harrisonburg, VA		L 7–56	22,080
September 12	1:30 pm	at VMI*	Alumni Memorial Field; Lexington, VA	ESPN3	L 40–43	5,016
September 19	7:00 pm	Kentucky Christian*	Jayne Stadium; Morehead, KY		W 28–0	9,176
September 26	1:00 pm	Davidson	Jayne Stadium; Morehead, KY		W 34–0	7,177
October 3	1:00 pm	at Jacksonville	D. B. Milne Field; Jacksonville, FL		L 26–30	2,844
October 10	1:00 pm	Butler^{†}	Jayne Stadium; Morehead, KY		W 34–21	9,805
October 24	4:00 pm	at Campbell	Barker–Lane Stadium; Buies Creek, NC		W 31–27	6,580
October 31	1:00 pm	Drake	Jayne Stadium; Morehead, KY		W 38–35 ^{3OT}	6,567
November 7	1:00 pm	Dayton	Jayne Stadium; Morehead, KY		L 15–20	8,294
November 14	1:00 pm	at Valparaiso	Brown Field; Valparaiso, IN		W 36–29	1,162
November 21	1:00 pm	at Marist	Tenney Stadium at Leonidoff Field; Poughkeepsie, NY		W 20–17	1,526
*Non-conference game; ^{†}Homecoming; Rankings from STATS Poll released prior to the game; All times are in Eastern time
