= 2015 Coastal Carolina Chanticleers football team =

American college football season

2015 Coastal Carolina Chanticleers football

Big South co-champion

NCAA Division I First Round, L 38–41 vs. The Citadel
- Conference: Big South Conference

Ranking
- STATS: No. 16
- FCS Coaches: No. 17
- Record: 9–3 (4–2 Big South)
- Head coach: Joe Moglia (4th season)
- Offensive coordinator: Dave Patenaude (4th season)
- Offensive scheme: Pro spread
- Defensive coordinator: Clayton Carlin (4th season)
- Base defense: 4–2–5
- Home stadium: Brooks Stadium

2015 Big South Conference football standings
	Conf.			Overall
Team	W		L	W		L
No. 6 Charleston Southern $^	6	–	0	10	–	3
No. 16 Coastal Carolina ^	4	–	2	9	–	3
Liberty	3	–	3	6	–	5
Monmouth	3	–	3	5	–	6
Kennesaw State	2	–	4	6	–	5
Gardner–Webb *	2	–	4	4	–	7
Presbyterian	1	–	5	2	–	9
$ – Conference champion; ^ – FCS playoff participant; * Gardner–Webb ineligible for postseason due to APR violations; Rankings from STATS Poll

The 2015 Coastal Carolina Chanticleers football team represented Coastal Carolina University as a member of the Big South Conference during the 2015 NCAA Division I FCS football season. Led by fourth-year head coach Joe Moglia, the Chanticleers compiled an overall record of 9–3 with a mark of 4–2 in conference play, placing second in the Big South. Coastal Carolina received an at-large bid NCAA Division I Football Championship playoffs, where the Chanticleers lost in the first round to The Citadel. Coastal Carolina played home games at Brooks Stadium in Conway, South Carolina.

The Chanticleers joined the Sun Belt Conference in July 2016, initially as a full but non-football member. The football program began transition to the NCAA Division I Football Bowl Subdivision (FBS), joining Sun Belt football in 2017 and gaining full FBS membership and bowl eligibility in 2018.

== Schedule ==
Date	Time	Opponent	Rank	Site	TV	Result	Attendance
September 5	7:00 pm	at Furman*	No. 5	Paladin Stadium; Greenville, SC	ESPN3	W 38–35	6,563
September 12	6:00 pm	at South Carolina State*	No. 3	Oliver C. Dawson Stadium; Orangeburg, SC		W 41–14	12,023
September 19	6:00 pm	Western Illinois*	No. 2	Brooks Stadium; Conway, SC	BSN	W 34–27	10,311
September 26	6:00 pm	Bryant*	No. 2	Brooks Stadium; Conway, SC	BSN	W 31–17	10,311
October 3	6:00 pm	Alabama A&M*^{†}	No. 2	Brooks Stadium; Conway, SC	BSN	W 55–0	9,093
October 10	2:00 pm	Presbyterian	No. 2	Brooks Stadium; Conway, SC	ESPN3	W 24–17	8,039
October 24	1:00 pm	at Monmouth	No. 2	Kessler Field; West Long Branch, NJ	ESPN3	W 23–20	4,591
October 31	2:00 pm	at No. 24 Charleston Southern	No. 2	Buccaneer Field; Charleston, SC	ASN	L 25–33	5,311
November 7	2:00 pm	Gardner–Webb	No. 8	Brooks Stadium; Conway, SC	ASN	W 46–0	8,422
November 14	2:00 pm	Kennesaw State	No. 4	Brooks Stadium; Conway, SC	BSN	W 45–13	8,802
November 19	7:00 pm	at Liberty	No. 4	Williams Stadium; Lynchburg, VA (rivalry)	ESPNews	L 21–24	18,955
November 28	2:00 pm	No. 18 The Citadel*	No. 10	Brooks Stadium; Conway, SC (NCAA Division I First Round)	ESPN3	L 38–41	6,753
*Non-conference game; ^{†}Homecoming; Rankings from STATS Poll released prior to the game; All times are in Eastern time

== Game summaries ==
=== At Furman ===
	1	2	3	4	Total
#5 Chanticleers	15	6	7	10	38
Paladins	7	14	0	14	35

=== At South Carolina State ===
	1	2	3	4	Total
#3 Chanticleers	22	10	9	0	41
Bulldogs	0	0	7	7	14

=== Western Illinois ===
	1	2	3	4	Total
Leathernecks	0	7	14	6	27
#2 Chanticleers	3	7	10	14	34

=== Bryant ===
	1	2	3	4	Total
Bulldogs	10	7	0	0	17
#2 Chanticleers	7	10	7	7	31

=== Alabama A&M ===
	1	2	3	4	Total
Bulldogs	0	0	0	0	0
#2 Chanticleers	6	32	14	3	55

=== Presbyterian ===
	1	2	3	4	Total
Blue Hose	3	0	7	7	17
#2 Chanticleers	0	12	5	7	24

=== At Monmouth ===
	1	2	3	4	Total
#2 Chanticleers	3	14	3	3	23
Hawks	7	6	7	0	20

=== At Charleston Southern ===
	1	2	3	4	Total
#2 Chanticleers	15	0	3	7	25
#24 Buccaneers	13	14	3	3	33

=== Gardner–Webb ===
	1	2	3	4	Total
Runnin' Bulldogs	0	0	0	0	0
#8 Chanticleers	15	14	14	3	46

=== Kennesaw State ===
	1	2	3	4	Total
Owls	6	0	7	0	13
#4 Chanticleers	13	18	7	7	45

=== At Liberty ===
	1	2	3	4	Total
#4 Chanticleers	0	14	0	7	21
Flames	7	0	7	10	24

=== The Citadel–NCAA Division I First Round ===
	1	2	3	4	Total
#18 Bulldogs	14	0	14	13	41
#10 Chanticleers	7	14	7	10	38

== Ranking movements ==
Ranking movements Legend: ██ Increase in ranking ██ Decrease in ranking т = Tied with team above or below ( ) = First-place votes
	Week													
Poll	Pre	1	2	3	4	5	6	7	8	9	10	11	12	Final
STATS FCS	5	3 (24)	2 (36)	2 (36)	2 (40)	2 (39)	3 (30)	2 (27)	2 (33)	8	4	4	10–T	16
Coaches	5	1 (4)	1 (14)	1 (18)	1 (17)	1 (16)	1 (15)	1 (15)	1 (15)	8	4	4	9	17
