= 2015 Presbyterian Blue Hose football team =

American college football season

2015 Presbyterian Blue Hose football
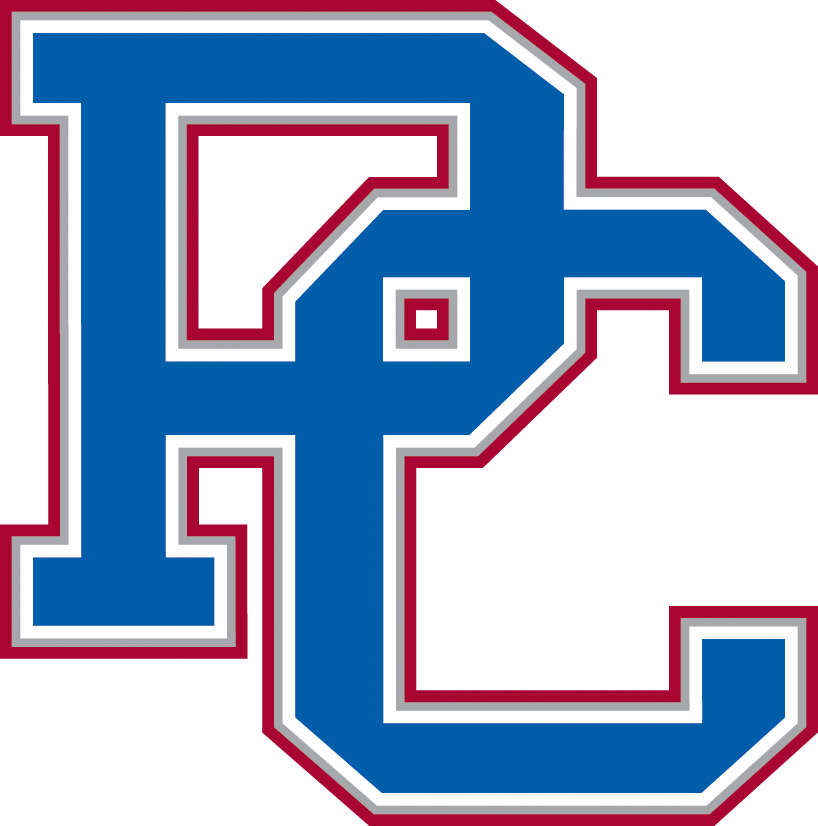
- Conference: Big South Conference
- Record: 2–9 (1–5 Big South)
- Head coach: Harold Nichols (7th season)
- Offensive coordinator: Todd Varn
- Defensive coordinator: Tommy Spangler
- Home stadium: Bailey Memorial Stadium

2015 Big South Conference football standings
	Conf.			Overall
Team	W		L	W		L
No. 6 Charleston Southern $^	6	–	0	10	–	3
No. 16 Coastal Carolina ^	4	–	2	9	–	3
Liberty	3	–	3	6	–	5
Monmouth	3	–	3	5	–	6
Kennesaw State	2	–	4	6	–	5
Gardner–Webb *	2	–	4	4	–	7
Presbyterian	1	–	5	2	–	9
$ – Conference champion; ^ – FCS playoff participant; * Gardner–Webb ineligible for postseason due to APR violations; Rankings from STATS Poll

The 2015 Presbyterian Blue Hose football team represented Presbyterian College in the 2015 NCAA Division I FCS football season. They were led by seventh-year head coach Harold Nichols and played their home games at Bailey Memorial Stadium. They were a member of the Big South Conference. They finished the season 2–9, 1–5 in Big South play to finish in last place.

== Schedule ==
Date	Time	Opponent	Site	TV	Result	Attendance
September 5	3:30 pm	at Miami (OH)*	Yager Stadium; Oxford, OH	ESPN3	L 7–26	14,397
September 12	12:00 pm	at Charlotte*	Jerry Richardson Stadium; Charlotte, NC	ASN	L 10–34	16,631
September 19	7:00 pm	Campbell*	Bailey Memorial Stadium; Clinton, SC	BSN	W 23–13	4,102
September 26	7:00 pm	No. 8 Chattanooga*	Bailey Memorial Stadium; Clinton, SC	BSN	L 0–21	3,582
October 3	3:30 pm	at Western Carolina*	E. J. Whitmire Stadium; Cullowhee, NC	WMYA	L 21–33	9,191
October 10	2:00 pm	at No. 2 Coastal Carolina	Brooks Stadium; Conway, NC	ESPN3	L 17–24	8,039
October 17	2:00 pm	Charleston Southern^{†}	Bailey Memorial Stadium; Clinton, SC	BSN	L 7–10	4,624
October 31	2:00 pm	Gardner–Webb	Bailey Memorial Stadium; Clinton, SC	BSN	L 10–14	3,163
November 7	3:30 pm	at Liberty	Williams Stadium; Lynchburg, VA	ESPN3	L 13–21	14,248
November 14	12:00 pm	at Monmouth	Kessler Field; West Long Branch, NJ	ESPN3	L 16–21	1,811
November 21	2:00 pm	Kennesaw State	Bailey Memorial Stadium; Clinton, SC	BSN	W 14–6	3,577
*Non-conference game; ^{†}Homecoming; Rankings from STATS Poll released prior to the game; All times are in Eastern time

- Source: Schedule

== Game summaries ==
=== At Miami (OH) ===
	1	2	3	4	Total
Blue Hose	0	0	7	0	7
RedHawks	7	6	0	13	26

=== At Charlotte ===
	1	2	3	4	Total
Blue Hose	0	0	0	10	10
49ers	7	17	10	0	34

=== Campbell ===
	1	2	3	4	Total
Fighting Camels	6	0	0	7	13
Blue Hose	2	14	7	0	23

=== Chattanooga ===
	1	2	3	4	Total
#8 Mocs	7	7	0	7	21
Blue Hose	0	0	0	0	0

=== At Western Carolina ===
	1	2	3	4	Total
Blue Hose	7	7	7	0	21
Catamounts	7	10	3	13	33

=== At Coastal Carolina ===
	1	2	3	4	Total
Blue Hose	3	0	7	7	17
#2 Chanticleers	0	12	5	7	24

=== Charleston Southern ===
	1	2	3	4	Total
Buccaneers	3	0	0	7	10
Blue Hose	0	7	0	0	7

=== Gardner–Webb ===
	1	2	3	4	Total
Runnin' Bulldogs	0	7	7	0	14
Blue Hose	0	7	0	3	10

=== At Liberty ===
	1	2	3	4	Total
Blue Hose	3	0	7	3	13
Flames	0	7	0	14	21

=== At Monmouth ===
	1	2	3	4	Total
Blue Hose	3	7	0	6	16
Hawks	0	7	14	0	21

=== Kennesaw State ===
	1	2	3	4	Total
Owls	0	3	0	3	6
Blue Hose	0	7	0	7	14
