= 2015 UC Davis Aggies football team =

American college football season

2015 UC Davis Aggies football
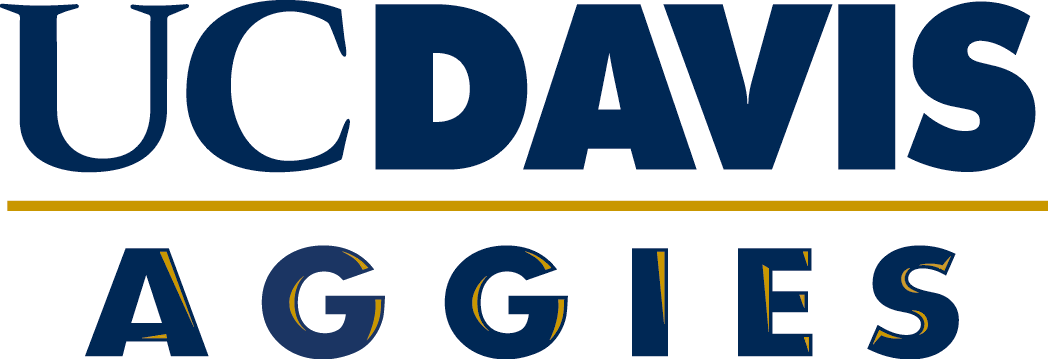
- Conference: Big Sky Conference
- Record: 2–9 (2–6 Big Sky)
- Head coach: Ron Gould (3rd season)
- Offensive coordinator: Kevin Daft (4th season)
- Defensive coordinator: Bert Watts (3rd season)
- Home stadium: Aggie Stadium

2015 Big Sky Conference football standings
| | Conf. | | | Overall |
| Team | W | | L | W | | L |
|---|---|---|---|---|---|---|
| No. 18 Southern Utah $^ | 7 | – | 1 | 8 | – | 4 |
| No. 10 Portland State ^ | 6 | – | 2 | 9 | – | 3 |
| No. 14 Montana ^ | 6 | – | 2 | 8 | – | 5 |
| North Dakota | 5 | – | 3 | 7 | – | 4 |
| Northern Arizona | 5 | – | 3 | 7 | – | 4 |
| Eastern Washington | 5 | – | 3 | 6 | – | 5 |
| Weber State | 5 | – | 3 | 6 | – | 5 |
| Northern Colorado | 3 | – | 5 | 6 | – | 5 |
| Montana State | 3 | – | 5 | 5 | – | 6 |
| Cal Poly | 3 | – | 5 | 4 | – | 7 |
| UC Davis | 2 | – | 6 | 2 | – | 9 |
| Idaho State | 1 | – | 7 | 2 | – | 9 |
| Sacramento State | 1 | – | 7 | 2 | – | 9 |
$ – Conference champion; ^ – FCS playoff participant; Rankings from STATS Poll

The 2015 UC Davis football team represented the University of California, Davis as a member of the Big Sky Conference during the 2015 NCAA Division I FCS football season. Led by third-year head coach Ron Gould, UC Davis compiled an overall record of 2–9 with a mark of 2–6 in conference play, placing 11th in the Big Sky. The Aggies played home games at Aggie Stadium in Davis, California.

== Schedule ==
| Date | Time | Opponent | Site | TV | Result | Attendance |
|---|---|---|---|---|---|---|
| September 3 | 7:00 pm | at Nevada* | Mackay Stadium; Reno, NV | Campus Insiders | L 17–31 | 21,483 |
| September 12 | 6:00 pm | South Dakota* | Aggie Stadium; Davis, CA | WBS | L 17–27 | 5,112 |
| September 19 | 9:00 pm | at Hawaii* | Aloha Stadium; Halawa, HI | Oceanic PPV | L 27–47 | 25,714 |
| September 26 | 11:00 am | at North Dakota | Alerus Center; Grand Forks, ND | Midco SN | L 24–31 | 8,450 |
| October 3 | 1:00 pm | No. 13 Montana | Aggie Stadium; Davis, CA | RTNW | L 13–27 | 6,241 |
| October 10 | 4:00 pm | Northern Arizona^{†} | Aggie Stadium; Davis, CA | WBS | W 38–24 | 6,432 |
| October 17 | 12:35 pm | at Northern Colorado | Nottingham Field; Greeley, CO | WBS | L 27–56 | 4,525 |
| October 24 | 4:00 pm | Southern Utah | Aggie Stadium; Davis, CA | | L 6–34 | 4,640 |
| November 7 | 11:00 am | at Weber State | Stewart Stadium; Ogden, UT | | L 3–23 | 5,899 |
| November 14 | 2:00 pm | Cal Poly | Aggie Stadium; Davis, CA (Battle for the Golden Horseshoe) | | L 38–55 | 6,197 |
| November 21 | 2:30 pm | at Sacramento State | Hornet Stadium; Sacramento, CA (Causeway Classic) | CSNCA | W 35–21 | 10,237 |
*Non-conference game; ^{†}Homecoming; Rankings from STATS Poll released prior to the game; All times are in Pacific time

== Game summaries ==
=== At Nevada ===
| | 1 | 2 | 3 | 4 | Total |
|---|---|---|---|---|---|
| Aggies | 0 | 3 | 0 | 14 | 17 |
| Wolf Pack | 7 | 14 | 3 | 7 | 31 |

=== South Dakota ===
| | 1 | 2 | 3 | 4 | Total |
|---|---|---|---|---|---|
| Coyotes | 7 | 13 | 7 | 0 | 27 |
| Aggies | 3 | 0 | 14 | 0 | 17 |

=== At Hawaii ===
| | 1 | 2 | 3 | 4 | Total |
|---|---|---|---|---|---|
| Aggies | 3 | 7 | 0 | 17 | 27 |
| Rainbow Warriors | 3 | 10 | 13 | 21 | 47 |

=== At North Dakota ===
| | 1 | 2 | 3 | 4 | Total |
|---|---|---|---|---|---|
| Aggies | 7 | 3 | 7 | 7 | 24 |
| North Dakota | 14 | 7 | 10 | 0 | 31 |

=== Montana ===
| | 1 | 2 | 3 | 4 | Total |
|---|---|---|---|---|---|
| #13 Grizzlies | 7 | 7 | 7 | 6 | 27 |
| Aggies | 6 | 7 | 0 | 0 | 13 |

=== Northern Arizona ===
| | 1 | 2 | 3 | 4 | Total |
|---|---|---|---|---|---|
| Lumberjacks | 7 | 10 | 0 | 7 | 24 |
| Aggies | 14 | 3 | 14 | 7 | 38 |

=== At Northern Colorado ===
| | 1 | 2 | 3 | 4 | Total |
|---|---|---|---|---|---|
| Aggies | 0 | 3 | 10 | 14 | 27 |
| Bears | 21 | 21 | 14 | 0 | 56 |

=== Southern Utah ===
| | 1 | 2 | 3 | 4 | Total |
|---|---|---|---|---|---|
| Thunderbirds | 0 | 7 | 13 | 14 | 34 |
| Aggies | 3 | 3 | 0 | 0 | 6 |

=== At Weber State ===
| | 1 | 2 | 3 | 4 | Total |
|---|---|---|---|---|---|
| Aggies | 3 | 0 | 0 | 0 | 3 |
| Wildcats | 3 | 17 | 3 | 0 | 23 |

=== Cal Poly ===
| | 1 | 2 | 3 | 4 | Total |
|---|---|---|---|---|---|
| Mustangs | 21 | 13 | 7 | 14 | 55 |
| Aggies | 14 | 0 | 17 | 7 | 38 |

=== At Sacramento State ===
| | 1 | 2 | 3 | 4 | Total |
|---|---|---|---|---|---|
| Aggies | 7 | 14 | 7 | 7 | 35 |
| Hornets | 0 | 0 | 14 | 7 | 21 |
