= 2015 Portland State Vikings football team =

American college football season

2015 Portland State Vikings football
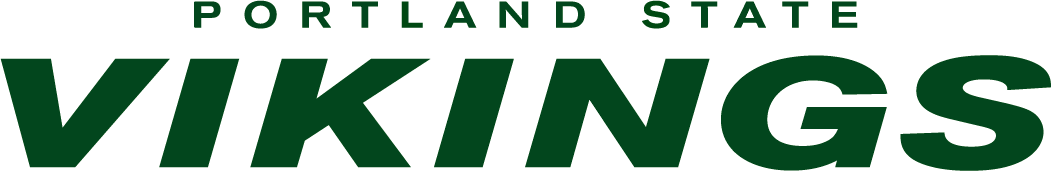

FCS Playoffs Second Round, L 17–29 vs. Northern Iowa
- Conference: Big Sky Conference

Ranking
- STATS: No. 10
- FCS Coaches: No. 10
- Record: 9–3 (6–2 Big Sky)
- Head coach: Bruce Barnum (1st season)
- Offensive coordinator: Steve Cooper (1st season)
- Offensive scheme: Pistol
- Defensive coordinator: Malik Roberson (1st season)
- Base defense: 3–3–5
- Home stadium: Providence Park; Hillsboro Stadium

2015 Big Sky Conference football standings
	Conf.			Overall
Team	W		L	W		L
No. 18 Southern Utah $^	7	–	1	8	–	4
No. 10 Portland State ^	6	–	2	9	–	3
No. 14 Montana ^	6	–	2	8	–	5
North Dakota	5	–	3	7	–	4
Northern Arizona	5	–	3	7	–	4
Eastern Washington	5	–	3	6	–	5
Weber State	5	–	3	6	–	5
Northern Colorado	3	–	5	6	–	5
Montana State	3	–	5	5	–	6
Cal Poly	3	–	5	4	–	7
UC Davis	2	–	6	2	–	9
Idaho State	1	–	7	2	–	9
Sacramento State	1	–	7	2	–	9
$ – Conference champion; ^ – FCS playoff participant; Rankings from STATS Poll

The 2015 Portland State Vikings football team represented Portland State University during the 2015 NCAA Division I FCS football season. They were led by first-year head coach Bruce Barnum and played their home games at Providence Park, with one home game at Hillsboro Stadium. They were a member of the Big Sky Conference. They finished the season 9–3, 6–2 in Big Sky play to finish in a tie for second place; this was the program's first winning season since 2011. They received an at-large bid to the FCS Playoffs, the Vikings first appearance in the FCS playoffs since 2000, where they lost in the second round to Northern Iowa.

On October 10, 2015, the Vikings defeated North Texas, 66–7. The 59 point margin was the largest margin of victory by an FCS team over an FBS team since the split of NCAA Division I football in 1978 into the groupings now known as FBS and FCS. Portland State also became the first FCS team to defeat two FBS teams in the same season since North Dakota State in 2007.

== Preseason ==
=== Big Sky polls ===
On July 17, 2015, the Big Sky Conference released its preseason coaches' and media polls. The Vikings were predicted to finish tied for ninth in the coaches' poll and twelfth in the media poll.

== Schedule ==
Date	Time	Opponent	Rank	Site	TV	Result	Attendance
September 5	11:00 am	at Washington State (FBS)*		Martin Stadium; Pullman, WA	P12N	W 24–17	24,302
September 12	3:05 pm	at No. 23 Idaho State	No. 24	Holt Arena; Pocatello, ID	WBS	W 34–14	7,075
September 26	2:05 pm	Western Oregon (Div. II)*	No. 17	Providence Park; Portland, OR	WBS	W 31–0	5,017
October 3	2:05 pm	North Dakota	No. 16	Hillsboro Stadium; Hillsboro, OR	WBS	L 17–19	4,765
October 10	2:00 pm	at North Texas (FBS)*	No. 25	Apogee Stadium; Denton, TX		W 66–7	19,801
October 17	12:30 pm	No. 16 Montana State	No. 17	Providence Park; Portland, OR	RTNW	W 59–42	8,110
October 24	6:05 pm	at Cal Poly	No. 14	Alex G. Spanos Stadium; San Luis Obispo, CA		W 38–35	11,075
October 31	2:05 pm	No. 17 Montana	No. 12	Providence Park; Portland, OR	WBS	W 35–16	11,045
November 7	11:00 am	at Northern Colorado	No. 10	Nottingham Field; Greeley, CO	WBS	L 32–35	4,173
November 14	2:05 pm	No. 18 Southern Utah	No. 15	Providence Park; Portland, OR	WBS	W 24–23	6,122
November 21	2:05 pm	at No. 18 Eastern Washington	No. 11	Roos Field; Cheney, WA (The Dam Cup)	WBS	W 34–31	8,649
December 5	7:00 pm	No. 15 Northern Iowa*	No. 5	Providence Park; Portland, OR (FCS Playoffs Second Round)	ESPN3	L 17–29	8,022
*Non-conference game; Rankings from STATS Poll released prior to the game; All times are in Pacific time

== Personnel ==
2015 Portland State Vikings football team roster
Players
Coaches
Offense

Pos.	#	Name	Class
QB	1	Kieran McDonagh	Sr
QB	2	Paris Penn	Jr
RB	3	David Jones	Sr
WR	4	Josh Kraght	So
WR	5	Thomas Carter III	Sr
QB	7	Alex Kuresa	Jr
WR	9	Jamarr Graves	Jr
WR	10	Blair Cavanaugh	Jr
QB	17	Aidan Wilder	Fr
QB	19	Thomas Hamilton	Fr
WR	20	Austin Baird	So
WR	21	Stevie Coury	So
RB	22	Za'Quan Summers	Jr
RB	25	Nate Tago	Jr
RB	26	Steven Long	So
RB	29	Carlos Martin	Fr
RB	32	Rey Vega	So
RB	34	Chase Morrison	Fr
RB	34	Rochon Taylor	Jr
RB	35	Mitchell Thompson	So
TE	37	Cameron Thompson	Sr
RB	40	Zack Dwyer	Jr
TE	46	Scott Hitner	Fr
WR	47	Nick Moran	So
WR	49	Jonathan Boland	Fr
OL	61	Justin Outslay	So
OL	64	Isaac Ennis	Fr
OL	65	Garrett Stauffer	Fr
OL	66	Desmoun Thompson	So
OL	67	Kyle Smith	Jr
OL	68	Cam Keizur	Jr
OL	69	Glenn Whearty	Fr
OL	70	Josh Brown	Fr
OL	72	Chad Bach	So
OL	73	Peter Fisherkeller	So
OL	74	Josh Hanson	Jr
OL	75	Alex Sirois	So
OL	76	Mike Davis	Sr
OL	78	Austin Powell	So
OL	79	Randin Crecelius	So
WR	80	Trent Riley	So
WR	82	Darnell Adams	Jr
WR	83	Alex Toureen	Sr
TE	84	Cam Sommer	Jr
WR	85	Chase Loftin	Jr
WR	86	Trevor Dye	Jr
WR	87	Justin Calo	So
TE	88	Jon Buffington	Jr
OL	91	William Dawson	So
TE	98	Dame Ndiaye	Sr
WR		Austin Benton	Fr
WR		Austin Holman	Jr
TE		Charlie Taumoepeau	Fr

Defense

Pos.	#	Name	Class
CB	6	Demetrius Jackson	Sr
S	8	Patrick Onwuasor	Sr
S	12	Walter Santiago	Sr
LB	13	Anthony McNichols	Sr
S	15	Tyler Foreman	So
CB	19	Malik Cyphers	So
CB	23	Aaron Sibley	Sr
CB	24	Artuz Manning	Fr
CB	27	Chevy Walker	Jr
CB	28	Anthony Jenkins	So
LB	30	Jeremy Lutali	Sr
LB	31	A. J. Schlatter	Fr
CB	33	Darien Washington	Jr
DE	36	Sam Bodine	Fr
DB	38	Xavier Coleman	Jr
S	39	Beau Duronslet	So
DB	41	Khalil Dawson	So
DE	42	Sadat Sulleyman	Sr
S	43	Nick Rothstein	Sr
LB	44	Brandon Brody-Heim	Sr
DB	45	Nate Salu	Fr
S	49	Brian McCormick	So
LB	50	Kawika Stant	Sr
LB	52	Zack Berg	Sr
LB	53	Austin Wolff	Jr
LB	54	Dennis Taylor	Sr
LB	55	Mosa Likio	Jr
DE	56	Perry Groves	Fr
LB	57	John Norcross	So
DE	58	Dallas House	Fr
LB	59	Cameron Schmitz	Fr
DE	63	Junior Alexis	Sr
DE	81	Jacob Nall	Jr
DE	90	Cutter Baldock	Sr
DT	92	Daniel Fusi	Sr
DT	93	John Jackson	Fr
DE	94	Michael Doman	Jr
DT	95	Savali Talalemotu	Jr
DE	96	Larry Ross	Fr
DE	99	Davond Dade	So
LB		Tommy Carey	Fr

Special teams

Pos.	#	Name	Class
K	14	Jonathan Gonzales	Jr
P, K	16	Marcus Kinsella	Jr
K, P	29	Logan Stegner	So
LS	48	Kameron Canaday	Sr
P	97	Casey Eyman	Jr

Head coach

- Bruce Barnum

Coordinators/assistant coaches

- Steve Cooper
  Offensive coordinator/Quarterbacks
- Malik Roberson
  Defensive coordinator/Linebackers
- Nick Whitworth
  Special teams coordinator/Running backs
- John Ely
  Safeties
- Jason Belford
  Defensive line
- Evan Mozzochi
  Wide receivers
- Vernon Smith Jr.
  Cornerbacks
- Matt Leunen
  Tight ends/Tackles

Legend

- (C) Team captain
- (S) Suspended
- (I) Ineligible
- Injured
- Redshirt

Roster
Last update: September 13, 2023

== Game summaries ==
=== At Washington State ===
Portland State Vikings at Washington State Cougars – Game summary

Quarter	1	2	3	4	Total
Vikings	0	0	10	14	24
Cougars	3	7	0	7	17

at Martin Stadium, Pullman, Washington

- Date: September 5
- Game time: 11:00 a.m. PDT
- Game weather: Overcast/Rain, 46 °F (8 °C)
- Game attendance: 24,302
- Referee: Steve Strimling
- TV: P12N
- Box score, Recap

Game information
First quarter
- WSU – Erik Powell 21-yard field goal, 10:51. Cougars 3–0. Drive: 11 plays, 71 yards, 4:09.

Second quarter

- WSU – Keith Harrington 24-yard pass from Luke Falk (Erik Powell kick), 7:51. Cougars 10–0. Drive: 7 plays, 77 yards, 3:09.

Third quarter

- PRST – Paris Penn 4-yard run (Jonathan Gonzales kick), 10:54. Cougars 10–7. Drive: 10 plays, 75 yards, 4:01.
- PRST – Jonathan Gonzales 42-yard field goal, 4:37. Tied 10–10. Drive: 10 plays, 54 yards, 5:17.

Fourth quarter

- PRST – Nate Tago 8-yard run (Jonathan Gonzales kick), 13:06. Vikings 17–10. Drive: 3 plays, 11 yards, 1:42.
- WSU – Gabe Marks 5-yard pass from Luke Falk (Erik Powell kick), 9:11. Tied 17–17. Drive: 11 plays, 46 yards, 3:44.
- PRST – Steven Long 1-yard run (Jonanthan Gonzales kick), 2:19. Vikings 24–17. Drive: 14 plays, 69 yards, 6:46.

Statistics	PRST	WSU
First downs	19	21
Total yards	294	411
Rushing yards	233	104
Passing yards	61	307
Turnovers	0	2
Time of possession	29:48	30:12

Team	Category	Player	Statistics
Portland State	Passing	Alex Kuresa	7/12, 61 yards
Portland State	Rushing	Alex Kuresa	16 rushes, 92 yards
Portland State	Receiving	Thomas Carter III	4 receptions, 34 yards
Washington State	Passing	Luke Falk	27/41, 289 yards, 2 TD
Washington State	Rushing	Gerard Wicks	14 rushes, 63 yards
Washington State	Receiving	Dom Williams	5 receptions, 86 yards

=== At No. 23 Idaho State ===
No. 24 Portland State Vikings at No. 23 Idaho State Bengals – Game summary

Quarter	1	2	3	4	Total
No. 24 Vikings	17	7	7	3	34
No. 23 Bengals	7	7	0	0	14

at Holt Arena, Pocatello, Idaho

- Date: September 12
- Game time: 3:05 p.m. PDT/4:05 p.m. MDT
- Game weather: Clear, 70 °F (21 °C)
- Game attendance: 7,075
- Referee: Bruce Bondi
- TV: WBS
- Box score, Recap

Game information
First quarter
- IDST – Hagen Graves 10-yard pass from Michael Sanders (Zak Johnson kick), 9:54. Bengals 7–0. Drive: 14 plays, 75 yards, 5:06.
- PRST – Kahlil Dawson 94-yard kickoff return (Jonathan Gonzales kick), 9:41. Tied 7–7.
- PRST – Trent Riley 50-yard pass from Alex Kuresa (Jonathan Gonzales kick), 7:02. Vikings 14–7. Drive: 4 plays, 66 yards, 1:41.
- PRST – Jonathan Gonzales 51-yard field goal, 4:17. Vikings 17–7. Drive: 4 plays, 0 yards, 1:30.

Second quarter

- PRST – Paris Penn 38-yard run (Jonathan Gonzales kick), 13:55. Vikings 24–7. Drive: 6 plays, 61 yards, 1:46.
- IDST – Josh Cook 48-yard pass from Michael Sanders (Zak Johnson kick), 1:15. Vikings 24–14. Drive: 5 plays, 65 yards, 1:07.

Third quarter

- PRST – Alex Kuresa 5-yard run (Jonathan Gonzales kick), 9:36. Vikings 31–14. Drive: 10 plays, 67 yards, 5:17.

Fourth quarter

- PRST – Jonathan Gonzales 36-yard field goal, 7:29. Vikings 34–14. Drive: 11 plays, 66 yards, 6:46.

Statistics	PRST	IDST
First downs	17	15
Total yards	342	242
Rushing yards	236	61
Passing yards	106	181
Turnovers	1	4
Time of possession	34:24	25:36

Team	Category	Player	Statistics
Portland State	Passing	Alex Kuresa	7/16, 106 yards, TD, INT
Portland State	Rushing	David Jones	18 rushes, 113 yards
Portland State	Receiving	Trent Riley	1 reception, 50 yards, TD
Idaho State	Passing	Michael Sanders	20/39, 177 yards, 2 TD, 2 INT
Idaho State	Rushing	Xavier Finney	23 rushes, 87 yards
Idaho State	Receiving	Josh Cook	4 receptions, 75 yards, TD

=== Western Oregon ===
Western Oregon Wolves at No. 17 Portland State Vikings – Game summary

Quarter	1	2	3	4	Total
Wolves	0	0	0	0	0
No. 17 Vikings	0	17	7	7	31

at Providence Park, Portland, Oregon

- Date: September 26
- Game time: 2:05 p.m. PDT
- Game weather: Sunny and warm, 72 °F (22 °C)
- Game attendance: 5,017
- Referee: Jeff Rink
- TV: WBS
- Box score, Recap

Game information
First quarter
- No scoring plays

Second quarter

- PRST – Alex Kuresa 2-yard run (Jonathan Gonzales kick), 9:51. Vikings 7–0. Drive: 7 plays, 60 yards, 2:59.
- PRST – Josh Kraght 25-yard run (Jonathan Gonzales kick), 5:52. Vikings 14–0. Drive: 6 plays, 43 yards, 1:51.
- PRST – Jonathan Gonzales 24-yard field goal, 2:14. Vikings 17–0. Drive: 6 plays, 12 yards, 1:58.

Third quarter

- PRST – Nate Tago 1-yard run (Jonathan Gonzales kick), 3:44. Vikings 24–0. Drive: 9 plays, 60 yards, 3:42.

Fourth quarter

- PRST – Steven Long 22-yard run (Jonathan Gonzales kick), 5:47. Vikings 31–0. Drive: 4 plays, 35 yards, 1:50.

Statistics	WES	PRST
First downs	0	18
Total yards	224	383
Rushing yards	27	256
Passing yards	197	127
Turnovers	3	1
Time of possession	26:18	33:42

Team	Category	Player	Statistics
Western Oregon	Passing	Trey Shimabukuro	18/35, 182 yards, 2 INT
Western Oregon	Rushing	Joe Harris	10 rushes, 31 yards
Western Oregon	Receiving	Maurice McSwain	2 receptions, 52 yards
Portland State	Passing	Alex Kuresa	8/18, 127 yards
Portland State	Rushing	Nate Tago	15 rushes, 69 yards, TD
Portland State	Receiving	Darnell Adams	1 reception, 46 yards

=== North Dakota ===
North Dakota Fighting Hawks at No. 16 Portland State Vikings – Game summary

Quarter	1	2	3	4	Total
Fighting Hawks	3	3	10	3	19
No. 16 Vikings	7	3	7	0	17

at Hillsboro Stadium, Hillsboro, Oregon

- Date: October 3
- Game time: 2:05 p.m. PDT
- Game weather: Partly sunny, 65 °F (18 °C)
- Game attendance: 4,765
- Referee: Scott Root
- TV: WBS
- Box score, Recap

Game information
First quarter
- PRST – Paris Penn 76-yard pass from Alex Kuresa (Jonathan Gonzales kick), 14:41. Vikings 7–0. Drive: 1 play, 76 yards, 0:19.
- UND – Reid Taubenheim 23-yard field goal, 6:30. Vikings 7–3. Drive: 17 plays, 76 yards, 8:06.

Second quarter

- UND – Reid Taubenheim 37-yard field goal, 6:46. Vikings 7–6. Drive: 11 plays, 60 yards, 4:12.
- PRST – Jonathan Gonzales 19-yard field goal, 0:33. Vikings 10–6. Drive: 4 plays, 8 yards, 2:14.

Third quarter

- UND – Reid Taubenheim 41-yard field goal, 8:07. Vikings 10–9. Drive: 6 plays, 21 yards, 2:57.
- UND – Keaton Studsrud 32-yard run (Reid Taubenheim kick), 5:47. Fighting Hawks 16–10. Drive: 2 plays, 62 yards, 0:29.
- PRST – Nate Tago 1-yard run (Jonathan Gonzales kick), 1:48. Vikings 17–16. Drive: 2 plays, 1 yard, 0:46.

Fourth quarter

- UND – Reid Taubenheim 29-yard field goal, 12:53. Fighting Hawks 19–17. Drive: 9 plays, 63 yards, 3:55.

Statistics	UND	PRST
First downs	20	10
Total yards	396	247
Rushing yards	260	97
Passing yards	136	150
Turnovers	2	1
Time of possession	35:36	24:24

Team	Category	Player	Statistics
North Dakota	Passing	Keaton Studsrud	9/17, 136 yards, INT
North Dakota	Rushing	John Santiago	22 rushes, 111 yards
North Dakota	Receiving	Luke Mathewson	3 receptions, 51 yards
Portland State	Passing	Alex Kuresa	9/13, 142 yards, TD
Portland State	Rushing	Alex Kuresa	15 rushes, 55 yards
Portland State	Receiving	Paris Penn	4 receptions, 94 yards, TD

=== At North Texas ===
No. 25 Portland State Vikings at North Texas Mean Green – Game summary

Quarter	1	2	3	4	Total
No. 25 Vikings	14	31	14	7	66
Mean Green	0	0	0	7	7

at Apogee Stadium, Denton, Texas

- Date: October 10
- Game time: 2:00 p.m. PDT/4:00 p.m. CDT
- Game weather: Sunny, 81 °F (27 °C)
- Game attendance: 19,801
- Referee: S. LaMantia
- Box score, Recap

Game information
First quarter
- PRST – Darnell Adams 34-yard pass from Alex Kuresa (Jonathan Gonzales kick), 7:30. Vikings 7–0. Drive: 3 plays, 43 yards, 0:40.
- PRST – Nate Tago 15-yard run (Jonathan Gonzales kick), 2:50. Vikings 14–0. Drive: 8 plays, 87 yards, 3:38.

Second quarter

- PRST – Nate Tago 1-yard run (Jonathan Gonzales kick), 14:23. Vikings 21–0. Drive: 7 plays, 78 yards, 2:10.
- PRST – David Jones 70-yard run (Jonathan Gonzales kick), 13:16. Vikings 28–0. Drive: 2 plays, 70 yards, 0:19.
- PRST – Thomas Carter III 56-yard pass from Alex Kuresa (Jonanthan Gonzales kick), 8:06. Vikings 35–0. Drive: 3 plays, 85 yards, 1:36.
- PRST – David Jones 7-yard run (Jonathan Gonzales kick), 2:50. Vikings 42–0. Drive: 10 plays, 80 yards, 4:22.
- PRST – Jonathan Gonzales 46-yard field goal, 0:27. Vikings 45–0. Drive: 4 plays, 8 yards, 1:12.

Third quarter

- PRST – David Jones 60-yard pass from Alex Kuresa (Jonathan Gonzales kick), 14:13. Vikings 52–0. Drive: 2 plays, 69 yards, 0:47.
- PRST – Steven Long 5-yard run (Jonathan Gonzales kick), 1:21. Vikings 59–0. Drive: 7 plays, 73 yards, 4:59.

Fourth quarter

- PRST – Mitchell Thompson 68-yard run (Jonathan Gonzales kick), 12:27. Vikings 66–0. Drive: 4 plays, 77 yards, 2:23.
- UNT – Carlos Harris 9-yard pass from DaMarcus Smith (Jonathan Gonzales kick), 1:02. Vikings 66–7. Drive: 12 plays, 81 yards, 3:28.

Statistics	PRST	UNT
First downs	27	13
Total yards	670	198
Rushing yards	368	76
Passing yards	302	122
Turnovers	0	1
Time of possession	33:37	26:23

Team	Category	Player	Statistics
Portland State	Passing	Alex Kuresa	11/19, 269 yards, 3 TD
Portland State	Rushing	David Jones	9 rushes, 134 yards, 2 TD
Portland State	Receiving	Darnell Adams	4 receptions, 100 yards, TD
North Texas	Passing	Andrew McNulty	10/25, 57 yards
North Texas	Rushing	Jeff Wilson	9 rushes, 49 yards
North Texas	Receiving	Carlos Harris	9 receptions, 57 yards, TD

=== No. 16 Montana State ===
No. 16 Montana State Bobcats at No. 17 Portland State Vikings – Game summary

Quarter	1	2	3	4	Total
No. 16 Bobcats	14	7	21	0	42
No. 17 Vikings	14	21	21	3	59

at Providence Park, Portland, Oregon

- Date: October 17
- Game time: 12:30 p.m. PDT
- Game weather: Cloudy, 65 °F (18 °C)
- Game attendance: 8,110
- Referee: Bret MacRae
- TV: RTNW
- Box score, Recap

Statistics	MTST	PRST
First downs	21	32
Total yards	440	682
Rushing yards	229	465
Passing yards	211	217
Turnovers	1	1
Time of possession	21:49	38:11

Team	Category	Player	Statistics
Montana State	Passing	Dakota Prukop	14/25, 211 yards, TD, INT
Montana State	Rushing	Dakota Prukop	14 rushes, 102 yards, 3 TD
Montana State	Receiving	Chad Newell	4 receptions, 70 yards
Portland State	Passing	Alex Kuresa	10/14, 217 yards, TD
Portland State	Rushing	David Jones	23 rushes, 285 yards, 3 TD
Portland State	Receiving	Trent Riley	1 reception, 44 yards

=== At Cal Poly ===
No.14 Portland State Vikings at Cal Poly Mustangs – Game summary

Quarter	1	2	3	4	Total
No. 14 Vikings	13	0	15	10	38
Mustangs	14	0	14	7	35

at Alex G. Spanos Stadium, San Luis Obispo, California

- Date: October 24
- Game time: 6:05 p.m. PDT
- Game weather: Cloudy, 68 °F (20 °C)
- Game attendance: 11,075
- Referee: Jim Crowley
- Box score, Recap

Statistics	PRST	CP
First downs	20	27
Total yards	386	536
Rushing yards	154	420
Passing yards	232	116
Turnovers	1	4
Time of possession	25:03	34:57

Team	Category	Player	Statistics
Portland State	Passing	Alex Kuresa	16/25, 232 yards, 2 TD, INT
Portland State	Rushing	Alex Kuresa	18 rushes, 101 yards, 2 TD
Portland State	Receiving	Trent Riley	5 receptions, 88 yards, TD
Cal Poly	Passing	Khaleel Jenkins	3/14, 59 yards
Cal Poly	Rushing	Kori Garcia	18 rushes, 131 yards
Cal Poly	Receiving	Kyle Lewis	1 reception, 57 yards, TD

=== No. 17 Montana ===
No. 17 Montana Grizzlies at No. 12 Portland State Vikings – Game summary

Quarter	1	2	3	4	Total
No. 17 Grizzlies	0	10	0	6	16
No. 12 Vikings	7	14	7	7	35

at Providence Park, Portland, Oregon

- Date: October 31
- Game time: 2:05 p.m. PDT
- Game weather: Heavy rain, 61 °F (16 °C)
- Game attendance: 11,045
- Referee: Kelly Holman
- TV: WBS
- Box score, Recap

Statistics	MONT	PRST
First downs	19	19
Total yards	294	460
Rushing yards	160	339
Passing yards	134	121
Turnovers	3	2
Time of possession	26:03	33:57

Team	Category	Player	Statistics
Montana	Passing	Makena Simis	15/36, 134 yards, 3 INT
Montana	Rushing	Makena Simis	22 rushes, 62 yards, TD
Montana	Receiving	Ben Romain Roberts	7 receptions, 37 yards
Portland State	Passing	Alex Kuresa	4/12, 121 yards, 2 TD, INT
Portland State	Rushing	David Jones	29 rushes, 165 yards, TD
Portland State	Receiving	Darnell Adams	1 reception, 46 yards, TD

=== At Northern Colorado ===
No. 10 Portland State Vikings at Northern Colorado Bears – Game summary

Quarter	1	2	3	4	Total
No. 10 Vikings	7	10	0	15	32
Bears	14	7	7	7	35

at Nottingham Field, Greeley, Colorado

- Date: November 7
- Game time: 11:00 a.m. PST/12:00 p.m. MST
- Game weather: Sunny, 44 °F (7 °C)
- Game attendance: 4,173
- Referee: Jeff Rink
- TV: WBS
- Box score, Recap

Statistics	PRST	UNCO
First downs	26	20
Total yards	493	483
Rushing yards	243	213
Passing yards	250	270
Turnovers	2	1
Time of possession	31:15	28:45

Team	Category	Player	Statistics
Portland State	Passing	Alex Kuresa	18/27, 250 yards, 2 TD, INT
Portland State	Rushing	David Jones	25 rushes, 110 yards
Portland State	Receiving	Darnell Adams	3 receptions, 94 yards, 2 TD
Northern Colorado	Passing	Jacob Knipp	18/30, 270 yards, TD, INT
Northern Colorado	Rushing	Trae Riek	25 rushes, 145 yards, TD
Northern Colorado	Receiving	Alex Wesley	3 receptions, 89 yards, TD

=== No. 18 Southern Utah ===
No. 18 Southern Utah Thunderbirds at No. 15 Portland State Vikings – Game summary

Quarter	1	2	3	4	Total
No. 18 Thunderbirds	10	0	7	6	23
No. 15 Vikings	7	10	0	7	24

at Providence Park, Portland, Oregon

- Date: November 14
- Game time: 2:05 p.m. PST
- Game weather: Cloudy and windy, 58 °F (14 °C)
- Game attendance: 6,122
- Referee: Bruce Bondi
- TV: WBS
- Box score, Recap

Statistics	SUU	PRST
First downs	30	15
Total yards	562	389
Rushing yards	178	186
Passing yards	384	203
Turnovers	3	0
Time of possession	27:27	32:33

Team	Category	Player	Statistics
Southern Utah	Passing	Ammon Olsen	28/47, 384 yards, 2 TD, 3 INT
Southern Utah	Rushing	Malik Brown	21 rushes, 93 yards
Southern Utah	Receiving	Mike Sharp	10 receptions, 197 yards, 2 TD
Portland State	Passing	Alex Kuresa	12/20, 196 yards, 2 TD
Portland State	Rushing	Nate Tago	15 rushes, 69 yards
Portland State	Receiving	Thomas Carter III	4 receptions, 88 yards, TD

=== At No. 18 Eastern Washington ===
No. 11 Portland State Vikings at No. 18 Eastern Washington Eagles – Game summary

Quarter	1	2	3	4	Total
No. 11 Vikings	13	0	14	7	34
No. 18 Eagles	10	7	0	14	31

at Roos Field, Cheney, Washington

- Date: November 21
- Game time: 2:05 p.m. PST
- Game weather: Clear, 37 °F (3 °C)
- Game attendance: 8,649
- Referee: Gregg Wilson
- TV: WBS
- Box score, Recap

Statistics	PRST	EWU
First downs	25	18
Total yards	397	390
Rushing yards	250	175
Passing yards	147	215
Turnovers	3	4
Time of possession	34:35	25:25

Team	Category	Player	Statistics
Portland State	Passing	Alex Kuresa	11/24, 142 yards, 2 TD, INT
Portland State	Rushing	David Jones	27 rushes, 152 yards, 2 TD
Portland State	Receiving	Chase Loftin	2 receptions, 41 yards
Eastern Washington	Passing	Reilly Hennessey	17/27, 215 yards, TD, 2 INT
Eastern Washington	Rushing	Jabari Wilson	14 rushes, 85 yards, TD
Eastern Washington	Receiving	Cooper Kupp	8 receptions, 136 yards, TD

== FCS Playoffs ==
=== No. 15 Northern Iowa (Second Round) ===
No. 15 Northern Iowa Panthers at No. 5 Portland State Vikings (FCS Playoffs Second Round) – Game summary

Quarter	1	2	3	4	Total
No. 15 Panthers	7	9	0	13	29
No. 5 Vikings	0	3	7	7	17

at Providence Park, Portland, Oregon

- Date: December 5
- Game time: 7:00 p.m. PST
- Game weather: Rainy, 46 °F (8 °C)
- Game attendance: 8,022
- Referee: Kevin Hassell
- TV: ESPN3
- Box score, Recap

Game information
First quarter
- UNI – Tyvis Smith 3-yard run (Michael Schmadeke kick), 5:47. Panthers 7–0. Drive: 11 plays, 66 yards, 4:45.

Second quarter

- PRST – Jonathan Gonzales 32-yard field goal, 13:18. Panthers 7–3. Drive: 15 plays, 47 yards, 4:49.
- UNI – Aaron Bailey 61-yard run (kick blocked), 2:38. Panthers 13–3. Drive: 4 plays, 80 yards, 1:46.
- UNI – Michael Schmadeke 44-yard field goal, 0:00. Panthers 16–3. Drive: 6 plays, 38 yards, 1:20.

Third quarter

- PRST – Chase Loftin 16-yard pass from Alex Kuresa (Jonathan Gonzales kick), 8:22. Panthers 16–10. Drive: 9 plays, 68 yards, 4:01.

Fourth quarter

- UNI – Aaron Bailey 69-yard run (Michael Schmadeke kick), 14:33. Panthers 23–10. Drive: 1 play, 69 yards, 0:12.
- PRST – David Jones 9-yard run (Jonathan Gonzales kick), 12:11. Panthers 23–17. Drive: 7 plays, 73 yards, 2:16.
- UNI – Tyvis Smith 59-yard run (pass failed), 8:02. Panthers 29–17. Drive: 1 play, 59 yards, 0:10.

Statistics	UNI	PRST
First downs	20	17
Total yards	432	285
Rushing yards	401	180
Passing yards	31	105
Turnovers	0	3
Time of possession	30:06	29:54

Team	Category	Player	Statistics
Western Oregon	Passing	Aaron Bailey	7/14, 34 yards
Western Oregon	Rushing	Tyvis Smith	21 rushes, 207 yards, 2 TD
Western Oregon	Receiving	Logan Cunningham	1 reception, 8 yards
Portland State	Passing	Alex Kuresa	8/22, 105 yards, TD, 2 INT
Portland State	Rushing	Nate Tago	15 rushes, 60 yards
Portland State	Receiving	Darnell Adams	3 receptions, 34 yards

== Ranking movements ==
Ranking movements Legend: ██ Increase in ranking ██ Decrease in ranking — = Not ranked RV = Received votes т = Tied with team above or below ( ) = First-place votes
	Week													
Poll	Pre	1	2	3	4	5	6	7	8	9	10	11	12	Final
STATS FCS	—	24	19	17	16	25	17	14	12	10 (1)	15	11	5	10
Coaches	—	RV	20	18	16	23	17	13	12	9–T	16	11	5	10

== Statistics ==
=== Scoring ===
Scores against non-conference opponents

	1	2	3	4	Total
Opponents	10	16	0	27	53
Portland State	14	51	38	35	138

Scores against the Big Sky Conference

	1	2	3	4	Total
Opponents	72	41	59	43	215
Portland State	85	65	71	52	273

Scores against all opponents

	1	2	3	4	Total
Opponents	82	57	59	70	268
Portland State	99	116	109	87	411
