= 2015 Weber State Wildcats football team =

American college football season

2015 Weber State Wildcats football
- Conference: Big Sky Conference
- Record: 6–5 (5–3 Big Sky)
- Head coach: Jay Hill (2nd season)
- Offensive coordinator: Steve Clark (2nd season)
- Home stadium: Stewart Stadium

2015 Big Sky Conference football standings
	Conf.			Overall
Team	W		L	W		L
No. 18 Southern Utah $^	7	–	1	8	–	4
No. 10 Portland State ^	6	–	2	9	–	3
No. 14 Montana ^	6	–	2	8	–	5
North Dakota	5	–	3	7	–	4
Northern Arizona	5	–	3	7	–	4
Eastern Washington	5	–	3	6	–	5
Weber State	5	–	3	6	–	5
Northern Colorado	3	–	5	6	–	5
Montana State	3	–	5	5	–	6
Cal Poly	3	–	5	4	–	7
UC Davis	2	–	6	2	–	9
Idaho State	1	–	7	2	–	9
Sacramento State	1	–	7	2	–	9
$ – Conference champion; ^ – FCS playoff participant; Rankings from STATS Poll

The 2015 Weber State Wildcats football team represented Weber State University in the 2015 NCAA Division I FCS football season. The Wildcats were led by second year head coach Jay Hill, played their games at Stewart Stadium and were members of the Big Sky Conference. They finished the season 6–5, 5–3 in Big Sky play to finish in a four way tie for fourth place. This was their first winning season in five years, and they led the Big Sky in total defense.

== Schedule ==
Date	Time	Opponent	Site	TV	Result	Attendance
September 5	7:30 pm	at Oregon State*	Reser Stadium; Corvallis, OR	P12N	L 7–26	35,160
September 12	1:30 pm	at No. 2 North Dakota State*	Fargodome; Fargo, ND	ESPN3	L 14–41	18,801
September 19	6:00 pm	Sacramento State*^{†}	Stewart Stadium; Ogden, UT	KJZZ	W 32–14	9,241
September 26	1:30 pm	at Northern Colorado	Nottingham Field; Greeley, CO	CET	W 38–17	4,218
October 2	6:00 pm	Southern Utah	Stewart Stadium; Ogden, UT		L 0–44	5,778
October 10	2:00 pm	at No. 12 Montana	Washington–Grizzly Stadium; Missoula, MT	CMM	W 24–21 ^{OT}	25,500
October 17	6:00 pm	North Dakota	Stewart Stadium; Ogden, UT	KJZZ	W 25–24	5,461
October 24	5:00 pm	at Northern Arizona	Walkup Skydome; Flagstaff, AZ	FCS	L 36–52	8,367
October 31	1:00 pm	at No. 5 Eastern Washington	Roos Field; Cheney, WA	RTUT	L 13–14	8,759
November 7	12:00 pm	UC Davis	Stewart Stadium; Ogden, UT	KJZZ	W 23–3	5,899
November 21	1:00 pm	Idaho State	Stewart Stadium; Ogden, UT	KJZZ	W 35–14	6,137
*Non-conference game; ^{†}Homecoming; Rankings from STATS Poll released prior to the game; All times are in Mountain time

Despite also being a member of the Big Sky Conference, the game with Sacramento State on September 19 is considered a non conference game.

== Game summaries ==
=== At Oregon State ===
	1	2	3	4	Total
Wildcats	0	0	7	0	7
Beavers	0	6	7	13	26

=== At North Dakota State ===
	1	2	3	4	Total
Wildcats	7	0	0	7	14
#2 Bison	7	21	3	10	41

=== Sacramento State ===
	1	2	3	4	Total
Hornets	0	0	7	7	14
Wildcats	9	6	3	14	32

=== At Northern Colorado ===
	1	2	3	4	Total
Wildcats	7	10	14	7	38
Bears	0	0	14	3	17

=== Southern Utah ===
	1	2	3	4	Total
Thunderbirds	7	10	14	13	44
Wildcats	0	0	0	0	0

=== At Montana ===
	1	2	3	4	OT	Total
Wildcats	7	14	0	0	3	24
#12 Grizzlies	14	0	0	7	0	21

=== North Dakota ===
	1	2	3	4	Total
North Dakota	7	10	0	7	24
Wildcats	3	0	7	15	25

=== At Northern Arizona ===
	1	2	3	4	Total
Wildcats	0	9	14	13	36
Lumberjacks	21	14	7	10	52

=== At Eastern Washington ===
	1	2	3	4	Total
Wildcats	10	3	0	0	13
#5 Eagles	0	7	7	0	14

=== UC Davis ===
	1	2	3	4	Total
Aggies	3	0	0	0	3
Wildcats	3	17	3	0	23

=== Idaho State ===
	1	2	3	4	Total
Bengals	0	0	7	7	14
Wildcats	7	7	14	7	35
