= 2015 Sacramento State Hornets football team =

American college football season

2015 Sacramento State Hornets football
- Conference: Big Sky Conference
- Record: 2–9 (1–7 Big Sky)
- Head coach: Jody Sears (2nd season)
- Offensive coordinator: Paul Peterson (4th season)
- Home stadium: Hornet Stadium

2015 Big Sky Conference football standings
	Conf.			Overall
Team	W		L	W		L
No. 18 Southern Utah $^	7	–	1	8	–	4
No. 10 Portland State ^	6	–	2	9	–	3
No. 14 Montana ^	6	–	2	8	–	5
North Dakota	5	–	3	7	–	4
Northern Arizona	5	–	3	7	–	4
Eastern Washington	5	–	3	6	–	5
Weber State	5	–	3	6	–	5
Northern Colorado	3	–	5	6	–	5
Montana State	3	–	5	5	–	6
Cal Poly	3	–	5	4	–	7
UC Davis	2	–	6	2	–	9
Idaho State	1	–	7	2	–	9
Sacramento State	1	–	7	2	–	9
$ – Conference champion; ^ – FCS playoff participant; Rankings from STATS Poll

The 2015 Sacramento State Hornets football team represented California State University, Sacramento as a member of the Big Sky Conference during the 2015 NCAA Division I FCS football season. Led by second-year head coach Jody Sears, Sacramento State compiled an overall record of 2–9 with a mark of 1–7 in conference play, tying for 12th place in the Big Sky. The Hornets played home games at Hornet Stadium in Sacramento, California.

== Schedule ==
Date	Time	Opponent	Site	TV	Result	Attendance
September 5	6:05 pm	Eastern Oregon*	Hornet Stadium; Sacramento, CA	WBS	W 41–20	11,735
September 12	11:00 am	at Washington*	Husky Stadium; Seattle, WA	P12N	L 0–49	55,010
September 19	5:05 pm	at Weber State*	Stewart Stadium; Ogden, UT	WBS	L 14–32	9,241
September 26	6:05 pm	No. 11 Eastern Washington	Hornet Stadium; Sacramento, CA	WBS	L 20–28	7,211
October 3	6:05 pm	Northern Colorado	Hornet Stadium; Sacramento, CA	WBS	L 20–27	6,079
October 10	4:00 pm	at No. 18 Montana State	Bobcat Stadium; Bozeman, MT	CMM	L 13–35	19,407
October 17	5:05 pm	at Southern Utah	Eccles Coliseum; Cedar City, UT	WBS	L 0–44	3,607
October 24	6:05 pm	Idaho State^{†}	Hornet Stadium; Sacramento, CA		W 38–13	9,135
November 7	6:05 pm	at Cal Poly	Alex G. Spanos Stadium; San Luis Obispo, CA	WBS	L 14–36	6,543
November 14	1:00 pm	at Northern Arizona	Walkup Skydome; Flagstaff, AZ	WBS	L 35–49	5,937
November 21	2:30 pm	UC Davis	Hornet Stadium; Sacramento, CA (Causeway Classic)	CSNCA	L 21–35	10,237
*Non-conference game; ^{†}Homecoming; Rankings from STATS Poll released prior to the game; All times are in Pacific time

Despite Weber State also being a member of the Big Sky Conference, the September 19 game against Sacramento State was considered a non-conference game.

== Game summaries ==
=== Eastern Oregon ===
	1	2	3	4	Total
Mountaineers	0	0	6	14	20
Hornets	14	17	10	0	41

=== At Washington ===
	1	2	3	4	Total
Hornets	0	0	0	0	0
Huskies	0	28	21	0	49

=== At Weber State ===
	1	2	3	4	Total
Hornets	0	0	7	7	14
Wildcats	9	6	3	14	32

=== Eastern Washington ===
	1	2	3	4	Total
#11 Eagles	7	0	21	0	28
Hornets	10	10	0	0	20

=== Northern Colorado ===
	1	2	3	4	Total
Bears	7	3	10	7	27
Hornets	7	3	0	10	20

=== At Montana State ===
	1	2	3	4	Total
Hornets	7	3	3	0	13
#18 Bobcats	14	7	7	7	35

=== At Southern Utah ===
	1	2	3	4	Total
Hornets	0	0	0	0	0
Thunderbirds	21	0	16	7	44

=== Idaho State ===
	1	2	3	4	Total
Bengals	7	3	3	0	13
Hornets	0	17	21	0	38

=== At Cal Poly ===
	1	2	3	4	Total
Hornets	0	0	7	7	14
Mustangs	7	7	12	10	36

=== At Northern Arizona ===
	1	2	3	4	Total
Hornets	14	0	0	21	35
Lumberjacks	14	21	7	7	49

=== UC Davis ===
	1	2	3	4	Total
Aggies	7	14	7	7	35
Hornets	0	0	14	7	21
