= 2015 Northern Colorado Bears football team =

American college football season

2015 Northern Colorado Bears football
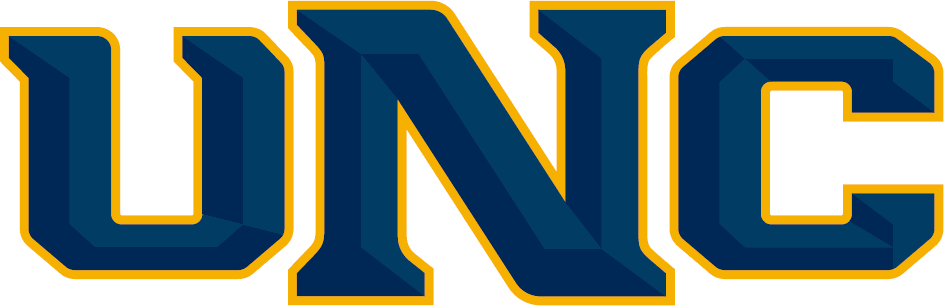
- Conference: Big Sky Conference
- Record: 6–5 (3–5 Big Sky)
- Head coach: Earnest Collins Jr. (5th season)
- Offensive coordinator: Jon Boyer (4th season)
- Offensive scheme: Spread
- Defensive coordinator: Larry Kerr (2nd season)
- Base defense: 4–3
- Home stadium: Nottingham Field

2015 Big Sky Conference football standings
	Conf.			Overall
Team	W		L	W		L
No. 18 Southern Utah $^	7	–	1	8	–	4
No. 10 Portland State ^	6	–	2	9	–	3
No. 14 Montana ^	6	–	2	8	–	5
North Dakota	5	–	3	7	–	4
Northern Arizona	5	–	3	7	–	4
Eastern Washington	5	–	3	6	–	5
Weber State	5	–	3	6	–	5
Northern Colorado	3	–	5	6	–	5
Montana State	3	–	5	5	–	6
Cal Poly	3	–	5	4	–	7
UC Davis	2	–	6	2	–	9
Idaho State	1	–	7	2	–	9
Sacramento State	1	–	7	2	–	9
$ – Conference champion; ^ – FCS playoff participant; Rankings from STATS Poll

The 2015 Northern Colorado Bears football team represented the University of Northern Colorado in the 2015 NCAA Division I FCS football season. They were led by fifth-year head coach Earnest Collins Jr. and played their home games at Nottingham Field. They were a member of the Big Sky Conference. They finished the season 6–5, 3–5 in Big Sky play to finish in a three way tie for eighth place.

== Schedule ==
Date	Time	Opponent	Site	TV	Result	Attendance
September 5	1:35 pm	Western State (CO)*	Nottingham Field; Greeley, CO	CET	W 42–34	4,375
September 12	6:00 pm	at Houston Baptist*	Husky Stadium; Houston, TX	RTSW*	W 34–10	3,185
September 19	6:00 pm	at Southern Utah	Eccles Coliseum; Cedar City, UT	WBS	L 3–30	5,103
September 26	1:35 pm	Weber State	Nottingham Field; Greeley, CO	CET	L 17–38	4,218
October 3	5:05 pm	at Sacramento State	Hornet Stadium; Sacramento, CA	WBS	W 27–20	6,079
October 17	1:35 pm	UC Davis^{†}	Nottingham Field; Greeley, CO	CET	W 56–27	4,525
October 24	1:35 pm	No. 7 Eastern Washington	Nottingham Field; Greeley, CO		L 41–43	4,254
October 31	1:00 pm	at Northern Arizona	Walkup Skydome; Flagstaff, AZ	FCS	L 21–63	4,091
November 7	12:00 pm	No. 10 Portland State	Nottingham Field; Greeley, CO	WBS	W 35–32	4,173
November 14	12:00 pm	at North Dakota	Alerus Center; Grand Forks, ND	WBS	L 14–45	6,996
November 21	12:00 pm	Abilene Christian*	Nottingham Field; Greeley, CO	WBS	W 40–36	3,387
*Non-conference game; ^{†}Homecoming; Rankings from STATS Poll released prior to the game; All times are in Mountain time

- Source: Schedule

- - Game will be televised on tape delay.

== Game summaries ==
=== Western State (CO) ===
	1	2	3	4	Total
Mountaineers	7	13	7	7	34
Bears	14	7	14	7	42

=== At Houston Baptist ===
	1	2	3	4	Total
Bears	6	7	14	7	34
Huskies	3	0	0	7	10

=== At Southern Utah ===
	1	2	3	4	Total
Bears	3	0	0	0	3
Thunderbirds	17	6	7	0	30

=== Weber State ===
	1	2	3	4	Total
Wildcats	7	10	14	7	38
Bears	0	0	14	3	17

=== At Sacramento State ===
	1	2	3	4	Total
Bears	7	3	10	7	27
Hornets	7	3	0	10	20

=== UC Davis ===
	1	2	3	4	Total
Aggies	0	3	10	14	27
Bears	21	21	14	0	56

=== Eastern Washington ===
	1	2	3	4	Total
#7 Eagles	6	13	7	17	43
Bears	7	7	14	13	41

=== At Northern Arizona ===
	1	2	3	4	Total
Bears	7	0	0	14	21
Lumberjacks	28	14	21	0	63

=== Portland State ===
	1	2	3	4	Total
#10 Vikings	7	10	0	15	32
Bears	14	7	7	7	35

=== At North Dakota ===
	1	2	3	4	Total
Bears	0	0	0	14	14
North Dakota	7	28	10	0	45

=== Abilene Christian ===
	1	2	3	4	Total
Wildcats	14	7	7	8	36
Bears	6	21	3	10	40
