= 2015 Montana State Bobcats football team =

American college football season

2015 Montana State Bobcats football
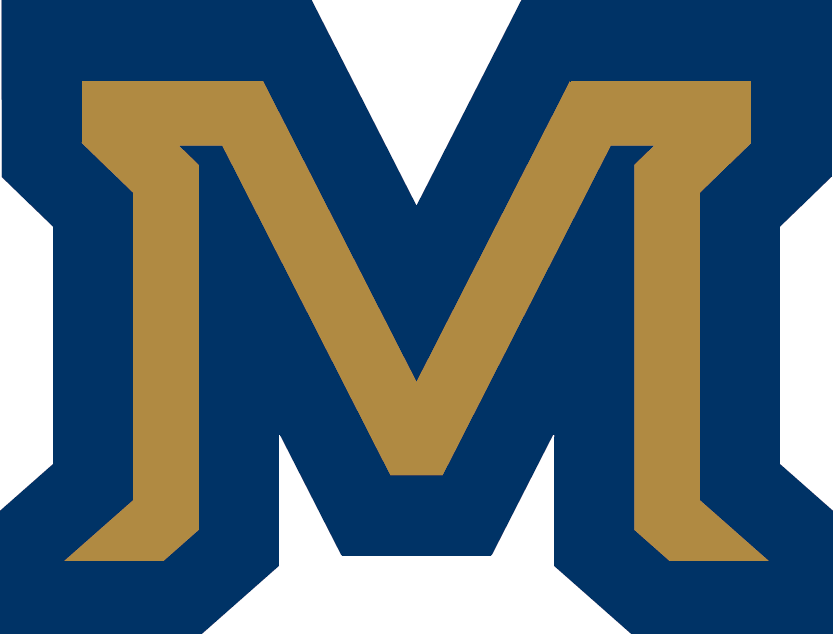
- Conference: Big Sky Conference
- Record: 5–6 (3–5 Big Sky)
- Head coach: Rob Ash (9th season)
- Offensive coordinator: Tim Cramsey (3rd season)
- Co-defensive coordinators: Jamie Marshall (9th season); Kane Ioane (1st season)
- Home stadium: Bobcat Stadium

2015 Big Sky Conference football standings
| | Conf. | | | Overall |
| Team | W | | L | W | | L |
|---|---|---|---|---|---|---|
| No. 18 Southern Utah $^ | 7 | – | 1 | 8 | – | 4 |
| No. 10 Portland State ^ | 6 | – | 2 | 9 | – | 3 |
| No. 14 Montana ^ | 6 | – | 2 | 8 | – | 5 |
| North Dakota | 5 | – | 3 | 7 | – | 4 |
| Northern Arizona | 5 | – | 3 | 7 | – | 4 |
| Eastern Washington | 5 | – | 3 | 6 | – | 5 |
| Weber State | 5 | – | 3 | 6 | – | 5 |
| Northern Colorado | 3 | – | 5 | 6 | – | 5 |
| Montana State | 3 | – | 5 | 5 | – | 6 |
| Cal Poly | 3 | – | 5 | 4 | – | 7 |
| UC Davis | 2 | – | 6 | 2 | – | 9 |
| Idaho State | 1 | – | 7 | 2 | – | 9 |
| Sacramento State | 1 | – | 7 | 2 | – | 9 |
$ – Conference champion; ^ – FCS playoff participant; Rankings from STATS Poll

The 2015 Montana State Bobcats football team represented Montana State University as a member of the Big Sky Conference during the 2015 NCAA Division I FCS football season. Led by Rob Ash in his ninth and final season as head coach, Montana State compiled an overall record of 5–6 with a mark of 3–5 in conference play, placing in a three-way tie for eighth place in the Big Sky. The Bobcats played their home games at Bobcat Stadium in Bozeman, Montana.

On November 24, Ash was fired. He finished his tenure as Montana State with a nine-year record of 70–38.

== Schedule ==
| Date | Time | Opponent | Rank | Site | TV | Result | Attendance |
|---|---|---|---|---|---|---|---|
| September 3 | 7:05 pm | Fort Lewis* | No. 11 | Bobcat Stadium; Bozeman, MT | CMM | W 45–14 | 19,367 |
| September 19 | 2:05 pm | at No. 14 Eastern Washington* | No. 11 | Roos Field; Cheney, WA | RTNW | L 50–55 | 10,912 |
| September 26 | 1:35 pm | No. 20 Cal Poly^{†} | No. 15 | Bobcat Stadium; Bozeman, MT | CMM | W 45–28 | 19,707 |
| October 3 | 5:05 pm | at Northern Arizona | No. 11 | Walkup Skydome; Flagstaff, AZ | CMM | L 41–49 | 9,431 |
| October 10 | 5:05 pm | Sacramento State | No. 18 | Bobcat Stadium; Bozeman, MT | RTNW | W 35–13 | 19,407 |
| October 17 | 1:35 pm | at No. 17 Portland State | No. 16 | Providence Park; Portland, OR | RTNW | L 42–59 | 8,110 |
| October 24 | 2:35 pm | East Tennessee State* | No. 21 | Bobcat Stadium; Bozeman, MT | CMM | W 63–7 | 18,617 |
| October 31 | 12:00 pm | at North Dakota | No. 19 | Alerus Center; Grand Forks, ND | CMM | L 38–44 | 7,090 |
| November 7 | 1:35 pm | No. 20 Southern Utah | | Bobcat Stadium; Bozeman, MT | RTNW | L 23–34 | 17,427 |
| November 14 | 1:35 pm | at Idaho State | | Holt Arena; Pocatello, ID | CMM | W 44–20 | 6,498 |
| November 21 | 12:05 pm | No. 17 Montana | | Bobcat Stadium; Bozeman, MT (rivalry) | RTNW | L 35–54 | 20,507 |
*Non-conference game; ^{†}Homecoming; Rankings from STATS Poll released prior to the game; All times are in Mountain time

The game with Eastern Washington on September 19 was not counted as a conference game even though Eastern Washington was also a member of the Big Sky Conference.

== Coaching staff ==
| Name | Position |
|---|---|
| Rob Ash | Head coach |
| Jamie Marshall | Assistant head coach/co-defensive coordinator/secondary |
| Tim Cramsey | Offensive coordinator/quarterbacks |
| Kane Ioane | Co-defensive coordinator/linebackers |
| Bo Beck | Defensive Line/recruiting coordinator |
| Daniel Da Prato | Tight Ends/special teams coordinator |
| Michael Rider | Cornerbacks |
| Michael Pitre | Running backs |
| Garrett Becker | Video coordinator |
| Jason Eck | Offensive Line |
| Jody Owens | Linebackers Assistant |

== Game summaries ==
=== Fort Lewis ===
| | 1 | 2 | 3 | 4 | Total |
|---|---|---|---|---|---|
| Skyhawks | 0 | 0 | 7 | 7 | 14 |
| #11 Bobcats | 0 | 14 | 14 | 17 | 45 |

=== At Eastern Washington ===
| | 1 | 2 | 3 | 4 | Total |
|---|---|---|---|---|---|
| #11 Bobcats | 7 | 10 | 14 | 19 | 50 |
| #14 Eagles | 21 | 13 | 14 | 7 | 55 |

=== Cal Poly ===
| | 1 | 2 | 3 | 4 | Total |
|---|---|---|---|---|---|
| #20 Mustangs | 7 | 14 | 0 | 7 | 28 |
| #15 Bobcats | 21 | 10 | 14 | 0 | 45 |

=== At Northern Arizona ===
| | 1 | 2 | 3 | 4 | Total |
|---|---|---|---|---|---|
| #11 Bobcats | 7 | 7 | 6 | 21 | 41 |
| Lumberjacks | 14 | 14 | 14 | 7 | 49 |

=== Sacramento State ===
| | 1 | 2 | 3 | 4 | Total |
|---|---|---|---|---|---|
| Hornets | 7 | 3 | 3 | 0 | 13 |
| #18 Bobcats | 14 | 7 | 7 | 7 | 35 |

=== At Portland State ===
| | 1 | 2 | 3 | 4 | Total |
|---|---|---|---|---|---|
| #16 Bobcats | 14 | 7 | 21 | 0 | 42 |
| #17 Vikings | 14 | 21 | 21 | 3 | 59 |

=== East Tennessee State ===
| | 1 | 2 | 3 | 4 | Total |
|---|---|---|---|---|---|
| Buccaneers | 0 | 0 | 0 | 7 | 7 |
| #21 Bobcats | 13 | 22 | 14 | 14 | 63 |

=== At North Dakota ===
| | 1 | 2 | 3 | 4 | Total |
|---|---|---|---|---|---|
| #19 Bobcats | 7 | 17 | 7 | 7 | 38 |
| North Dakota | 21 | 10 | 7 | 6 | 44 |

=== Southern Utah ===
| | 1 | 2 | 3 | 4 | Total |
|---|---|---|---|---|---|
| #20 Thunderbirds | 0 | 7 | 19 | 8 | 34 |
| Bobcats | 7 | 3 | 7 | 6 | 23 |

=== At Idaho State ===
| | 1 | 2 | 3 | 4 | Total |
|---|---|---|---|---|---|
| Bobcats | 17 | 10 | 14 | 3 | 44 |
| Bengals | 0 | 0 | 14 | 6 | 20 |

=== Montana ===
| | 1 | 2 | 3 | 4 | Total |
|---|---|---|---|---|---|
| #17 Grizzlies | 17 | 20 | 7 | 10 | 54 |
| Bobcats | 7 | 7 | 8 | 13 | 35 |

== Ranking movements ==
Ranking movements Legend: ██ Increase in ranking ██ Decrease in ranking — = Not ranked RV = Received votes
| | Week | | | | | | | | | | | | | |
| Poll | Pre | 1 | 2 | 3 | 4 | 5 | 6 | 7 | 8 | 9 | 10 | 11 | 12 | Final |
|---|---|---|---|---|---|---|---|---|---|---|---|---|---|---|
| STATS FCS | 11 | 11 | 11 | 15 | 11 | 18 | 16 | 21 | 19 | RV | RV | RV | RV | — |
| Coaches | 11 | 9 | 9 | 13 | 11 | 19 | 16 | 19 | 18 | 24 | RV | — | — | — |
