= 2015 Southern Utah Thunderbirds football team =

American college football season

2015 Southern Utah Thunderbirds football

Big Sky champion

FCS Playoffs First Round, L 39–42 vs. Sam Houston State
- Conference: Big Sky Conference

Ranking
- STATS: No. 18
- FCS Coaches: No. 18
- Record: 8–4 (7–1 Big Sky)
- Head coach: Ed Lamb (8th season)
- Offensive coordinator: Gary Crowton (2nd season)
- Defensive coordinator: Demario Warren (2nd season)
- Home stadium: Eccles Coliseum

2015 Big Sky Conference football standings
	Conf.			Overall
Team	W		L	W		L
No. 18 Southern Utah $^	7	–	1	8	–	4
No. 10 Portland State ^	6	–	2	9	–	3
No. 14 Montana ^	6	–	2	8	–	5
North Dakota	5	–	3	7	–	4
Northern Arizona	5	–	3	7	–	4
Eastern Washington	5	–	3	6	–	5
Weber State	5	–	3	6	–	5
Northern Colorado	3	–	5	6	–	5
Montana State	3	–	5	5	–	6
Cal Poly	3	–	5	4	–	7
UC Davis	2	–	6	2	–	9
Idaho State	1	–	7	2	–	9
Sacramento State	1	–	7	2	–	9
$ – Conference champion; ^ – FCS playoff participant; Rankings from STATS Poll

The 2015 Southern Utah Thunderbirds football team represented Southern Utah University in the 2015 NCAA Division I FCS football season. They were led by eighth-year head coach Ed Lamb and played their home games at Eccles Coliseum. This was their fourth year as a member of the Big Sky Conference. They finished the season 8–4, 7–1 in Big Sky play to be crowned Big Sky champion for the first time. They received the Big Sky's automatic bid to the FCS playoffs where they lost in the first round to Sam Houston State.

On December 26, Lamb resigned to become the special teams coordinator and tight ends coach at BYU. He finished at Southern Utah with an eight year record of 45–47.

== Schedule ==
Date	Time	Opponent	Rank	Site	TV	Result	Attendance
September 3	7:00 pm	at Utah State*		Maverik Stadium; Logan, UT		L 9–12	21,209
September 12	5:00 pm	at No. 9 South Dakota State*		Coughlin–Alumni Stadium; Brookings, SD	ESPN3	L 10–55	13,423
September 19	6:00 pm	Northern Colorado		Eccles Coliseum; Cedar City, UT	WBS	W 30–3	5,103
September 26	6:00 pm	Brevard*^{†}		Eccles Coliseum; Cedar City, UT	WBS	W 55–7	5,789
October 2	6:00 pm	at Weber State		Stewart Stadium; Ogden, UT	WBS	W 44–0	5,778
October 17	6:00 pm	Sacramento State		Eccles Coliseum; Cedar City, UT	WBS	W 44–0	3,607
October 24	5:00 pm	at UC Davis		Aggie Stadium; Davis, CA		W 34–6	4,640
October 31	3:00 pm	Cal Poly		Eccles Coliseum; Cedar City, UT	WBS	W 54–37	4,506
November 7	1:00 pm	at Montana State	No. 20	Bobcat Stadium; Bozeman, MT	RTUT	W 34–23	17,427
November 14	3:05 pm	at No. 15 Portland State	No. 18	Providence Park; Portland, OR	WBS	L 23–24	6,122
November 21	3:00 pm	No. 24 Northern Arizona	No. 20	Eccles Coliseum; Cedar City, UT (Grand Canyon Rivalry)	WBS	W 49–41	9,022
November 28	3:00 pm	at No. 6 Sam Houston State*	No. 17	Bowers Stadium; Huntsville, TX (NCAA Division I First Round)	ESPN3	L 39–42	3,098
*Non-conference game; ^{†}Homecoming; Rankings from STATS Poll released prior to the game; All times are in Mountain time

== Game summaries ==
=== At Utah State ===
	1	2	3	4	Total
Thunderbirds	6	3	0	0	9
Aggies	5	0	0	7	12

=== At South Dakota State ===
	1	2	3	4	Total
Thunderbirds	7	0	0	3	10
#9 Jackrabbits	3	24	7	21	55

=== Northern Colorado ===
	1	2	3	4	Total
Bears	3	0	0	0	3
Thunderbirds	17	6	7	0	30

=== Brevard ===
	1	2	3	4	Total
Tornados	0	0	0	7	7
Thunderbirds	7	20	14	14	55

=== At Weber State ===
	1	2	3	4	Total
Thunderbirds	7	10	14	13	44
Wildcats	0	0	0	0	0

=== Sacramento State ===
	1	2	3	4	Total
Hornets	0	0	0	0	0
Thunderbirds	21	0	16	7	44

=== At UC Davis ===
	1	2	3	4	Total
Thunderbirds	0	7	13	14	34
Aggies	3	3	0	0	6

=== Cal Poly ===
	1	2	3	4	Total
Mustangs	3	21	7	6	37
Thunderbirds	10	23	7	14	54

=== At Montana State ===
	1	2	3	4	Total
#20 Thunderbirds	0	7	19	8	34
Bobcats	7	3	7	6	23

=== At Portland State ===
	1	2	3	4	Total
#18 Thunderbirds	10	0	7	6	23
#15 Vikings	7	10	0	7	24

=== Northern Arizona ===
	1	2	3	4	Total
#24 Lumberjacks	3	21	7	10	41
#20 Thunderbirds	7	7	21	14	49

== FCS Playoffs ==
=== First Round–at Sam Houston State ===
	1	2	3	4	Total
#17 Thunderbirds	6	26	7	0	39
#6 Bearkats	16	10	7	9	42

== Ranking movements ==
Ranking movements Legend: ██ Increase in ranking ██ Decrease in ranking — = Not ranked RV = Received votes
	Week													
Poll	Pre	1	2	3	4	5	6	7	8	9	10	11	12	Final
STATS FCS	—	—	—	—	—	—	RV	RV	RV	20	18	20	17	18
Coaches	—	—	—	—	—	—	—	RV	24	18	15	18	16	18
