= 2015 Cal Poly Mustangs football team =

American college football season

2015 Cal Poly Mustangs football
- Conference: Big Sky Conference
- Record: 4–7 (3–5 Big Sky)
- Head coach: Tim Walsh (7th season)
- Offensive coordinator: Saga Tuitele (7th season)
- Offensive scheme: Spread triple-option
- Defensive coordinator: Josh Brown (4th season)
- Base defense: Multiple 4–3, 3–4
- Home stadium: Alex G. Spanos Stadium

2015 Big Sky Conference football standings
	Conf.			Overall
Team	W		L	W		L
No. 18 Southern Utah $^	7	–	1	8	–	4
No. 10 Portland State ^	6	–	2	9	–	3
No. 14 Montana ^	6	–	2	8	–	5
North Dakota	5	–	3	7	–	4
Northern Arizona	5	–	3	7	–	4
Eastern Washington	5	–	3	6	–	5
Weber State	5	–	3	6	–	5
Northern Colorado	3	–	5	6	–	5
Montana State	3	–	5	5	–	6
Cal Poly	3	–	5	4	–	7
UC Davis	2	–	6	2	–	9
Idaho State	1	–	7	2	–	9
Sacramento State	1	–	7	2	–	9
$ – Conference champion; ^ – FCS playoff participant; Rankings from STATS Poll

The 2015 Cal Poly Mustangs football team represented California Polytechnic State University, San Luis Obispo as member of the Big Sky Conference during the 2015 NCAA Division I FCS football season. Led by seventh-year head coach Tim Walsh, Cal Poly compiled an overall record of 4–7 with a mark of 3–5 in conference play, placing in a three-way tie for eighth in the Big Sky. The Mustangs played home games at Mustang Stadium in San Luis Obispo, California.

== Schedule ==
Date	Time	Opponent	Rank	Site	TV	Result	Attendance
September 5	6:00 pm	at No. 13 Montana*		Washington–Grizzly Stadium; Missoula, MT	KWCA	W 20–19	26,065
September 12	8:00 pm	at Arizona State*	No. 18	Sun Devil Stadium; Tempe, AZ	P12N	L 21–35	46,500
September 19	7:30 pm	No. 9 Northern Iowa*	No. 17	Alex G. Spanos Stadium; San Luis Obispo, CA	ASN	L 20–34	11,075
September 26	12:35 pm	at No. 15 Montana State	No. 20	Bobcat Stadium; Bozeman, MT	KWCA	L 28–45	19,707
October 3	6:05 pm	Idaho State		Alex G. Spanos Stadium; San Luis Obispo, CA	WBS	W 58–26	7,523
October 10	1:05 pm	at No. 7 Eastern Washington		Roos Field; Cheney, WA	WBS	L 41–42 ^{OT}	10,352
October 24	6:05 pm	No. 14 Portland State		Alex G. Spanos Stadium; San Luis Obispo, CA	WBS	L 35–38	11,075
October 31	2:00 pm	at Southern Utah		Eccles Coliseum; Cedar City, UT	WBS	L 37–54	4,506
November 7	6:05 pm	Sacramento State^{†}		Alex G. Spanos Stadium; San Luis Obispo, CA	WBS	W 36–14	6,543
November 14	2:00 pm	at UC Davis		Aggie Stadium; Davis, CA (Battle for the Golden Horseshoe)	WBS	W 55–38	6,197
November 21	6:05 pm	North Dakota		Alex G. Spanos Stadium; San Luis Obispo, CA	WBS	L 21–45	5,746
*Non-conference game; ^{†}Homecoming; Rankings from STATS Poll released prior to the game; All times are in Pacific time

The game with Montana, fellow Big Sky Conference member, on September 5 was considered a non-conference game and had no effect on the Big Sky standings.

== Rankings ==
Ranking movements Legend: ██ Increase in ranking ██ Decrease in ranking — = Not ranked RV = Received votes
	Week													
Poll	Pre	1	2	3	4	5	6	7	8	9	10	11	12	Final
STATS FCS	RV	18	17	20	RV	RV	RV	RV	RV	—	—	—	—	—
Coaches	RV	20	18	22	RV	RV	RV	RV	—	—	—	RV	—	—

== Game summaries ==
=== At Montana ===
	1	2	3	4	Total
Mustangs	7	7	3	3	20
#13 Grizzlies	7	7	0	5	19

=== At Arizona State ===
	1	2	3	4	Total
#18 Mustangs	0	14	7	0	21
Sun Devils	7	14	0	14	35

=== Northern Iowa ===
	1	2	3	4	Total
#9 Panthers	21	7	0	6	34
#17 Mustangs	0	7	0	13	20

=== At Montana State ===
	1	2	3	4	Total
#20 Mustangs	7	14	0	7	28
#15 Bobcats	21	10	14	0	45

=== Idaho State ===
	1	2	3	4	Total
Bengals	0	20	6	0	26
Mustangs	14	14	24	6	58

=== At Eastern Washington ===
	1	2	3	4	OT	Total
Mustangs	7	14	7	7	6	41
#7 Eagles	6	7	0	22	7	42

=== Portland State ===
	1	2	3	4	Total
#14 Vikings	13	0	15	10	38
Mustangs	14	0	14	7	35

=== At Southern Utah ===
	1	2	3	4	Total
Mustangs	3	21	7	6	37
Thunderbirds	10	23	7	14	54

=== Sacramento State ===
	1	2	3	4	Total
Hornets	0	0	7	7	14
Mustangs	7	7	12	10	36

=== At UC Davis ===
	1	2	3	4	Total
Mustangs	21	13	7	14	55
Aggies	14	0	17	7	38

=== North Dakota ===
	1	2	3	4	Total
Fighting Hawks	7	21	7	10	45
Mustangs	0	0	14	7	21

== Coaching staff ==
Name	Position	Years at Cal Poly
Tim Walsh	Head coach	7
Saga Tuitele	Offensive coordinator, offensive line	7
Aristotle Thompson	Running backs, fullbacks, recruiting coordinator	7
Jim Craft	Wide receivers, special teams coordinator	3
Juston Wood	Quarterbacks	7
Josh Brown	Defensive coordinator, linebackers	6
Eti Ena	Defensive line	3
Jacob Yoro	Defensive backs	1
Dorian Keller	Tight ends	1
Allen Brown	Safeties	1
James Emma	Linebackers	1
Joe Harper	Director of football operations, quality control coach	19
Kenneth McMillan	Student assistant	3
Sebastian Ramirez	Student assistant	2
