= 2015 Northern Arizona Lumberjacks football team =

American college football season

2015 Northern Arizona Lumberjacks football
- Conference: Big Sky Conference
- Record: 7–4 (5–3 Big Sky)
- Head coach: Jerome Souers (18th season)
- Offensive coordinator: Tim Plough (1st season)
- Defensive coordinator: Andy Thompson (7th season)
- Home stadium: Walkup Skydome

2015 Big Sky Conference football standings
	Conf.			Overall
Team	W		L	W		L
No. 18 Southern Utah $^	7	–	1	8	–	4
No. 10 Portland State ^	6	–	2	9	–	3
No. 14 Montana ^	6	–	2	8	–	5
North Dakota	5	–	3	7	–	4
Northern Arizona	5	–	3	7	–	4
Eastern Washington	5	–	3	6	–	5
Weber State	5	–	3	6	–	5
Northern Colorado	3	–	5	6	–	5
Montana State	3	–	5	5	–	6
Cal Poly	3	–	5	4	–	7
UC Davis	2	–	6	2	–	9
Idaho State	1	–	7	2	–	9
Sacramento State	1	–	7	2	–	9
$ – Conference champion; ^ – FCS playoff participant; Rankings from STATS Poll

The 2015 Northern Arizona Lumberjacks football team represented Northern Arizona University in the 2015 NCAA Division I FCS football season. They were led by 18th-year head coach Jerome Souers and played their home games at the Walkup Skydome. They were a member of the Big Sky Conference. They finished the season 7–4, 5–3 in Big Sky play to finish in a four-way tie for fourth place.

== Schedule ==
Date	Time	Opponent	Rank	Site	TV	Result	Attendance
September 5	4:00 pm	at No. 24 Stephen F. Austin*		Homer Bryce Stadium; Nacogdoches, TX	ESPN3	W 34–28	8,473
September 12	4:00 pm	New Mexico Highlands*		Walkup Skydome; Flagstaff, AZ	FSAZ+, FCSP	W 41–5	9,681
September 19	8:00 pm	at No. 20 (FBS) Arizona*	No. 24	Arizona Stadium; Tucson, AZ	P12N	L 13–77	51,494
September 26	1:00 pm	at No. 14 Montana		Washington–Grizzly Stadium; Missoula, MT	RTNW	L 14–23	26,136
October 3	4:00 pm	No. 11 Montana State		Walkup Skydome; Flagstaff, AZ	FSAZ+	W 49–41	9,431
October 10	4:00 pm	at UC Davis		Aggie Stadium; Davis, CA	WBS	L 24–38	6,432
October 24	4:00 pm	Weber State^{†}		Walkup Skydome; Flagstaff, AZ	FSAZ+	W 52–36	8,367
October 31	2:00 pm	Northern Colorado		Walkup Skydome; Flagstaff, AZ	FSAZ+	W 63–21	4,091
November 7	4:05 pm	at No. 4 Eastern Washington		Roos Field; Cheney, WA	FSAZ+	W 52–30	9,214
November 14	2:00 pm	Sacramento State		Walkup Skydome; Flagstaff, AZ	FSAZ+	W 49–35	5,937
November 21	3:00 pm	at No. 20 Southern Utah	No. 24	Eccles Coliseum; Cedar City, UT (Grand Canyon Rivalry)	WBS	L 41–49	9,022
*Non-conference game; ^{†}Homecoming; Rankings from STATS Poll released prior to the game; All times are in Mountain time

== Game summaries ==
=== At Stephen F. Austin ===
	1	2	3	4	Total
NAU Lumberjacks	10	10	7	7	34
#24 SFA Lumberjacks	7	7	0	14	28

=== New Mexico Highlands ===
	1	2	3	4	Total
Cowboys	0	0	3	2	5
Lumberjacks	17	14	0	10	41

=== At #20 (FBS) Arizona ===
	1	2	3	4	Total
#24 Lumberjacks	6	7	0	0	13
#20 (FBS) Wildcats	7	35	14	21	77

=== At Montana ===
	1	2	3	4	Total
Lumberjacks	0	0	14	0	14
#14 Grizzlies	10	6	0	7	23

=== Montana State ===
	1	2	3	4	Total
#11 Bobcats	7	7	6	21	41
Lumberjacks	14	14	14	7	49

=== At UC Davis ===
	1	2	3	4	Total
Lumberjacks	7	10	0	7	24
Aggies	14	3	14	7	38

=== Weber State ===
	1	2	3	4	Total
Wildcats	0	9	14	13	36
Lumberjacks	21	14	7	10	52

=== Northern Colorado ===
	1	2	3	4	Total
Bears	7	0	0	14	21
Lumberjacks	28	14	21	0	63

=== At Eastern Washington ===
	1	2	3	4	Total
Lumberjacks	7	7	10	28	52
#4 Eagles	0	7	7	16	30

=== Sacramento State ===
	1	2	3	4	Total
Hornets	14	0	0	21	35
Lumberjacks	14	21	7	7	49

=== At Southern Utah ===
	1	2	3	4	Total
#24 Lumberjacks	3	21	7	10	41
#20 Thunderbirds	7	7	21	14	49

== Ranking movements ==
Ranking movements Legend: ██ Increase in ranking ██ Decrease in ranking — = Not ranked RV = Received votes
	Week													
Poll	Pre	1	2	3	4	5	6	7	8	9	10	11	12	Final
STATS FCS	RV	RV	24	RV	RV	RV	RV	RV	RV	RV	RV	24	RV	RV
Coaches	RV	RV	24	RV	RV	RV	—	—	—	RV	25	20	23	RV
