= 2015 Idaho State Bengals football team =

American college football season

2015 Idaho State Bengals football
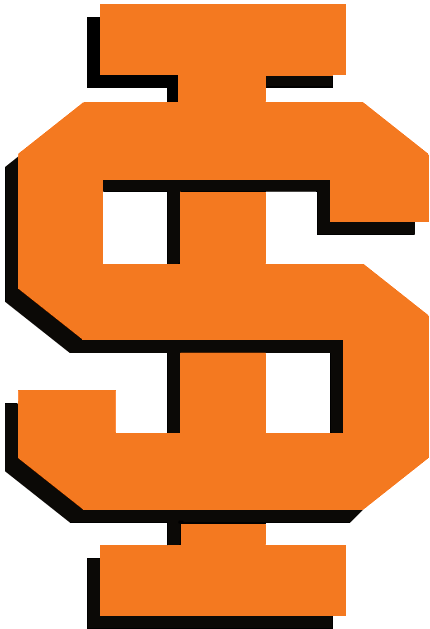
- Conference: Big Sky Conference
- Record: 2–9 (1–7 Big Sky)
- Head coach: Mike Kramer (5th season)
- Offensive coordinator: Sheldon Cross (1st season)
- Defensive coordinator: Spencer Toone (4th season)
- Home stadium: Holt Arena

2015 Big Sky Conference football standings
	Conf.			Overall
Team	W		L	W		L
No. 18 Southern Utah $^	7	–	1	8	–	4
No. 10 Portland State ^	6	–	2	9	–	3
No. 14 Montana ^	6	–	2	8	–	5
North Dakota	5	–	3	7	–	4
Northern Arizona	5	–	3	7	–	4
Eastern Washington	5	–	3	6	–	5
Weber State	5	–	3	6	–	5
Northern Colorado	3	–	5	6	–	5
Montana State	3	–	5	5	–	6
Cal Poly	3	–	5	4	–	7
UC Davis	2	–	6	2	–	9
Idaho State	1	–	7	2	–	9
Sacramento State	1	–	7	2	–	9
$ – Conference champion; ^ – FCS playoff participant; Rankings from STATS Poll

The 2015 Idaho State Bengals football team represented Idaho State University as a member of the Big Sky Conference during the 2015 NCAA Division I FCS football season. Led by fifth-year head coach Mike Kramer, the Bengals compiled an overall record of 2–9 with a mark of 1–7 in conference play, tying for 12th place in the Big Sky. Idaho State played their home games at Holt Arena in Pocatello, Idaho.

== Schedule ==
Date	Time	Opponent	Rank	Site	TV	Result	Attendance
September 5	4:05 pm	Black Hills State*	No. 22	Holt Arena; Pocatello, ID		W 55–0	6,028
September 12	4:05 pm	No. 24 Portland State	No. 23	Holt Arena; Pocatello, ID	WBS	L 14–34	7,075
September 18	7:00 pm	at Boise State*		Albertsons Stadium; Boise, ID	CBSSN	L 0–52	33,868
September 26	7:00 pm	at UNLV*		Sam Boyd Stadium; Whitney, NV	MWN	L 8–80	16,717
October 3	7:05 pm	at Cal Poly		Alex G. Spanos Stadium; San Luis Obispo, CA	WBS	L 26–58	7,523
October 10	12:00 pm	at No. 23 North Dakota		Alerus Center; Grand Forks, ND	WBS	W 37–31	9,188
October 17	2:35 pm	No. 8 Eastern Washington		Holt Arena; Pocatello, ID	WBS	L 28–45	8,942
October 24	7:05 pm	at Sacramento State		Hornet Stadium; Sacramento, CA		L 13–38	9,135
November 7	1:35 pm	No. 22 Montana		Holt Arena; Pocatello, ID	WBS	L 27–33 ^{OT}	7,795
November 14	1:35 pm	Montana State		Holt Arena; Pocatello, ID	WBS	L 20–44	6,498
November 21	1:00 pm	at Weber State		Stewart Stadium; Ogden, UT	WBS	L 14–35	6,137
*Non-conference game; Rankings from STATS Poll released prior to the game; All times are in Mountain time

== Game summaries ==
=== Black Hills State ===
	1	2	3	4	Total
Yellow Jackets	0	0	0	0	0
#22 Bengals	21	21	6	7	55

=== Portland State ===
	1	2	3	4	Total
#24 Vikings	17	7	7	3	34
#23 Bengals	7	7	0	0	14

=== At Boise State ===
	1	2	3	4	Total
Bengals	0	0	0	0	0
Broncos	14	7	28	3	52

=== At UNLV ===
	1	2	3	4	Total
Bengals	0	8	0	0	8
Rebels	35	17	21	7	80

=== At Cal Poly ===
	1	2	3	4	Total
Bengals	0	20	6	0	26
Mustangs	14	14	24	6	58

=== At North Dakota ===
	1	2	3	4	Total
Bengals	6	9	7	15	37
#23 North Dakota	14	7	10	0	31

=== Eastern Washington ===
	1	2	3	4	Total
#8 Eagles	14	17	7	7	45
Bengals	14	7	0	7	28

=== At Sacramento State ===
	1	2	3	4	Total
Bengals	7	3	3	0	13
Hornets	0	17	21	0	38

=== Montana ===
	1	2	3	4	OT	Total
#22 Grizzlies	14	7	3	3	6	33
Bengals	7	6	0	14	0	27

=== Montana State ===
	1	2	3	4	Total
Bobcats	17	10	14	3	44
Bengals	0	0	14	6	20

=== At Weber State ===
	1	2	3	4	Total
Bengals	0	0	7	7	14
Wildcats	7	7	14	7	35

== Ranking movements ==
Ranking movements Legend: ██ Increase in ranking ██ Decrease in ranking — = Not ranked RV = Received votes
	Week													
Poll	Pre	1	2	3	4	5	6	7	8	9	10	11	12	Final
STATS FCS	22	23	RV	RV	RV	—	—	—	—	—	—	—	—	—
Coaches	24	24	RV	—	—	—	RV	—	—	—	—	—	—	—
