= 2015 Eastern Washington Eagles football team =

Eastern Washington University football team

2015 Eastern Washington Eagles football
- Conference: Big Sky Conference
- Record: 6–5 (5–3 Big Sky)
- Head coach: Beau Baldwin (8th season)
- Offensive coordinator: Aaron Best (8th season)
- Defensive coordinator: Jeff Schmedding (1st season)
- Home stadium: Roos Field

2015 Big Sky Conference football standings
| | Conf. | | | Overall |
| Team | W | | L | W | | L |
|---|---|---|---|---|---|---|
| No. 18 Southern Utah $^ | 7 | – | 1 | 8 | – | 4 |
| No. 10 Portland State ^ | 6 | – | 2 | 9 | – | 3 |
| No. 14 Montana ^ | 6 | – | 2 | 8 | – | 5 |
| North Dakota | 5 | – | 3 | 7 | – | 4 |
| Northern Arizona | 5 | – | 3 | 7 | – | 4 |
| Eastern Washington | 5 | – | 3 | 6 | – | 5 |
| Weber State | 5 | – | 3 | 6 | – | 5 |
| Northern Colorado | 3 | – | 5 | 6 | – | 5 |
| Montana State | 3 | – | 5 | 5 | – | 6 |
| Cal Poly | 3 | – | 5 | 4 | – | 7 |
| UC Davis | 2 | – | 6 | 2 | – | 9 |
| Idaho State | 1 | – | 7 | 2 | – | 9 |
| Sacramento State | 1 | – | 7 | 2 | – | 9 |
$ – Conference champion; ^ – FCS playoff participant; Rankings from STATS Poll

The 2015 Eastern Washington Eagles football team represented Eastern Washington University in the 2015 NCAA Division I FCS football season. The team was coached by Beau Baldwin, who was in his eighth season with Eastern Washington. The Eagles played their home games at Roos Field in Cheney, Washington and were a member of the Big Sky Conference. They finished the season 6–5, 5–3 in Big Sky play to finish in a four way tie for fourth place. They failed to reach the FCS Playoffs for the first time since 2011.

== Schedule ==
| Date | Time | Opponent | Rank | Site | TV | Result | Attendance |
|---|---|---|---|---|---|---|---|
| September 5 | 5:00 pm | at No. 7 (FBS) Oregon* | No. 6 | Autzen Stadium; Eugene, OR | P12N | L 42–61 | 58,128 |
| September 12 | 2:00 pm | at No. 14 Northern Iowa* | No. 7 | UNI-Dome; Cedar Falls, IA | ESPN3 | L 35–38 | 12,292 |
| September 19 | 1:05 pm | No. 11 Montana State* | No. 14 | Roos Field; Cheney, WA | RTNW | W 55–50 | 10,912 |
| September 26 | 6:05 pm | at Sacramento State | No. 11 | Hornet Stadium; Sacramento, CA | WBS | W 28–20 | 7,211 |
| October 10 | 1:05 pm | Cal Poly | No. 7 | Roos Field; Cheney, WA | SWX | W 42–41 ^{OT} | 10,352 |
| October 17 | 1:35 pm | at Idaho State | No. 8 | Holt Arena; Pocatello, ID | WBS | W 45–28 | 8,942 |
| October 24 | 12:35 pm | at Northern Colorado | No. 7 | Nottingham Field; Greeley, CO | WBS | W 43–41 | 4,254 |
| October 31 | 12:05 pm | Weber State | No. 5 | Roos Field; Cheney, WA | RTNW | W 14–13 | 8,759 |
| November 7 | 3:05 pm | Northern Arizona^{†} | No. 4 | Roos Field; Cheney, WA | SWX | L 30–52 | 9,214 |
| November 14 | 12:35 pm | at No. 22 Montana | No. 10 | Washington–Grizzly Stadium; Missoula, MT (EWU–UM Governors Cup) | RTNW | L 16–57 | 25,213 |
| November 21 | 2:05 pm | No. 11 Portland State | No. 18 | Roos Field; Cheney, WA (The Dam Cup) | SWX | L 31–34 | 8,649 |
*Non-conference game; ^{†}Homecoming; Rankings from STATS Poll released prior to the game; All times are in Pacific time

Despite Montana State also being a member of the Big Sky Conference, the September 19 game against Eastern Washington was considered a non-conference game.

== Game summaries ==
=== At #7 (FBS) Oregon ===
| | 1 | 2 | 3 | 4 | Total |
|---|---|---|---|---|---|
| #6 Eagles | 7 | 14 | 14 | 7 | 42 |
| #7 (FBS) Ducks | 20 | 17 | 17 | 7 | 61 |

=== At Northern Iowa ===
| | 1 | 2 | 3 | 4 | Total |
|---|---|---|---|---|---|
| #7 Eagles | 7 | 7 | 7 | 14 | 35 |
| #14 Panthers | 0 | 21 | 0 | 17 | 38 |

=== Montana State ===
| | 1 | 2 | 3 | 4 | Total |
|---|---|---|---|---|---|
| #11 Bobcats | 7 | 10 | 14 | 19 | 50 |
| #14 Eagles | 21 | 13 | 14 | 7 | 55 |

=== At Sacramento State ===
| | 1 | 2 | 3 | 4 | Total |
|---|---|---|---|---|---|
| #11 Eagles | 0 | 7 | 0 | 21 | 28 |
| Hornets | 10 | 10 | 0 | 0 | 20 |

=== Cal Poly ===
| | 1 | 2 | 3 | 4 | OT | Total |
|---|---|---|---|---|---|---|
| Mustangs | 7 | 14 | 7 | 7 | 6 | 41 |
| #7 Eagles | 6 | 7 | 0 | 22 | 7 | 42 |

=== At Idaho State ===
| | 1 | 2 | 3 | 4 | Total |
|---|---|---|---|---|---|
| #8 Eagles | 14 | 17 | 7 | 7 | 45 |
| Bengals | 14 | 7 | 0 | 7 | 28 |

=== At Northern Colorado ===
| | 1 | 2 | 3 | 4 | Total |
|---|---|---|---|---|---|
| #7 Eagles | 6 | 13 | 7 | 17 | 43 |
| Bears | 7 | 7 | 14 | 13 | 41 |

=== Weber State ===
| | 1 | 2 | 3 | 4 | Total |
|---|---|---|---|---|---|
| Wildcats | 10 | 3 | 0 | 0 | 13 |
| #5 Eagles | 0 | 7 | 7 | 0 | 14 |

=== Northern Arizona ===
| | 1 | 2 | 3 | 4 | Total |
|---|---|---|---|---|---|
| Lumberjacks | 7 | 7 | 10 | 28 | 52 |
| #4 Eagles | 0 | 7 | 7 | 16 | 30 |

=== At Montana ===
| | 1 | 2 | 3 | 4 | Total |
|---|---|---|---|---|---|
| #10 Eagles | 3 | 6 | 7 | 0 | 16 |
| #22 Grizzlies | 14 | 16 | 20 | 7 | 57 |

=== Portland State ===
| | 1 | 2 | 3 | 4 | Total |
|---|---|---|---|---|---|
| #11 Vikings | 13 | 0 | 14 | 7 | 34 |
| #18 Eagles | 10 | 7 | 0 | 14 | 31 |

== Ranking movements ==
Ranking movements Legend: ██ Increase in ranking ██ Decrease in ranking RV = Received votes ( ) = First-place votes
| | Week | | | | | | | | | | | | | |
| Poll | Pre | 1 | 2 | 3 | 4 | 5 | 6 | 7 | 8 | 9 | 10 | 11 | 12 | Final |
|---|---|---|---|---|---|---|---|---|---|---|---|---|---|---|
| STATS | 6 | 7 (6) | 14 | 11 | 9 | 7 | 8 | 7 | 5 | 4 | 10 | 18 | 23 | RV |
| Coaches | 6 | 7 | 15 | 11 | 9 | 8 | 8 | 7 | 5 | 4 | 10 | 19 | RV | RV |
