= 2015 North Dakota Fighting Hawks football team =

American college football season

2015 North Dakota Fighting Hawks football
- Conference: Big Sky Conference
- Record: 7–4 (5–3 Big Sky)
- Head coach: Bubba Schweigert (2nd season)
- Offensive coordinator: Paul Rudolph (2nd season)
- Offensive scheme: Pistol
- Defensive coordinator: Eric Schmidt (2nd season)
- Base defense: 3–4
- Home stadium: Alerus Center

2015 Big Sky Conference football standings
	Conf.			Overall
Team	W		L	W		L
No. 18 Southern Utah $^	7	–	1	8	–	4
No. 10 Portland State ^	6	–	2	9	–	3
No. 14 Montana ^	6	–	2	8	–	5
North Dakota	5	–	3	7	–	4
Northern Arizona	5	–	3	7	–	4
Eastern Washington	5	–	3	6	–	5
Weber State	5	–	3	6	–	5
Northern Colorado	3	–	5	6	–	5
Montana State	3	–	5	5	–	6
Cal Poly	3	–	5	4	–	7
UC Davis	2	–	6	2	–	9
Idaho State	1	–	7	2	–	9
Sacramento State	1	–	7	2	–	9
$ – Conference champion; ^ – FCS playoff participant; Rankings from STATS Poll

The 2015 North Dakota Fighting Hawks football team represented the University of North Dakota during the 2015 NCAA Division I FCS football season. They were led by second year head coach Bubba Schweigert and played their home games at the Alerus Center. The Fighting Hawks are a member of the Big Sky Conference.

Although playing most of the season without an official mascot, 2015 was North Dakota's first year with their new nickname as it was announced on November 18 that the university had adopted the Fighting Hawks after a public vote of students, faculty, staff and other members of the University of North Dakota community.

The Fighting Hawks finished the season 7–4, 5–3 in Big Sky play to finish in a four way tie for fourth place.

== Schedule ==
Date	Time	Opponent	Rank	Site	TV	Result	Attendance	Source
September 5	3:00 pm	at Wyoming*		War Memorial Stadium; Laramie, WY		W 24–13	23,669	
September 12	5:00 pm	Drake*		Alerus Center; Grand Forks, ND	Midco SN	W 21–18	9,865	
September 19	2:30 pm	at No. 4 North Dakota State*		Fargodome; Fargo, ND (Rivalry)	NBC ND/ESPN3	L 9–34	19,044	
September 26	1:00 pm	UC Davis		Alerus Center; Grand Forks, ND	Midco SN	W 31–24	8,450	
October 3	4:00 pm	at No. 16 Portland State		Hillsboro Stadium; Hillsboro, OR	WBS	W 19–17	4,765	
October 10	1:00 pm	Idaho State^{†}	No. 23	Alerus Center; Grand Forks, ND	Midco SN	L 31–37	9,188	
October 17	7:00 pm	at Weber State		Stewart Stadium; Odgen, UT	WBS	L 24–25	5,461	
October 24	2:30 pm	at No. 19 Montana		Washington–Grizzly Stadium; Missoula, MT	RTNW	L 16–42	25,014	
October 31	1:00 pm	No. 19 Montana State		Alerus Center; Grand Forks, ND	Midco SN	W 44–38	7,090	
November 14	1:00 pm	Northern Colorado		Alerus Center; Grand Forks, ND	Midco SN	W 45–14	6,996	
November 21	8:05 pm	at Cal Poly		Alex G. Spanos Stadium; San Luis Obispo, CA	WBS	W 45–21	5,746	
*Non-conference game; ^{†}Homecoming; Rankings from STATS Poll released prior to the game; All times are in Central time

== Game summaries ==
=== Wyoming ===
	1	2	3	4	Total
North Dakota	7	7	0	10	24
Cowboys	0	0	0	13	13

=== Drake ===
	1	2	3	4	Total
Bulldogs	0	0	3	15	18
North Dakota	7	14	0	0	21

=== North Dakota State ===
	1	2	3	4	Total
North Dakota	3	0	6	0	9
#4 Bison	3	21	10	0	34

=== UC Davis ===
	1	2	3	4	Total
Aggies	7	3	7	7	24
North Dakota	14	7	10	0	31

=== Portland State ===
	1	2	3	4	Total
North Dakota	3	3	10	3	19
#16 Vikings	7	3	7	0	17

=== Idaho State ===
	1	2	3	4	Total
Bengals	6	9	7	15	37
#23 North Dakota	14	7	10	0	31

=== Weber State ===
	1	2	3	4	Total
North Dakota	7	10	0	7	24
Wildcats	3	7	0	15	25

=== Montana ===
	1	2	3	4	Total
North Dakota	7	6	0	3	16
#19 Grizzlies	7	14	14	7	42

=== Montana State ===
	1	2	3	4	Total
#19 Bobcats	7	17	7	7	38
North Dakota	21	10	7	6	44

=== Northern Colorado ===
	1	2	3	4	Total
Bears	0	0	0	14	14
North Dakota	7	28	10	0	45

=== Cal Poly ===
	1	2	3	4	Total
Fighting Hawks	7	21	7	10	45
Mustangs	0	0	14	7	21

== Ranking movements ==
Ranking movements Legend: ██ Increase in ranking ██ Decrease in ranking — = Not ranked RV = Received votes
	Week													
Poll	Pre	1	2	3	4	5	6	7	8	9	10	11	12	Final
STATS FCS	—	RV	RV	RV	RV	23	RV	RV	RV	RV	RV	RV	RV	
Coaches	—	RV	RV	—	RV	25	RV	RV	—	RV	RV	RV	RV	
