= 2015 Montana Grizzlies football team =

American college football season

2015 Montana Grizzlies football

FCS Playoffs Second Round, L 6–37 vs. North Dakota State
- Conference: Big Sky Conference

Ranking
- STATS: No. 14
- FCS Coaches: No. 14
- Record: 8–5 (6–2 Big Sky)
- Head coach: Bob Stitt (1st season)
- Defensive coordinator: Ty Gregorak (4th season)
- Home stadium: Washington–Grizzly Stadium

2015 Big Sky Conference football standings
	Conf.			Overall
Team	W		L	W		L
No. 18 Southern Utah $^	7	–	1	8	–	4
No. 10 Portland State ^	6	–	2	9	–	3
No. 14 Montana ^	6	–	2	8	–	5
North Dakota	5	–	3	7	–	4
Northern Arizona	5	–	3	7	–	4
Eastern Washington	5	–	3	6	–	5
Weber State	5	–	3	6	–	5
Northern Colorado	3	–	5	6	–	5
Montana State	3	–	5	5	–	6
Cal Poly	3	–	5	4	–	7
UC Davis	2	–	6	2	–	9
Idaho State	1	–	7	2	–	9
Sacramento State	1	–	7	2	–	9
$ – Conference champion; ^ – FCS playoff participant; Rankings from STATS Poll

The 2015 Montana Grizzlies football team represented the University of Montana in the 2015 NCAA Division I FCS football season. The Grizzlies were led by first-year coach Bob Stitt who took over after 15 years coaching the NCAA Division II Colorado Mines Orediggers. The Grizzlies played their home games on campus at Washington–Grizzly Stadium. Montana participated as a member of the Big Sky Conference, of which they are a charter member. They finished the season 8–5, 6–2 in Big Sky play to finish in a tie for second place. They received an at-large bid to the FCS Playoffs where they defeated South Dakota State in the first round before losing in the second round to North Dakota State.

On December 16, 2014, Stitt was announced as the team's new head coach. He signed a three-year contract.

== Schedule ==
Date	Time	Opponent	Rank	Site	TV	Result	Attendance
August 29	1:30 pm	No. 1 North Dakota State*	No. 13	Washington–Grizzly Stadium; Missoula, MT (FCS Kickoff)	ESPN	W 38–35	26,472
September 5	7:00 pm	Cal Poly*	No. 13	Washington–Grizzly Stadium; Missoula, MT	CMM	L 19–20	26,065
September 19	5:00 pm	at No. 15 Liberty*	No. 8	Williams Stadium; Lynchburg, VA	CMM/ESPN3	L 21–31	22,551
September 26	2:00 pm	Northern Arizona^{†}	No. 14	Washington–Grizzly Stadium; Missoula, MT	RTNW	W 23–14	26,136
October 3	2:00 pm	at UC Davis	No. 13	Aggie Stadium; Davis, CA	RTNW	W 27–13	6,241
October 10	2:00 pm	Weber State	No. 12	Washington–Grizzly Stadium; Missoula, MT	CMM	L 21–24 ^{OT}	25,500
October 24	1:30 pm	North Dakota	No. 19	Washington–Grizzly Stadium; Missoula, MT	RTNW	W 42–16	25,014
October 31	3:00 pm	at No. 12 Portland State	No. 17	Providence Park; Portland, OR	CMM	L 16–35	11,045
November 7	1:30 pm	at Idaho State	No. 22	Holt Arena; Pocatello, ID	CMM	W 33–27 ^{OT}	7,795
November 14	1:30 pm	No. 10 Eastern Washington	No. 22	Washington–Grizzly Stadium; Missoula, MT (EWU–UM Governors Cup)	RTNW	W 57–16	25,213
November 21	12:00 pm	at Montana State	No. 17	Bobcat Stadium; Bozeman, MT (rivalry)	RTNW	W 54–35	20,507
November 28	1:00 pm	No. 10 South Dakota State*	No. 16	Washington–Grizzly Stadium; Missoula, MT (NCAA Division I First Round)	ESPN3	W 24–17	14,575
December 5	1:30 pm	at No. 2 North Dakota State*	No. 16	Fargodome; Fargo, ND (NCAA Division Second Round)	ESPN3	L 6–37	18,232
*Non-conference game; ^{†}Homecoming; Rankings from STATS Poll released prior to the game; All times are in Mountain time

Despite also being a member of the Big Sky Conference, the game with Cal Poly on September 5 is considered a non-conference game.

== Game summaries ==
Final score source

=== North Dakota State ===
	1	2	3	4	Total
#1 Bison	7	21	0	7	35
#13 Grizzlies	10	11	7	10	38

=== Cal Poly ===
	1	2	3	4	Total
Mustangs	7	7	3	3	20
#13 Grizzlies	7	7	0	5	19

=== @ Liberty ===
	1	2	3	4	Total
#8 Grizzlies	0	12	7	2	21
#15 Flames	14	3	7	7	31

=== Northern Arizona ===
	1	2	3	4	Total
Lumberjacks	0	0	14	0	14
#14 Grizzlies	10	6	0	7	23

=== @ UC Davis ===
	1	2	3	4	Total
#13 Grizzlies	7	7	7	6	27
Aggies	6	7	0	0	13

=== Weber State ===
	1	2	3	4	OT	Total
Wildcats	7	14	0	0	3	24
#12 Grizzlies	14	0	0	7	0	21

=== North Dakota ===
	1	2	3	4	Total
North Dakota	7	3	0	6	16
#19 Grizzlies	7	14	14	7	42

=== @ Portland State ===
	1	2	3	4	Total
#17 Grizzlies	0	10	0	6	16
#12 Vikings	7	14	7	7	35

=== @ Idaho State ===
	1	2	3	4	OT	Total
#22 Grizzlies	14	7	3	3	6	33
Bengals	7	6	0	14	0	27

=== Eastern Washington ===
	1	2	3	4	Total
#10 Eagles	3	6	7	0	16
#22 Grizzlies	14	16	20	7	57

=== @ Montana State ===
	1	2	3	4	Total
#17 Grizzlies	17	20	7	10	54
Bobcats	7	7	8	13	35

== FCS Playoffs ==
=== First Round–South Dakota State ===
	1	2	3	4	Total
#10 Jackrabbits	0	0	10	7	17
#16 Grizzlies	7	17	0	0	24

=== Second Round–@ North Dakota State ===
	1	2	3	4	Total
#16 Grizzlies	0	0	6	0	6
#2 Bison	7	14	10	6	37

== Ranking movements ==
Ranking movements Legend: ██ Increase in ranking ██ Decrease in ranking т = Tied with team above or below ( ) = First-place votes
	Week													
Poll	Pre	1	2	3	4	5	6	7	8	9	10	11	12	Final
STATS FCS	13	8 (2)	8	14	13	12	20	19	17	22	22	17	16	14
Coaches	12	8 (3)	7	15	12	11	19	18	17	22–T	22	17	17	14
