= Tim Cramsey =

American football player and coach (born 1975)

Current position
- Title: Offensive coordinator
- Team: Arkansas
- Conference: SEC

Biographical details
- Born: October 8, 1975 (age 51); Allentown, Pennsylvania, U.S.
- Education: University of New Hampshire (BS, 1998)

Playing career
- 1994–1998: New Hampshire
- Positions: Quarterback, long snapper

Coaching career (HC unless noted)
- 2001: Allentown Central Catholic HS (PA) (OC)
- 2002: Emmaus HS (PA) (OC)
- 2003–2005: New Hampshire (TE/FB)
- 2006–2007: New Hampshire (RB)
- 2008: New Hampshire (QB)
- 2009–2011: New Hampshire (OC/QB)
- 2012: FIU (OC/QB)
- 2013–2015: Montana State (OC/QB)
- 2016: Nevada (OC/QB)
- 2017: Sam Houston State (OC/QB)
- 2018–2021: Marshall (OC/QB)
- 2022–2025: Memphis (OC/QB)
- 2026–present: Arkansas (OC)

Timothy John Cramsey (born October 8, 1975) is an American college football coach and former player. He is the offensive coordinator for the University of Arkansas, He has served as the offensive coordinator and quarterbacks coach for several universities, most recently Marshall University from 2018 to 2021 and Memphis University from 2022 to 2025.

== Coaching career ==
=== High School coaching ===
Cramsey got his coaching start, in 2001, as an assistant coach at his high school alma mater, Allentown Central Catholic High School in Allentown, Pennsylvania.

In 2002, he moved to Emmaus High School in Emmaus, Pennsylvania, as an assistant.

=== New Hampshire ===
In 2003, Cramsey returned to his college alma mater, the University of New Hampshire, as the tight ends and fullbacks coach. He held that position from 2003 to 2005, coached the running backs in 2006 and 2007, moved to quarterbacks in 2008. Prior to the 2009 season, Head Coach Sean McDonnell promoted Cramsey to offensive coordinator. He also continued coaching the quarterbacks through the 2011 season.

=== Florida International University ===
From there, Cramsey moved to Florida International University as the offensive coordinator and quarterbacks coach for the 2012 season.

=== Montana State ===
From 2013 to 2015, he served in the same role at Montana State University.

=== Nevada ===
In 2016, Cramsey jumped back to the FBS level, serving as the offensive coordinator for the Nevada Wolf Pack.

=== Sam Houston State ===
In 2017, he served as the offensive coordinator and quarterbacks coach at Sam Houston State University.

=== Marshall ===
On January 31, 2018, Head Coach Doc Holliday announced that Cramsey would join the Marshall coaching staff as the offensive coordinator and quarterbacks coach. In 2021 he was retained by Charles Huff as the team's offensive coordinator.

=== Memphis ===
In January 2022, Cramsey left Marshall for Memphis to be Ryan Silverfield's new offensive coordinator and quarterbacks coach.

=== Arkansas ===
In December 2025, Cramsey followed Silverfield to Arkansas to serve as the team's offensive coordinator.

== Playing career ==
Cramsey played quarterback for the New Hampshire Wildcats from 1994 to 1997. He was a two-year starter and four-year letter winner for head coach Bill Bowes.

== Personal life ==
The Allentown, Pennsylvania, native attended Allentown Central Catholic High School, where he quarterbacked the football team to their first ever state championship. He and his wife, Amy, have two sons, Brock, and Bryce.
