= Nick Whitworth =

American football coach and former player

Current position
- Title: Special teams coordinator
- Team: Wake Forest Demon Deacons
- Conference: ACC

Biographical details
- Born: Mackay, Idaho, U.S.
- Education: Idaho State University

Playing career
- 1998–2001: Idaho State
- Position: Running back

Coaching career (HC unless noted)
- 2002: Idaho State (GA)
- 2003–2009: Idaho State (STC/RB)
- 2010: Montana Western (OC/RB)
- 2011–2014: Central Washington (STC/RB)
- 2015–2018: Portland State (STC/RB)
- 2019–2021: Texas State (STC/RB)
- 2022–2024: Washington State (STC/TE)
- 2025–present: Wake Forest (STC)

Nick Whitworth is an American football coach and former player. He is currently the Special teams coordinator at Wake Forest. He has also coordinated special teams at Washington State, Texas State, Portland State, Central Washington and Idaho State.

== Coaching career ==
=== Idaho State ===
Immediately following the conclusion of Whitworth's playing career, he joined the coaching staff at his alma mater, Idaho State as a graduate assistant in 2001, working with the running backs and special teams for two years in this role. In 2003, he was promoted to the full-time staff as the running backs coach and special teams coordinator. He also coordinated the Bengals’ recruiting and summer camp programs. Over his tenure, Idaho State's special teams continued to improve, culminating in having the number 1 overall special teams unit in the Big Sky Conference in 2009. The Bengals ranked at the top of the conference in net punting, kick return defense, punt returns and 2nd in kick returns.

=== Montana Western ===
In 2010, Whitworth got his first shot to run an offense when he was hired as the offensive coordinator at Montana Western. He was also the running backs coach.

=== Central Washington ===
From 2011 to 2014, Whitworth was the special teams coordinator and running backs coach at Central Washington. Again, his special teams units showed constant improvement as the Wildcats ranked fifth nationally in punt return defense, 11th in kick return average and 13th in kick coverage in 2013. In 2014, the Wildcats led the nation in kick return average and ranked 18th in punt return average.

=== Portland State ===
From 2015 to 2018, Whitworth was the special teams coordinator and running backs coach at Portland State. In his first season with the Vikings, Whitworth coached former wide receiver turned running back David Jones to a 1000-yard rushing season. He also helped develop Jonathan Gonzales in to an All-Big Sky kicker and Kameron Canaday in to an All-American and future NFL long snapper. Canaday went on to play five seasons in the NFL, spending 2016 with the Arizona Cardinals, and 2017–2020 with the Pittsburgh Steelers. In 2016, Whitworth coached running backs Nate Tago and Paris Penn to all-conference seasons, while also coaching Gonzales to another all-conference season, along with punter Mason Kinsella, and special teamer Mitchell Thompson. Under Whitworth's watch, Thompson was again named all-conference in 2017, and in 2018, Whitworth guiding freshman kicker Cody Williams to an all-conference nod.

=== Texas State ===
From 2019 to 2021, Whitworth was the special teams coordinator at Texas State. During his time at Texas State, Whitworth led a resurgence in special teams play as the Bobcats led the Sun Belt Conference in punt returns and kickoff coverage during the 2020 season. During that season, Whitworth mentored senior Jeremiah Haydel, who became the Bobcats' first FBS First-Team All-American return specialist. Haydel ranked third nationally in combined kick return yardage and was one of only two FBS players to return a kickoff and punt for touchdowns in his first season as a returner.

The Bobcat offense was also stellar in 2020, increase its rushing output by nearly 65 percent from the previous season and averaged 369.7 yards of total offense and 27.7 points per game.

=== Washington State ===
In January 2022, Whitworth was hired as the new special teams coordinator and tight ends coach at Washington State by new head coach Jake Dickert. He is the first tight ends coach in over a decade, as the Cougars had long been an Air raid offense under Mike Leach and Nick Rolovich.

=== Wake Forest ===
Following the 2024 season, Dickert was hired as the new head coach at Wake Forest. Soon after, Whitworth joined the staff as the special teams coordinator.

== Playing career ==
Whitworth was a running back and return specialist during his playing career at Idaho State, eventually earning all-conference honors at both positions. He was an all-conference, all-area, and all-state player at Mackay High School in Mackay, Idaho.

== Personal life ==
Whitworth earned a bachelor's degree in business administration and business finance at Idaho State in 2001.
