= 2015 NCAA Division I FCS football rankings =

- Season: 2015
- Duration: August 2015 – January 2016
- National Champions: January 3, 2016

Two human polls comprise the 2015 National Collegiate Athletic Association (NCAA) Division I Football Championship Subdivision (FCS) football rankings, in addition to various publications' preseason polls. Unlike the Football Bowl Subdivision (FBS), college football's governing body, the NCAA, bestows the national championship title through a 24-team tournament. The following weekly polls determine the top 25 teams at the NCAA Division I Football Championship Subdivision level of college football for the 2015 season. The STATS poll is voted by media members while the Coaches' Poll is determined by coaches at the FCS level. STATS LLC acquired The Sports Network, which previously sponsored the media poll, in early 2015.

== Legend ==
Legend
	Increase in ranking
	Decrease in ranking
	Not ranked previous week
Italics	Number of first place votes
(#–#)	Win–loss record
т	Tied with team above or below also with this symbol

== STATS Poll ==
	Preseason Aug 10	Week 1 Sep 7	Week 2 Sep 14	Week 3 Sep 21	Week 4 Sep 28	Week 5 Oct 5	Week 6 Oct 12	Week 7 Oct 19	Week 8 Oct 26	Week 9 Nov 2	Week 10 Nov 9	Week 11 Nov 16	Week 12 Nov 22	Week 13 (Final) Jan 11	
1.	North Dakota State 144	Sam Houston State 31 (0–1)	Jacksonville State 39 (1–1)	Jacksonville State 93 (3–1)	Jacksonville State 89 (4–1)	Jacksonville State 89 (4–1)	Jacksonville State 89 (5–1)	Jacksonville State 108 (5–1)	Jacksonville State 107 (6–1)	Jacksonville State 139 (7–1)	Jacksonville State 149 (8–1)	Jacksonville State 145 (9–1)	Jacksonville State 135 (10–1)	North Dakota State 150 (13–2)	1.
2.	Illinois State 3	North Dakota State 22 (0–1)	Coastal Carolina 36 (2–0)	Coastal Carolina 36 (4–0)	Coastal Carolina 40 (5–0)	Coastal Carolina 39 (5–0)	North Dakota State 27 (4–2)	Coastal Carolina 27 (6–0)	Coastal Carolina 33 (7–0)	Illinois State 18 (7–1)	North Dakota State (7–2)	North Dakota State (8–2)	North Dakota State 2 (9–2)	Jacksonville State (13–2)	2.
3.	Sam Houston State	Coastal Carolina 24 (1–0)	Sam Houston State 38 (0–1)	North Dakota State 17 (2–1)	North Dakota State 16 (3–1)	North Dakota State 20 (3–1)	Coastal Carolina 30 (6–0)	Illinois State 6 (5–1)	Illinois State 20 (6–1)	Chattanooga (7–1)	McNeese State 12 (9–0)	McNeese State 10 (9–0)	McNeese State 10 (10–0)	Sam Houston State (11–4)	3.
4.	Villanova	Illinois State 20 (0–1)	North Dakota State 23 (1–1)	Illinois State 2 (2–1)	Illinois State 2 (3–1)	Illinois State 1 (3–1)	Illinois State 1 (5–1)	James Madison 18 (7–0)	Chattanooga (6–1)	Eastern Washington (6–2)	Coastal Carolina (8–1)	Coastal Carolina (9–1)	Illinois State (9–2)	Richmond (10–4)	4.
5.	Coastal Carolina	Jacksonville State 24 (1–0)	Illinois State 6 (1–1)	Villanova 4 (2–2)	South Dakota State 6 (3–1)	James Madison 8 (5–0)	James Madison 12 (7–0)	Chattanooga (5–1)	Eastern Washington (5–2)	Richmond (6–2)	South Dakota State (7–2)	South Dakota State (8–2)	Portland State (9–2)	Illinois State (10–3)	5.
6.	Eastern Washington	Villanova 6 (0–1)	Villanova 4 (1–1)	South Dakota State 6 (3–0)	James Madison 4 (5–0)	Chattanooga (3–1)	Chattanooga (5–1)	South Dakota State (5–1)	Richmond (6–1)	North Dakota State (6–2)	Illinois State (7–2)	Illinois State (8–2)	Sam Houston State (8–3)	Charleston Southern (10–3)	6.
7.	Jacksonville State	Eastern Washington 6 (0–1)	South Dakota State 8 (2–0)	Northern Iowa (2–1)	Northern Iowa 1 (2–2)	Eastern Washington (2–2)	South Dakota State (5–1)	Eastern Washington (4–2)	North Dakota State (5–2)	Sam Houston State (6–2)	William & Mary (7–2)	William & Mary (8–2)	Chattanooga (8–3)	McNeese State (10–1)	7.
8.	Chattanooga	Montana 2 (1–1)	Montana (1–1)	Chattanooga (3–1)	Chattanooga (3–1)	South Dakota State (3–1)	Eastern Washington (4–2)	North Dakota State (4–2)	Sam Houston State (5–2)	Coastal Carolina (7–1)	Chattanooga (7–2)	Chattanooga (8–2)	James Madison (9–2)	Northern Iowa (9–5)	8.
9.	New Hampshire	South Dakota State 8 (1–0)	Northern Iowa (1–1)	James Madison (4–0)	Eastern Washington (2–2)	Youngstown State (3–1)	Sam Houston State (4–2)	Sam Houston State (4–2)	James Madison (7–1)	McNeese State 1 (8–0)	Richmond (7–2)	Charleston Southern 1 (9–1)	Charleston Southern (9–2)	Chattanooga (9–4)	9.
10.	Northern Iowa	Chattanooga (0–1)	Chattanooga (1–1)	Liberty (2–2)	Youngstown State (3–1)	Northern Iowa (2–3)	Fordham (6–1)	Fordham (6–1)	McNeese State (7–0)	Portland State 1 (7–1)	Eastern Washington (6–3)	Sam Houston State (7–3)	South Dakota State (8–3)	Portland State (9–3)	10.
11.	Montana State	Montana State (1–0)	Montana State (1–0)	Eastern Washington (2–2)	Montana State (2–2)	Sam Houston State (2–2)	Youngstown State (3–3)	Richmond (5–1)	Fordham (7–1)	South Dakota State (6–2)	Charleston Southern (8–1)	Portland State (8–2)	Coastal Carolina (9–2)	James Madison (9–3)	11.
12.	James Madison	New Hampshire (0–1)	James Madison (2–0)	Sam Houston State (1–2)	Sam Houston State (2–2)	Montana (3–2)	Northern Iowa (2–4)	McNeese State (6–0)	Portland State (6–1)	William & Mary (6–2)	Harvard (8–0)	James Madison (8–2)	Richmond (8–3)	William & Mary (9–4)	12.
13.	Montana	James Madison (1–0)	New Hampshire (1–1)	Youngstown State (2–1)	Montana (3–2)	Fordham (4–1)	Richmond (5–1)	Eastern Kentucky (4–2)	Eastern Kentucky (5–2)	Harvard (7–0)	Sam Houston State (6–3)	Fordham (9–2)	William & Mary (8–3)	The Citadel (9–4)	13.
14.	Youngstown State	Northern Iowa (0–1)	Eastern Washington (0–2)	Montana (2–2)	Villanova (2–2)	Villanova (2–2)	Eastern Kentucky (4–2)	Portland State (5–1)	South Dakota State (5–2)	James Madison (7–2)	James Madison (7–2)	Richmond (7–3)	Fordham (9–2)	Montana (8–5)	14.
15.	Liberty	Liberty (1–0)	Liberty (1–1)	Montana State (2–1)	Fordham (4–1)	Liberty (3–2)	McNeese State (6–0)	Harvard (5–0)	Harvard (6–0)	Charleston Southern (7–1)	Portland State (7–2)	Northern Iowa (6–4)	Northern Iowa (7–4)	South Dakota State (8–4)	15.
16.	South Dakota State	Fordham (1–0)	Youngstown State (1–1)	Fordham (3–1)	Portland State (3–1)	Richmond (3–1)	Montana State (3–3)	Youngstown State (3–3)	William & Mary (5–2)	Fordham (7–2)	Fordham (8–2)	North Carolina A&T (9–1)	Montana (7–4)	Coastal Carolina (9–3)	16.
17.	Eastern Kentucky	Youngstown State (0–1)	Cal Poly (1–1)	Portland State (3–0)	Eastern Kentucky (2–2)	Eastern Kentucky (2–2)	Portland State (5–1)	William & Mary (4–2)	Montana (4–3)	Northern Iowa (4–4)	Northern Iowa (5–4)	Montana (6–4)	Southern Utah (8–3)	Colgate (9–5)	17.
18.	Richmond	Cal Poly 1 (1–0)	Fordham (1–1)	Eastern Kentucky (2–1)	Liberty (2–2)	Montana State (2–2)	Harvard (5–0)	Indiana State (4–2)	Northern Iowa (3–4)	Eastern Kentucky (5–3)	Southern Utah (7–2)	Eastern Washington (6–4)	The Citadel (8–3)	Southern Utah (8–4)	18.
19.	Southeastern Louisiana	Eastern Kentucky (1–0)	Portland State (2–0)	Richmond (2–1)	Richmond (3–1)	Indiana State (3–1)	New Hampshire (3–3)	Montana (3–3)	Montana State (4–3)	North Carolina A&T (7–1)	North Carolina A&T (8–1)	Harvard (8–1)	Harvard (9–1)	Fordham (9–3)	19.
20.	Fordham	Southeastern Louisiana (1–0)	Southeastern Louisiana (2–0)	Cal Poly (1–3)	New Hampshire (3–2)	Southeastern Louisiana (3–1)	Montana (3–3)	Western Illinois (4–2)	North Carolina A&T (6–1)	Southern Utah (6–2)	Youngstown State (5–4)	Southern Utah (7–3)	Dartmouth (9–1)	Harvard (9–1)	20.
21.	Indiana State	Indiana State (1–0)	Eastern Kentucky (1–1)	New Hampshire (2–2)	Indiana State (3–1)	New Hampshire (3–2)	Indiana State (4–2)	Montana State (3–3)	Indiana State (4–3)	Youngstown State (4–4)	The Citadel (7–2)	Dartmouth (8–1)	Grambling State (8–2)	North Carolina A&T (10–2)	21.
22.	Idaho State	Richmond (0–1)	Richmond (1–1)	Indiana State (2–1)	Southeastern Louisiana (3–1)	McNeese State (4–0)	Liberty (3–4)	Northern Iowa (2–4)	Dartmouth (6–0)	Montana (4–4)	Montana (5–4)	Grambling State (8–2)	North Carolina A&T (9–2)	Western Illinois (7–6)	22.
23.	Harvard	Idaho State (1–0)	Indiana State (1–1)	Southeastern Louisiana (2–1)	McNeese State (4–0)	North Dakota (4–1)	Southeastern Louisiana (3–3)	Villanova (3–3)	Western Illinois (4–3)	Indiana State (4–4)	Dartmouth (7–1)	Eastern Kentucky (6–4)	Eastern Washington (6–5)	Dartmouth (9–1)	23.
24.	Stephen F. Austin	Portland State (1–0)	Northern Arizona (2–0)	Harvard (2–0)	Harvard (3–0)	Harvard (3–0)	William & Mary (4–2)	North Carolina A&T (5–1)	Charleston Southern (6–1)	Dartmouth (6–1)	Eastern Kentucky (5–4)	Northern Arizona (7–3)	Eastern Illinois (7–4)	Grambling State (9–3)	24.
25.	McNeese State	Harvard (0–0)	Harvard (0–0)	McNeese State (3–0)	William & Mary (2–2)	Portland State (3–1)	Villanova (3–3)	Dartmouth (5–0)	Youngstown State (3–4)	The Citadel (6–2)	Grambling State (7–2)	The Citadel (7–3)	Bethune-Cookman (9–2)	Eastern Illinois (7–5)	25.
	Preseason Aug 10	Week 1 Sep 7	Week 2 Sep 14	Week 3 Sep 21	Week 4 Sep 28	Week 5 Oct 5	Week 6 Oct 12	Week 7 Oct 19	Week 8 Oct 26	Week 9 Nov 2	Week 10 Nov 9	Week 11 Nov 16	Week 12 Nov 22	Week 13 (Final) Jan 11	
		Dropped: 24. Stephen F. Austin; 25. McNeese State	Dropped: 23. Idaho State	Dropped: 24. Northern Arizona	Dropped: 20. Cal Poly	Dropped: 25. William & Mary	Dropped: 23. North Dakota	Dropped: 19. New Hampshire; 22. Liberty; 23. Southeastern Louisiana	Dropped: 23. Villanova	Dropped: 19. Montana State; 23. Western Illinois	Dropped: 23. Indiana State	Dropped: 20. Youngstown State	Dropped: 23. Eastern Kentucky; 24. Northern Arizona	Dropped: 23. Eastern Washington; 25. Bethune-Cookman	

== Coaches' Poll ==
	Preseason Aug 5	Week 1 Sep 7	Week 2 Sep 14	Week 3 Sep 21	Week 4 Sep 28	Week 5 Oct 5	Week 6 Oct 12	Week 7 Oct 19	Week 8 Oct 26	Week 9 Nov 2	Week 10 Nov 9	Week 11 Nov 16	Week 12 Nov 23	Week 13 (Final) Jan 11	
1.	North Dakota State 24	Coastal Carolina 4 (1–0)	Coastal Carolina 14 (2–0)	Coastal Carolina 18 (3–0)	Coastal Carolina 17 (4–0)	Coastal Carolina 16 (5–0)	Coastal Carolina 15 (6–0)	Coastal Carolina 15 (6–0)	Coastal Carolina 15 (7–0)	Jacksonville State 23 (7–1)	Jacksonville State 25 (8–1)	Jacksonville State 24 (9–1)	Jacksonville State 20 (10–1)	North Dakota State 25 (13–2)	1.
2.	Illinois State	North Dakota State 6 (0–1) т	North Dakota State (1–1)	North Dakota State 4 (2–1)	North Dakota State 4 (2–1)	North Dakota State 6 (3–1)	North Dakota State 5 (4–1)	Jacksonville State 5 (5–1)	Jacksonville State 8 (6–1)	Illinois State 3 (7–1)	McNeese State 1 (9–0)	McNeese State 2 (9–0)	McNeese State 1 (10–0)	Jacksonville State (13–2)	2.
3.	Villanova	Villanova (0–1) т	Villanova (1–1)	Jacksonville State 3 (2–1)	Jacksonville State 3 (3–1)	Jacksonville State 4 (4–1)	Jacksonville State 4 (4–1)	James Madision 3 (7–0)	Illinois State 3 (6–1)	Chattanooga (7–1)	North Dakota State (7–2)	North Dakota State (8–2)	North Dakota State 1 (9–2)	Richmond (10–4)	3.
4.	Sam Houston State	Sam Houston State 2 (0–1)	Jacksonville State 5 (1–1)	Villanova (2–1)	Illinois State (2–1)	Illinois State (3–1)	Illinois State (4–1)	Illinois State 2 (5–1)	Chattanooga (6–1)	Eastern Washington (6–2)	Coastal Carolina (8–1)	Coastal Carolina (9–1)	Illinois State (9–2)	Sam Houston State (11–4)	4.
5.	Coastal Carolina	Illinois State 6 (0–1)	Sam Houston State (0–1)	Illinois State (2–1)	James Madison 1 (4–0)	James Madison (5–0)	James Madison 2 (6–0)	Chattanooga (5–1)	Eastern Washington (4–2)	McNeese State (8–0)	South Dakota State (7–2)	South Dakota State (8–2)	Portland State (9–2)	Illinois State (10–3)	5.
6.	Eastern Washington	Jacksonville State 1 (1–0)	Illinois State 1 (1–1)	Northern Iowa (2–1)	Northern Iowa (2–1)	Chattanooga (3–1)	Chattanooga (4–1)	South Dakota State (5–1)	North Dakota State (5–2)	North Dakota State (6–2)	Illinois State (7–2)	Illinois State (8–2)	James Madison (9–2)	Northern Iowa (9–5)	6.
7.	New Hampshire	Eastern Washington (0–1)	Montana (1–1)	South Dakota State 1 (2–0)	South Dakota State 1 (3–0)	Youngstown State (3–1)	South Dakota State (4–1)	Eastern Washington (3–2)	McNeese State (7–0)	Richmond (7–1)	William & Mary (7–2)	William & Mary (8–2)	Charleston Southern (9–2)	Charleston Southern (10–3)	7.
8.	Chattanooga	Montana 3 (1–1)	South Dakota State 2 (2–0)	James Madison (3–0)	Chattanooga (3–1)	Eastern Washington (2–2)	Eastern Washington (3–2)	North Dakota State (4–2)	Richmond (6–1)	Coastal Carolina (7–1)	Charleston Southern (8–1)	Charleston Southern (9–1)	Chattanooga (8–3)	Chattanooga (9–4)	8.
9.	Jacksonville State	Montana State (1–0)	Montana State (1–0)	Chattanooga (2–1)	Eastern Washington (2–2)	South Dakota State (3–1)	McNeese State (5–0)	McNeese State (6–0)	James Madison (7–1)	Portland State (7–1)	Chattanooga (7–2)	Chattanooga (8–2)	Coastal Carolina (9–2)	McNeese State (10–2)	9.
10.	Northern Iowa	South Dakota State 1 (1–0)	James Madison (2–0)	Liberty (2–1)	Youngstown State (2–1)	Northern Iowa (2–2)	Fordham (5–1)	Sam Houston State (4–2)	Sam Houston State (5–2)	Sam Houston State (6–2)	Eastern Washington (6–3)	James Madison (8–2)	Sam Houston State (8–3)	Portland State (9–3)	10.
11.	Montana State	James Madison (1–0)	Northern Iowa (1–1)	Eastern Washington (1–2)	Montana State (2–1)	Montana (3–2)	Sam Houston State (3–2)	Fordham (6–1)	Fordham (7–1)	South Dakota State (6–2)	James Madison (7–2)	Portland State (8–2)	Richmond (8–3)	James Madison (9–3)	11.
12.	Montana	Chattanooga (0–1)	Chattanooga (1–1)	Youngstown State (2–1)	Montana (2–2)	Fordham (4–1)	Youngstown State (3–2)	Richmond (5–1)	Portland State (6–1)	William & Mary (6–2)	Richmond (7–2)	Sam Houston State (7–3)	South Dakota State (8–3)	William & Mary (9–4)	12.
13.	James Madison	Liberty (1–0)	New Hampshire (1–1)	Montana State (1–1)	Fordham (3–1)	McNeese State (4–0)	Richmond (4–1)	Portland State (5–1)	South Dakota State (5–2)	Charleston Southern (7–1)	Harvard (8–0)	North Carolina A&T (9–1)	William & Mary (8–3)	Colgate (9–5)	13.
14.	Liberty	Northern Iowa (0–1)	Liberty (1–1)	Sam Houston State (0–2)	Sam Houston State (1–2)	Sam Houston State (2–2)	Northern Iowa (2–3)	Eastern Kentucky (4–2)	Eastern Kentucky (5–2)	James Madison (7–2)	North Carolina A&T (8–1)	Fordham (9–2)	Northern Iowa (7–4)	Montana (8–5)	14.
15.	South Dakota State	New Hampshire (0–1)	Eastern Washington (0–2)	Montana (1–2)	McNeese State (3–0)	Liberty (3–2)	Eastern Kentucky (3–2)	Harvard (5–0)	William & Mary (5–2)	Harvard (7–0)	Southern Utah (7–2)	Northern Iowa (6–4)	Fordham (9–2)	The Citadel (9–4)	15.
16.	Youngstown State	Fordham (1–0)	Youngstown State (1–1)	Fordham (2–1)	Portland State (3–0)	Villanova (2–2)	Montana State (3–2)	William & Mary (4–2)	Harvard (6–0)	North Carolina A&T (7–1)	Portland State (7–2)	Richmond (7–3)	Southern Utah (8–3)	South Dakota State (8–4)	16.
17.	Eastern Kentucky	Youngstown State (0–1)	Southeastern Louisiana (2–0)	McNeese State (2–0)	Villanova (2–2)	Southeastern Louisiana (3–1)	Portland State (4–1)	Youngstown State (3–3)	Montana (4–3)	Fordham (7–2)	Fordham (8–2)	Montana (6–4)	Montana (7–4)	Coastal Carolina (9–3)	17.
18.	Richmond	Southeastern Louisiana (1–0)	Cal Poly (1–1)	Portland State (2–0)	Liberty 92–2)	Richmond (3–1)	Harvard (4–0)	Montana (3–3)	Montana State (4–3)	Southern Utah (6–2)	Sam Houston State (6–3)	Southern Utah (7–3)	The Citadel (8–3)	Southern Utah (8–4)	18.
19.	Southeastern Louisiana	Eastern Kentucky (1–0)	Fordham (1–1)	Southeastern Louisiana (2–1)	Southeastern Louisiana (2–1)	Montana State (2–2)	Montana (3–3)	Montana State (3–3)	Charleston Southern (6–1)	Eastern Kentucky (5–3)	Northern Iowa (5–4)	Eastern Washington (6–4)	Harvard (9–1)	Fordham (9–3)	19.
20.	Indiana State	Cal Poly (1–0)	Portland State (2–0)	Richmond (2–1)	Richmond (2–1)	Eastern Kentucky 92–2)	New Hampshire (3–2)	Charleston Southern (5–1)	North Carolina A&T (6–1)	Northern Iowa (4–4)	The Citadel (7–2)	Northern Arizona (7–3)	North Carolina A&T (9–2)	Harvard (9–1)	20.
21.	Fordham	Indiana State (1–0)	McNeese State (1–10)	Eastern Kentucky (1–1)	Eastern Kentucky (2–1)	Indiana State (3–1)	Southeastern Louisiana (3–2)	Indiana State (4–2)	Northern Iowa (3–4)	Youngstown State (4–4)	Youngstown State (5–4)	Harvard (8–1)	Bethune-Cookman (9–2)	North Carolina A&T (10–2)	21.
22.	Harvard	Richmond (0–1)	Eastern Kentucky (1–1)	Cal Poly (1–2)	William & Mary (2–1)	New Hampshire (3–2)	Liberty (3–3)	Villanova (3–3)	Dartmouth (6–0)	The Citadel (6–2)	Montana (5–4)	Bethune-Cookman (8–2)	Dartmouth (9–1)	Western Illinois (7–6)	22.
23.	McNeese State	McNeese State (0–0)	Richmond (1–1)	Indiana State (2–1)	New Hampshire (2–2)	Portland State (3–1)	Charleston Southern (4–1)	Western Illinois (4–2)	Indiana State (4–3)	Montana (4–4)	Bethune-Cookman (8–2)	Dartmouth (8–1)	Northern Arizona (7–4)	Eastern Illinois (7–5)	23.
24.	Idaho State	Idaho State (1–0)	Northern Arizona (2–0)	New Hampshire (1–2)	Indiana State (2–1)	Harvard (3–0)	Villanova (2–3) т	North Carolina A&T (5–1)	Southern Utah (5–2)	Montana State (4–4)	Dartmouth (7–1)	The Citadel (7–3)	Grambling State (8–2)	Dartmouth (9–1)	24.
25.	Eastern Illinois	Harvard (0–0) т; William & Mary (1–0) т	Indiana State (1–1)	William & Mary (1–1)	Harvard (2–0)	North Dakota (4–1)	William & Mary (3–2) т	Northern Iowa (2–4)	Youngstown State (3–4)	Bethune-Cookman (7–2)	Northern Arizona (6–3)	Central Arkansas (7–3)	Eastern Illinois (7–4)	Bethune-Cookman (9–2)	25.
	Preseason Aug 5	Week 1 Sep 7	Week 2 Sep 14	Week 3 Sep 21	Week 4 Sep 28	Week 5 Oct 5	Week 6 Oct 12	Week 7 Oct 19	Week 8 Oct 26	Week 9 Nov 2	Week 10 Nov 9	Week 11 Nov 16	Week 12 Nov 23	Week 13 (Final) Jan 11	
		Dropped: 25. Eastern Illinois	Dropped: 24. Idaho State; T-25. Harvard; T-25. William & Mary	Dropped: 24. Northern Arizona	Dropped: 22. Cal Poly	Dropped: 22. William & Mary	Dropped: 21. Indiana State; 25. North Dakota	Dropped: 20. New Hampshire; 21. Southeastern Louisiana; 22. Liberty	Dropped: 22. Villanova; 23. Western Illinois	Dropped: 22. Dartmouth; 23. Indiana State	Dropped: 19. Eastern Kentucky; 24. Montana State	Dropped: 21. Youngstown State	Dropped: 19. Eastern Washington; 25. Central Arkansas	Dropped: 21. Northern Arizona; 24. Grambling State	
