= 2015 Southern Conference football season =

- League: NCAA Division I FCS (Football Championship Subdivision)
- Sport: Football
- Duration: September 5, 2015 – November 22, 2015
- Teams: 8
- TV partner(s): SoCon Digital Network; American Sports Network; ESPN3
- Conference champions: Chattanooga Mocs; The Citadel Bulldogs

Southern Conference football seasons
- ← 2014 2016 →

2015 Southern Conference football standings
	Conf.			Overall
Team	W		L	W		L
No. 9 Chattanooga +^	6	–	1	9	–	4
No. 13 The Citadel +^	6	–	1	9	–	4
Western Carolina	5	–	2	7	–	4
Samford	3	–	4	6	–	5
Wofford	3	–	4	5	–	6
Mercer	2	–	5	5	–	6
Furman	2	–	5	4	–	7
VMI	1	–	6	2	–	9
+ – Conference co-champions; ^ – FCS playoff participant; Rankings from STATS Poll

The 2015 Southern Conference football season was the 94th season of college football for the Southern Conference (SoCon) and formed a part of the 2015 NCAA Division I FCS football season.

== Head coaches ==
- Russ Huesman, Chattanooga – 7th year
- Mike Houston, The Citadel – 2nd year
- Bruce Fowler, Furman – 5th year
- Bobby Lamb, Mercer – 3rd year
- Chris Hatcher, Samford – 1st year
- Scott Wachenheim, VMI – 1st year
- Mark Speir, Western Carolina – 4th year
- Mike Ayers, Wofford – 28th year

== Preseason poll results ==
First place votes in parentheses

Media			Coaches		
Place	School	Points	Place	School	Points
1	Chattanooga (29)	239	1	Chattanooga (7)	49
2	Western Carolina (1)	190	2	Samford (1)	40
3	Samford	176	3	Western Carolina	68
4	Wofford	148	4	Wofford	30
5	Furman	120	5	Furman	22
6	Mercer	93	6	Mercer	20
7	The Citadel	82	7	The Citadel	18
8	VMI	32	8	VMI	7

=== Preseason All-Conference Teams ===
Offensive Player of the Year: Jacob Huesman, Sr., QB (Chattanooga)
Defensive Player of the Year: Michael Pierce, Sr., DL (Samford)

Position	Player	Class	Team
First Team Offense
QB	Jacob Huesman	Sr.	Chattanooga
RB	Alex Lakes	So.	Mercer
RB	Denzel Williams	Jr.	Samford
WR	Karel Hamilton	Jr.	Samford
WR	Spearman Robinson	Jr.	Western Carolina
TE	Duncan Fletcher	Jr.	Furman
OL	Sam Frye	Sr.	The Citadel
OL	Joe Turner	Sr.	Furman
OL	Gunnar Bromelow	Sr.	Samford
OL	Corey Levin	Jr.	Chattanooga
OL	Anton Wahrby	Jr.	Wofford
First Team Defense
DL	Mitchell Jeter	Sr.	The Citadel
DL	Michael Pierce	Sr.	Samford
DL	Josh Freeman	Sr.	Chattanooga
DL	Keionta Davis	Jr.	Chattanooga
LB	Cory Magwood	Sr.	Furman
LB	Justin Cooper	Sr.	Samford
LB	Nakevion Leslie	Jr.	Chattanooga
DB	James Bradberry	Sr.	Samford
DB	Dee Virgin	Jr.	Chattanooga
DB	Lucas Webb	So.	Chattanooga
DB	Trey Morgan	Jr.	Western Carolina
First Team Special Teams
PK	Henrique Ribeiro	Jr.	Chattanooga
P	Brian Sanders	Sr.	Wofford
RS	Chandler Curtis	So.	Mercer

== Rankings ==
Legend
Increase in ranking
Decrease in ranking
Not ranked previous week

		Pre	Wk 1	Wk 2	Wk 3	Wk 4	Wk 5	Wk 6	Wk 7	Wk 8	Wk 9	Wk 10	Wk 11	Wk 12	Final
Chattanooga	Stats	7	10	10	8	8	6	6	5	4	3	8	8	7	
Chattanooga	C	8	12	12	9	8	6	6	5	4	3	9	9	8	
The Citadel	Stats	–	–	RV	–	–	–	RV	RV	RV	25	21	25	18	
The Citadel	C	–	–	–	–	–	–	–	RV	RV	22	20	24	18	
Furman	Stats	RV	RV	–	RV	RV	RV	RV	RV	RV	–	–	–	–	
Furman	C	RV	RV	–	RV	RV	RV	RV	RV	–	RV	–	–	–	
Mercer	Stats	RV	–	–	–	–	–	–	–	–	–	–	–	–	
Mercer	C	–	–	–	–	–	–	–	–	–	–	–	–	–	
Samford	Stats	RV	RV	RV	RV	RV	RV	RV	–	–	–	–	–	–	
Samford	C	RV	RV	RV	RV	RV	RV	RV	–	–	–	–	–	–	
VMI	Stats	–	–	–	–	–	–	–	–	–	–	–	–	–	
VMI	C	–	–	–	–	–	–	–	–	–	–	–	–	–	
Western Carolina	Stats	RV	RV	–	–	–	RV	RV	RV	RV	RV	RV	RV	RV	
Western Carolina	C	RV	RV	–	–	–	–	–	–	–	–	RV	RV	RV	
Wofford	Stats	–	–	RV	–	–	RV	–	–	–	–	–	–	–	
Wofford	C	–	–	–	–	–	–	–	–	–	–	–	–	–	

== Regular season ==
Index to colors and formatting
SoCon member won
SoCon member lost
SoCon teams in **bold**

All times Eastern time.

Rankings reflect that of the Sports Network poll for that week.

=== Week One ===
Date	Time	Visiting team	Home team	Site	Broadcast	Result	Attendance	Reference
September 3	7:00 PM	Central Arkansas	**Samford**	Seibert Stadium • Homewood, AL	ESPN3	**W** 45–16	6,259	
September 3	7:00 PM	**VMI**	Ball State	Scheumann Stadium • Muncie, IN	ESPN3	**L** 36–48	10,473	
September 5	12:30 PM	**Wofford**	Clemson	Memorial Clemson • Clemson, SC	RSN	**L** 10–49	81,345	
September 5	5:00 PM	**Mercer**	Austin Peay	Governors Stadium • Clarskville, TN	GovTV	**W** 28–7	5,814	
September 5	6:00 PM	Jacksonville State	**Chattanooga**	Finley Stadium • Chattanooga, TN	SDN	**L** 20–23	15,842	
September 5	6:00 PM	Davidson	**The Citadel**	Johnson Hagood Stadium • Charleston, SC	ESPN3	**W** 69–0	8,665	
September 5	7:00 PM	Coastal Carolina	**Furman**	Paladin Stadium • Greenville, SC	ESPN3	**L** 35–38	6,563	
September 5	7:00 PM	Mars Hill	**Western Carolina**	E. J. Whitmire Stadium • Cullowhee, NC	SDN	**W** 42–14	12,348	

Players of the week:

Offensive		Defensive		Special teams	
Player	Team	Player	Team	Player	Team
Michael Eubank	Samford	Tevin Floyd	The Citadel	Henrique Ribeiro	Chattanooga
**Reference: Weekly Release**

=== Week Two ===
Date	Time	Visiting team	Home team	Site	Broadcast	Result	Attendance	Reference
September 12	1:00 PM	Mars Hill	**Chattanooga**	Finley Stadium • Chattanooga, TN	SDN	**W** 44–34	9,491	
September 12	1:30 PM	Morehead State	**VMI**	Alumni Memorial Field • Lexington, VA	ESPN3	**W** 43–40	5,016	
September 12	2:00 PM	Florida A&M	**Samford**	Seibert Stadium • Homewood, AL	ESPN3	**W** 58–21	4,714	
September 12	3:30 PM	**Furman**	Virginia Tech	Lane Stadium • Blacksburg, VA	ESPN3	**L** 3–42	60,118	
September 12	6:00 PM	**Western Carolina**	**The Citadel**	Johnson Hagood Stadium • Charleston, SC	ESPN3	**CIT** 28–10	8,048	
September 12	6:00 PM	Stetson	**Mercer**	Moye Complex • Macon, GA	ESPN3	**W** 57–14	11,267	
September 12	7:00 PM	Tennessee Tech	**Wofford**	Gibbs Stadium • Spartanburg, SC	SDN	**W** 34–14	6,834	

Players of the week:

Offensive		Defensive		Special teams	
Player	Team	Player	Team	Player	Team
John Russ	Mercer	Justin Cooper	Samford	Dillon Christopher	VMI
**Reference: Weekly Release**

=== Week Three ===
Date	Time	Visiting team	Home team	Site	Broadcast	Result	Attendance	Reference
September 19	2:30 PM	Chattanooga	**Samford**	Seibert Stadium • Homewood, AL	ASN	**UTC** 31–21	9,088	
September 19	5:00 PM	Wofford	Idaho	Kibbie Dome • Moscow, ID	ESPN3	**L** 38–41	11,633	
September 19	6:00 PM	The Citadel	Georgia Southern	Paulson Stadium • Statesboro, GA	ESPN3	**L** 13–48	24,872	
September 19	6:00 PM	Furman	UCF	Bright House Networks Stadium • Orlando, FL	ESPN3	**W** 16–15	36,484	
September 19	6:00 PM	VMI	Richmond	Robins Stadium • Richmond, VA		**L** 10–42	8,700	
September 19	7:00 PM	Mercer	Tennessee Tech	Tucker Stadium • Cookeville, TN	WCTE	**L** 22–29	9,028	
September 19	7:00 PM	Western Carolina	Tennessee	Neyland Stadium • Knoxville, TN	ESPNU	**L** 10–55	102,136	

Players of the week:

Offensive		Defensive		Special teams	
Player	Team	Player	Team	Player	Team
Jacob Huesman	Chattanooga	Trey Robinson	Furman	John Croft Hollingsworth	Furman
**Reference: Weekly Release**

=== Week Four ===
Date	Time	Visiting team	Home team	Site	Broadcast	Result	Attendance	Reference
September 26	3:00 PM	**VMI**	**Furman**	Paladin Stadium • Greenville, SC	ESPN3	**FUR** 24–21	7,915	
September 26	6:00 PM	Charleston Southern	**The Citadel**	Johnson Hagood Stadium • Charleston, SC	ESPN3	**L** 20–33	11,918	
September 26	6:00 PM	**Samford**	Louisville	Papa John's Cardinal Stadium • Louisville, KY	ESPN3	**L** 3–45	50,121	
September 26	7:00 PM	**Chattanooga**	Presbyterian	Bailey Memorial Stadium • Clinton, SC	BSN	**W** 21–0	3,582	
September 26	7:00 PM	Gardner–Webb	**Wofford**	Gibbs Stadium • Spartanburg, SC	SDN	**W** 16–0	6,932	

Players of the week:

Offensive		Defensive		Special teams	
Player	Team	Player	Team	Player	Team
Jacob Huesman	Chattanooga	Kelonta Davis	Chattanooga	Brian Ross	Furman
**Reference: Weekly Release**

=== Week Five ===
Date	Time	Visiting team	Home team	Site	Broadcast	Result	Attendance	Reference
October 3	1:30 PM	Bucknell	**VMI**	Alumni Memorial Field • Lexington, VA	ESPN3	**L** 22–28^{OT}	3,713	
October 3	3:30 PM	Presbyterian	**Western Carolina**	E. J. Whitmire Stadium • Cullowhee, NC	WMYA	**W** 33–21	9,191	
October 3	6:00 PM	**Wofford**	**Mercer**	Moye Complex • Macon, GA	ESPN3	**WOF** 33–34^{OT}	10,489	
October 3	7:00 PM	South Carolina State	**Furman**	Paladin Stadium • Greenville, SC	ESPN3	**W** 17–3	1,022	

Players of the week:

Offensive		Defensive		Special teams	
Player	Team	Player	Team	Player	Team
Detrez Newsome	Western Carolina	Drake Michaelson	Wofford	Logan Howard	Western Carolina
**Reference: Weekly Release**

=== Week Six ===
Date	Time	Visiting team	Home team	Site	Broadcast	Result	Attendance	Reference
October 10	1:00 PM	**Furman**	**Chattanooga**	Finley Stadium • Chattanooga, TN	ESPN3	**UTC** 31–3	7,630	
October 10	1:30 PM	**Samford**	**VMI**	Alumni Memorial Field • Lexington, VA	ESPN3	**SAM** 49–13	4,875	
October 10	2:00 PM	**Wofford**	**The Citadel**	Johnson Hagood Stadium • Charleston, SC	ESPN3	**CIT** 39–12	10,428	
October 10	3:30 PM	**Mercer**	**Western Carolina**	E. J. Whitmire Stadium • Cullowhee, NC	SDN	**WCU** 21–24	8,479	

Players of the week:

Offensive		Defensive		Special teams	
Player	Team	Player	Team	Player	Team
Michael Eubank	Samford	Tevin Floyd	The Citadel	Henrique Ribeiro	Chattanooga
**Reference: Weekly Release**

=== Week Seven ===
Date	Time	Visiting team	Home team	Site	Broadcast	Result	Attendance	Reference
October 17	1:30 PM	**Chattanooga**	**VMI**	Alumni Memorial Field • Lexington, VA	ESPN3	**UTC** 33–27	6,104	
October 17	2:00 PM	**Western Carolina**	**Wofford**	Gibbs Stadium • Spartanburg, SC	ESPN3	**WCU** 24–17	7,344	
October 17	3:00 PM	**The Citadel**	**Samford**	Seibert Stadium • Homewood, AL	ESPN3	**CIT** 44–25	4,927	
October 17	4:00 PM	East Tennessee State	**Mercer**	Moye Complex • Macon, GA	ESPN3	**W** 52–0	10,200	

Players of the week:

Offensive		Defensive		Special teams	
Player	Team	Player	Team	Player	Team
Karel Hamilton	Samford	Dee Delaney	The Citadel	Henrique Ribeiro	Chattanooga
**Reference: Weekly Release**

=== Week Eight ===
Date	Time	Visiting team	Home team	Site	Broadcast	Result	Attendance	Reference
October 24	1:30 PM	**Chattanooga**	**Wofford**	Gibbs Stadium • Spartanburg, SC	SDN	**UTC** 20–17	8,713	
October 24	1:30 PM	**The Citadel**	**Furman**	Paladin Stadium • Greenville, SC	ESPN3	**CIT** 38–17	12,124	
October 24	3:00 PM	**VMI**	**Mercer**	Moye Complex • Macon, GA	ESPN3	**VMI** 28–21	10,200	
October 24	3:30 PM	**Samford**	**Western Carolina**	E. J. Whitmire Stadium • Cullowhee, NC	SDN	**WCU** 56–36	12,014	

Players of the week:

Offensive		Defensive		Special teams	
Player	Team	Player	Team	Player	Team
Aaron Sanders	VMI	Daniel Riddle	Western Carolina	Henrique Ribeiro	Chattanooga
**Reference: Weekly Release**

=== Week Nine ===
Date	Time	Visiting team	Home team	Site	Broadcast	Result	Attendance	Reference
October 31	1:30 PM	**Wofford**	**VMI**	Alumni Memorial Field • Lexington, VA	ESPN3	**WOF** 41–20	4,437	
October 31	2:00 PM	**Western Carolina**	**Chattanooga**	Finley Stadium • Chattanooga, TN	ESPN3	**UTC** 41–13	11,495	
October 31	2:00 PM	**Mercer**	**The Citadel**	Johnson Hagood Stadium • Charleston, SC	ESPN3	**CIT** 21–19	10,006	
October 31	3:00 PM	**Furman**	**Samford**	Seibert Stadium • Homewood, AL	SDN	**FUR** 20–17	4,013	

Players of the week:

Offensive		Defensive		Special teams	
Player	Team	Player	Team	Player	Team
Jacob Huesman	Chattanooga	Cory Magwood	Furman	Jon Croft Hollingsworth	Furman
**Reference: Weekly Release**

=== Week Ten ===
Date	Time	Visiting team	Home team	Site	Broadcast	Result	Attendance	Reference
November 7	2:00 PM	**VMI**	**The Citadel**	Johnson Hagood Stadium • Charleston, SC	ESPN3	**CIT** 35–14	14,925	
November 7	2:00 PM	Clark Atlanta	**Samford**	Seibert Stadium • Homewood, AL	ESPN3	**W** 43–0	4,264	
November 7	3:30 PM	**Furman**	**Western Carolina**	E. J. Whitmire Stadium • Cullowhee, NC	SDN	**WCU** 48–10	8,561	
November 7	4:00 PM	**Chattanooga**	**Mercer**	Moye Complex • Macon, GA	ESPN3	**MER** 17–14	9,527	

Players of the week:

Offensive		Defensive		Special teams	
Player	Team	Player	Team	Player	Team
Troy Mitchell	Western Carolina	Quinlan Washington	The Citadel	Anthony Pistelli	Samford
**Reference: Weekly Release**

=== Week Eleven ===
Date	Time	Visiting team	Home team	Site	Broadcast	Result	Attendance	Reference
November 14	1:30 PM	**Mercer**	**Furman**	Paladin Stadium • Greenville, SC	ESPN3	**MER** 27–20	6,351	
November 14	1:30 PM	**Samford**	**Wofford**	Gibbs Stadium • Spartanburg, SC	ESPN3	**SAM** 37–27	5,077	
November 14	2:00 PM	**The Citadel**	**Chattanooga**	Finley Stadium • Chattanooga, TN	SDN	**UTC** 31–23	11,594	
November 14	7:00 PM	**Western Carolina**	Texas A&M	Kyle Field • College Station, TX	ESPNU	**L** 17–41	101,583	

Players of the week:

Offensive		Defensive		Special teams	
Player	Team	Player	Team	Player	Team
Jacob Huesman	Chattanooga	Zach Jackson	Mercer	Anthony Pistelli	Samford
**Reference: Weekly Release**

=== Week Twelve ===
Date	Time	Visiting team	Home team	Site	Broadcast	Result	Attendance	Reference
November 21	12:00 PM	**The Citadel**	South Carolina	Williams-Brice Stadium • Columbia, SC	SECN Alt.	**W** 23–22	77,241	
November 21	1:30 PM	**Western Carolina**	**VMI**	Alumni Memorial Field • Lexington, VA	ESPN3	**WCU** 24–20	4,523	
November 21	3:00 PM	**Chattanooga**	Florida State	Doak Campbell Stadium • Tallahassee, FL	ACCRSN	**L** 13–52	66,412	
November 21	3:00 PM	**Samford**	**Mercer**	Moye Complex • Macon, GA	ESPN3	**SAM** 47–21	10,200	
November 21	3:30 PM	**Furman**	**Wofford**	Gibbs Stadium • Spartanburg, SC	ASN	**WOF** 38–28	7,143	

Players of the week:

Offensive		Defensive		Special teams	
Player	Team	Player	Team	Player	Team
Tyler Renew	The Citadel	Daniel Riddle	Western Carolina	Anthony Pistelli	Samford
**Reference: Weekly Release**

=== Week Thirteen ===
Date	Time	Visiting team	Home team	Site	Broadcast	Result	Attendance	Reference
November 28	1:00 PM	Fordham	**Chattanooga**	Finley Stadium • Chattanooga, TN	ESPN3	**W** 50–20	4,888	
November 28	2:00 PM	**The Citadel**	Coastal Carolina	Brooks Stadium • Conway, SC	ESPN3	**W** 41–38	6,751	

=== Week Fourteen ===
Date	Time	Visiting team	Home team	Site	Broadcast	Result	Attendance	Reference
December 5	1:00 PM	**The Citadel**	Charleston Southern	Buccaneer Field • North Charleston, SC	ESPN3			
December 5	2:00 PM	**Chattanooga**	Jacksonville State	Burgess-Snow Field at JSU Stadium • Jacksonville, AL	ESPN3			

== Records against other conferences ==
=== FCS conferences ===
Conference	Record
Big Sky	0–0
Big South	3–3
CAA	0–1
Ivy League	0–0
Independents	1–0
MEAC	2–0
MVFC	0–0
NEC	0–0
OVC	2–2
Patriot	2–0
Pioneer	3–0
Southland	1–0
SWAC	0–0
Total	14–6

=== FBS conferences ===
Conference	Record
American	1–0
ACC	0–4
Big 12	0–0
Independents	0–0
MAC	0–1
SEC	1–2
Sun Belt	0–2
Total	2–9

== Attendance ==
Team	Stadium	Capacity	Game 1	Game 2	Game 3	Game 4	Game 5	Game 6	Total	Average	% of Capacity
Chattanooga	Finley Stadium	20,668	15,812	9,491	7,630	11,495	11,594	4,888	60,910	10,152	49%
The Citadel	Johnson Hagood Stadium	21,000	8,665	8,048	11,918	10,428	10,006	14,925	63,990	10,665	51%
Furman	Paladin Stadium	16,000	6,563	7,915	1,022	12,124	6,351		33,975	6,795	42%
Mercer	Moye Complex	10,200	11,267	10,489	10,200	10,200	9,527	10,200	61,883	10,314	101%
Samford	Seibert Stadium	6,700	6,259	4,714	9,088	4,927	4,013	4,264	33,265	5,544	83%
VMI	Alumni Memorial Field	10,000	5,016	3,713	4,875	6,104	4,437	4,523	28,668	4,778	48%
Western Carolina	E. J. Whitmire Stadium	13,742	12,348	9,191	8,479	12,014	8,561		50,593	10,119	74%
Wofford	Gibbs Stadium	13,000	6,834	6,932	7,344	8,713	5,077	7,143	42,043	7,007	54%

== NFL draft ==
The following list includes all SoCon players who were drafted in the 2016 NFL draft.

Round #	Pick #	NFL team	Player	Position	College
2	62	Carolina Panthers	James Bradberry	CB	Samford
