= Huesman =

Huesman is a surname. Notable people with the surname include:

- Jacob Huesman (born 1993), American football player
- Russ Huesman (born 1960), American football coach
