= 2015 VMI Keydets football team =

American college football season

2015 VMI Keydets football
- Conference: Southern Conference
- Record: 2–9 (1–6 SoCon)
- Head coach: Scott Wachenheim (1st season)
- Offensive coordinator: Dustin Ward (1st season)
- Offensive scheme: Pro-style
- Defensive coordinator: Tom Clark (1st season)
- Base defense: 3–4
- Home stadium: Alumni Memorial Field

2015 Southern Conference football standings
	Conf.			Overall
Team	W		L	W		L
No. 9 Chattanooga +^	6	–	1	9	–	4
No. 13 The Citadel +^	6	–	1	9	–	4
Western Carolina	5	–	2	7	–	4
Samford	3	–	4	6	–	5
Wofford	3	–	4	5	–	6
Mercer	2	–	5	5	–	6
Furman	2	–	5	4	–	7
VMI	1	–	6	2	–	9
+ – Conference co-champions; ^ – FCS playoff participant; Rankings from STATS Poll

The 2015 VMI Keydets football team represented the Virginia Military Institute in the 2015 NCAA Division I FCS football season. It was VMI's 125th football season and the Keydets were led by first year head coach Scott Wachenheim. They played their home games at 10,000–seat Alumni Memorial Field at Foster Stadium, as they have since 1962. This was VMI's second season as a member of the Southern Conference, following 11 seasons in the Big South Conference, which followed 78 years in the Southern Conference. They finished the season 2–9, 1–6 in SoCon play to finish in last place.

== Schedule ==
VMI released its schedule on February 3, 2015. The schedule features six home games and five road contests. VMI will face Ball State on the road in the season opener on a Thursday night. The home opener will be September 12 against Pioneer League member Morehead State. The Keydets will play one team from the commonwealth of Virginia, Richmond, after not playing a team from Virginia in 2014. VMI will host conference rivals Samford, Chattanooga, Wofford, and Western Carolina, and will travel to Furman, Mercer, and The Citadel.

Date	Time	Opponent	Site	TV	Result	Attendance
September 3	7:00 pm	at Ball State*	Scheumann Stadium; Muncie, IN	ESPN3	L 36–48	10,473
September 12	1:30 pm	Morehead State*	Alumni Memorial Field; Lexington, VA	ESPN3	W 43–40	5,016
September 19	6:00 pm	at No. 22 Richmond*	E. Claiborne Robins Stadium; Richmond, VA (rivalry)	CSN MA+	L 10–42	8,700
September 26	3:00 pm	at Furman	Paladin Stadium; Greenville, SC	ESPN3	L 21–24	7,915
October 3	1:30 pm	Bucknell*	Alumni Memorial Field; Lexington, VA	ESPN3	L 22–28 ^{OT}	3,713
October 10	1:30 pm	Samford^{†}	Alumni Memorial Field; Lexington, VA	ESPN3	L 13–49	4,875
October 17	1:30 pm	No. 6 Chattanooga	Alumni Memorial Field; Lexington, VA	ESPN3	L 27–33	6,104
October 24	3:00 pm	at Mercer	Moye Complex; Macon, GA	ESPN3	W 28–21	9,754
October 31	1:30 pm	Wofford	Alumni Memorial Field; Lexington, VA	ESPN3	L 20–41	4,437
November 7	2:00 pm	at No. 25 The Citadel	Johnson Hagood Stadium; Charleston, SC (Military Classic of the South)	ESPN3	L 14–35	14,925
November 21	1:30 pm	Western Carolina	Alumni Memorial Field; Lexington, VA	ESPN3	L 20–24	4,523
*Non-conference game; ^{†}Homecoming; Rankings from STATS Poll released prior to the game; All times are in Eastern time

== Game summaries ==
=== Ball State ===
Quarter	1	2	3	4	Total
VMI	0	10	7	19	36
Ball State	3	17	14	14	48

at Scheumann Stadium (Muncie, IN)

- Date: September 3, 2015
- Game time: 7:00 PM
- Game weather: Temperature: 85 • Wind: WNW 5 mph • Weather: Sunny
- Game attendance: 10,473
- Referee: Tony Cannella
- TV: ESPN3

=== Morehead State ===
Quarter	1	2	3	4	Total
Morehead State	14	3	13	10	40
VMI	8	15	10	10	43

at Alumni Memorial Field (Lexington, VA)

- Date: September 12, 2015
- Game time: 1:30 PM
- Game attendance: 5,016
- Referee: Thomas Graham
- TV: ESPN3

=== Richmond ===
Quarter	1	2	3	4	Total
VMI	3	7	0	0	10
#22 Richmond	7	14	14	7	42

at Robins Stadium (Richmond, VA)

- Date: September 19, 2015
- Game time: 6:00 PM
- Game attendance: 8,700
- Referee: Hank Johns
- TV: CSN MA+

=== Furman ===
Quarter	1	2	3	4	Total
VMI	7	7	0	7	21
Furman	0	7	14	3	24

at Paladin Stadium (Greenville, SC)

- Date: September 26, 2015
- Game time: 3:00 PM
- Game weather: Temperature: 66 • Wind: SW 13 mph • Weather: Light Rain
- Game attendance: 7,915
- Referee: Marshall Lewis
- TV: ESPN3

=== Bucknell ===
Quarter	1	2	3	4	OT	Total
Bucknell	7	0	0	15	6	28
VMI	7	6	0	9	0	22

at Alumni Memorial Field (Lexington, VA)

- Game time: 1:30 PM
- Game weather: Temperature: 52 • Wind: 8 mph • Weather: Cold, Rainy, Ick
- Game attendance: 3,713
- Referee: Bob Johnson
- TV: ESPN3

=== Samford ===
Quarter	1	2	3	4	Total
Samford	7	14	7	21	49
VMI	0	10	3	0	13

at Alumni Memorial Field (Lexington, VA)

- Game time: 1:30 PM
- Game weather: Temperature: 51 • Wind: 6–8 mph • Weather: Vintage fall day
- Game attendance: 4,875
- Referee: Edwin Lee
- TV: ESPN3

=== Chattanooga ===
Quarter	1	2	3	4	Total
#6 Chattanooga	3	17	3	10	33
VMI	7	14	0	6	27

at Alumni Memorial Field (Lexington, VA)

- Game time: 1:30 PM
- Game weather: Temperature: 58 • Wind: 8–12 MPH • Weather: Cool and gorgeous
- Game attendance: 6,104
- Referee: Marshall Lewis
- TV: ESPN3

=== Mercer ===
Quarter	1	2	3	4	Total
VMI	14	14	0	0	28
Mercer	0	14	7	0	21

at Moye Complex (Macon, GA)

- Game time: 3:00 PM
- Game weather: Temperature: 81 • Wind: 4 mph • Weather: Partly Sunny
- Game attendance: 9,754
- Referee: Larry Saunders
- TV: ESPN3

=== Wofford ===
Quarter	1	2	3	4	Total
Wofford	7	7	21	6	41
VMI	7	3	7	3	20

at Alumni Memorial Field (Lexington, VA)

- Game time: 1:30 PM
- Game attendance: 4,473
- TV: ESPN3

=== The Citadel ===
Quarter	1	2	3	4	Total
VMI	7	0	7	0	14
#25 The Citadel	14	6	6	9	35

at Johnson Hagood Stadium (Charleston, SC)

- Game time: 2:00 PM
- Game attendance: 14,925
- TV: ESPN3

=== Western Carolina ===
Quarter	1	2	3	4	Total
Western Carolina	0	7	7	10	24
VMI	7	6	0	7	20

at Alumni Memorial Field (Lexington, VA)

- Game time: 1:30 PM
- Game attendance: 4,523
- TV: ESPN3

== Personnel ==
=== Coaching staff ===
VMI will be led by first-year head coach Scott Wachenheim, a native of California and a 1984 graduate of the United States Air Force Academy. Wachenheim was previously the offensive line coach at Virginia under head coach Mike London. He replaces Sparky Woods, who compiled a 17–62 record in seven seasons at VMI. Shortly following a home loss to The Citadel, VMI chose not to renew Woods' contract, and several weeks later announced the hire of Wachenheim.

Wachenheim introduced an almost entirely new coaching staff his first year on post. Coordinating the offense is Dustin Ward, while the defensive coordinator is Tom Clark who served two stints at William & Mary as a defensive coordinator and defensive backs coach. There were only two holdovers from Woods' staff: wide receivers and tight ends coach Brad Robbins, and linebackers coach Justin Hamilton, a 2006 graduate of Virginia Tech. Also new to the staff is running backs coach Tim Maypray, who played football at VMI and graduated in 2010 before a brief stint in the Canadian Football League.

Name	Position	Seasons at VMI	Alma mater
Scott Wachenheim	Head coach	1st	Air Force (1984)
Dustin Ward	Offensive coordinator	1st	Illinois (2003)
Tom Clark	Defensive coordinator/Secondary	1st	Maryland (1986)
Tim Maypray	Running Backs	1st	VMI (2010)
Justin Wood	Inside Linebackers	1st	Christopher Newport (2006)
Justin Hamilton	outside linebackers	2nd	Virginia Tech
Brad Robbins	Wide receivers	3rd	UVA–Wise (2010)
Gordon Sammis	Offensive line	1st	Virginia (2007)
Mike Saint Germain	Defensive Line	1st	Lafayette (2007)
Josh Zidenberg	Asst. Secondary/Special Teams	1st	Virginia (2008)
Jimmy Whitten	Strength & Conditioning	12th	Virginia Tech (1991)

=== Roster ===
2015 VMI Keydets football team roster
Players
Coaches
Offense

Pos.	#	Name	Class
QB	4	John Burton	Jr
QB	4	Jake Paladino	Fr
WR	6	Dane Forlines	Jr
QB	8	Al Cobb	So
WR	9	Taylor Stout	Jr
WR	11	Darrian Johnson	Jr
TE	13	Ryan Swingle	So
WR	15	Joey Brown	So
QB	16	Jade Maher	So
RB	17	Brice Tucker	So
QB	18	Austin Coulling	Fr
WR	21	Aaron Sanders	Jr
WR	22	Dontae Mauck	Fr
FB	23	Cody Shirley	Jr
RB	24	Quan Myers	Fr
RB	26	Mason Dermott	Fr
RB	37	Chris Gavin	Fr
FB	39	Derrick Ziglar	Sr
RB	40	Hunter Marshall	So
WR	43	Kyle Harrell	So
TE	47	Zander Royston	Fr
WR	48	John Wilkins	Jr
RB	49	Kyle Vardo	So
C	50	Chase Smith	So
G	57	Bradley Hann	Jr
OT	61	Stephen Miller	So
C	62	Patrick Doucette	So
G	63	Nate Murray	Sr
G	65	Matt Milner	So
OT	66	Iyan Roseborough	Jr
OT	71	Christian Williams	So
OT	72	Andrew Lewis	Jr
OL	73	Cole Brummit	Fr
OL	76	Will Morris	Fr
OL	77	Tyler Thacker	Fr
G	78	Chad Reed	Jr
OL	79	Garrett Barker	Fr
WR	80	Samuel Patterson	Sr
TE	81	Chad Jacob	Jr
WR	82	Matthew Nicholson	Jr
WR	83	Isaiah Parker	Fr
TE	85	Kevin Carson	So
TE	86	John Mobley	So
WR	89	Will Wampler	Fr

Defense

Pos.	#	Name	Class
CB	1	Caleb Furlow	Sr
LB	2	Bradley Lipscomb	Jr
LB	3	Tony Richardson	So
LB	5	Darnell Ashton	Jr
CB	7	Damian Jones	Jr
S	14	Greg Sanders	So
CB	19	Doug Moore	Sr
S	20	Alex James	Sr
S	25	Alex Keys	Jr
DB	28	John Porter	Fr
DB	29	Karee Carter	Fr
DB	30	Gabe Sutherland	So
DB	31	Eddie Stawowczyk	So
DB	32	John Strozyk	So
CB	33	Tyruig Trotman	Fr
LB/P	34	Bill Hogan	So
DB	35	Scott Frazier	So
CB	36	Michael Williams	So
S	38	Alijah Robinson	Jr
DB	41	Uzoma Kpaduwa	Fr
LB	42	Troy Barden	So
LB	44	Ryan Francis	Jr
LB	45	Tyler Fedison	Fr
LB	46	Allan Cratsenberg	So
DE	52	Zack Baker	So
LB	53	Arnold Roots	Fr
DL	55	Daniel Rader	So
LB	56	Brian Ellis	Jr
LB	58	Brian Lipscomb	So
LB	59	Chris Copeland	Sr
DL	60	Thad Stevenson-Panchisin	Fr
LB	67	Derek Wilson	Fr
LB	68	Brad Mallory	Fr
LB	69	Jameson Donahue	Fr
DL	73	Connor Mildrum	Jr
DB	84	Mandela Kabi	Fr
LB	87	Cody Peregoy	Fr
DE	88	J. C. Garvin	Jr
DE	90	Robert de Wolff	Jr
DL	91	Xavier Greenfield	So
DT	92	Walker Hays	Jr
DT	93	Denton Ensminger	Sr
DT	94	Amon-Ra Clay	So
DL	95	Shavon Henderson	So
LB	96	Seth Mallory	Jr
DE	97	Jarrod Richmond	Fr
DL	98	Casey Phillips	Fr
DE	99	Joe Nelson	Jr

Special teams

Pos.	#	Name	Class
P/QB	12	Hayden Alford	Jr
PK	27	Dillon Christopher	Jr
PK	64	Tommy Smith	Fr

Head coach

- Scott Wachenheim – 1st year

Coordinators/assistant coaches

- Dustin Ward (Offensive Coordinator – 1st year
- Tom Clark (Defensive coordinator/Secondary) – 1st year
- Tim Maypray (Running Backs) – 1st year
- Justin Wood (Inside Linebackers) – 1st year
- Justin Hamilton (Outside Linebackers) – 2nd year
- Brad Robbins (Wide Receivers) – 3rd year
- Gordon Sammis (Offensive Line) – 1st year
- Josh Zidenberg (Secondary) – 1st year
- Mike Saint Germain (Defensive Line) – 1st year
- Jimmy Whitten (Strength & Conditioning) – 12th year

Legend

- (C) Team captain
- (S) Suspended
- (I) Ineligible
- Injured
- Redshirt

Roster
Last update: August 27, 2015

=== Returning starters ===
==== Offense ====
Player	Class	Position
Al Cobb	R–Sophomore	Quarterback
Pat Doucette	Sophomore	Offensive Line
Bradley Hann	R–Junior	Offensive Line
Andrew Lewis	Junior	Offensive Line
Nate Murray	R–Senior	Offensive Line
Derrick Ziglar	R–Senior	Running Back
Matthew Nicholson	Junior	Wide Receiver
Sam Patterson	Senior	Wide Receiver
Aaron Sanders	Junior	Wide Receiver

==== Defense ====
Player	Class	Position
Damian Jones	R–Junior	Cornerback
Denton Ensminger	Senior	Defensive Line
Joe Nelson	R–Sophomore	Defensive Line
Ryan Francis	R–Sophomore	Linebacker
Allan Cratsenberg	Sophomore	Linebacker
Alex Keys	R–Junior	Safety
Alijah Robinson	Junior	Safety

==== Special teams ====
Player	Class	Position
Dillon Christopher	Junior	Placekicker
Hayden Alford	R–Junior	Punter
Dane Forlines	Junior	Punt returner
Taylor Stout; Dane Forlines	Junior; Junior	Kick returner
