= 2015 The Citadel Bulldogs football team =

American college football season

2015 The Citadel Bulldogs football

SoCon co-champion

FCS playoffs second round, L 6–14 vs. Charleston Southern
- Conference: Southern Conference

Ranking
- STATS: No. 13
- FCS Coaches: No. 15
- Record: 9–4 (6–1 SoCon)
- Head coach: Mike Houston (2nd season)
- Offensive coordinator: Brent Thompson (2nd season)
- Offensive scheme: Triple option
- Defensive coordinator: Maurice Drayton (2nd season)
- Base defense: 4–3
- Home stadium: Johnson Hagood Stadium

2015 Southern Conference football standings
	Conf.			Overall
Team	W		L	W		L
No. 9 Chattanooga +^	6	–	1	9	–	4
No. 13 The Citadel +^	6	–	1	9	–	4
Western Carolina	5	–	2	7	–	4
Samford	3	–	4	6	–	5
Wofford	3	–	4	5	–	6
Mercer	2	–	5	5	–	6
Furman	2	–	5	4	–	7
VMI	1	–	6	2	–	9
+ – Conference co-champions; ^ – FCS playoff participant; Rankings from STATS Poll

The 2015 The Citadel Bulldogs football team represented The Citadel, The Military College of South Carolina in the 2015 NCAA Division I FCS football season. The Bulldogs were led by second-year head coach Mike Houston and played their home games at Johnson Hagood Stadium. They played as members of the Southern Conference, as they have since 1936. They finished the season 9–4, 6–1 in SoCon play to finish in a share for the SoCon title with Chattanooga. Due to their head-to-head loss to Chattanooga, they did not receive the SoCon's automatic bid to the FCS Playoffs. However, they received an at-large bid to the FCS Playoffs where they defeated Coastal Carolina in the first round before losing in the second round to Charleston Southern.

On January 18, head coach Mike Houston resigned to become the head coach at James Madison. He finished at The Citadel with a two-year record of 14–11.

== Before the season ==
=== Returning starters ===
Ten starters returned on offense, with only QB Aaron Miller lost to graduation.

=== Outlook ===
The Bulldogs were picked to finish 7th in the 8 team Southern Conference. No players were named to national award watch lists or the preseason All-America teams, but OL Sam Frye and DL Mitchell Jeter were named to the preseason All-Conference first team.

== Schedule ==
Date	Time	Opponent	Rank	Site	TV	Result	Attendance
September 5	6:00 p.m.	Davidson*		Johnson Hagood Stadium; Charleston, SC	ESPN3	W 69–0	8,665
September 12	6:00 p.m.	Western Carolina		Johnson Hagood Stadium; Charleston, SC	ESPN3	W 28–10	8,048
September 19	6:00 p.m.	at Georgia Southern*		Paulson Stadium; Statesboro, GA	ESPN3	L 13–48	24,872
September 26	6:00 p.m.	Charleston Southern*		Johnson Hagood Stadium; Charleston, SC	ESPN3	L 20–33	11,918
October 10	2:00 p.m.	Wofford		Johnson Hagood Stadium; Charleston, SC (rivalry)	ESPN3	W 39–12	10,428
October 17	3:00 p.m.	at Samford		Seibert Stadium; Homewood, AL	ESPN3	W 44–25	4,927
October 24	1:30 p.m.	at Furman		Paladin Stadium; Greenville, SC (rivalry)	ESPN3	W 38–17	12,124
October 31	2:00 p.m.	Mercer		Johnson Hagood Stadium; Charleston, SC	ESPN3	W 21–19	10,006
November 7	2:00 p.m.	VMI^{†}	No. 25	Johnson Hagood Stadium; Charleston, SC (Military Classic of the South)	ESPN3	W 35–14	14,925
November 14	2:00 p.m.	at No. 8 Chattanooga	No. 21	Finley Stadium; Chattanooga, TN	SDN	L 23–31	11,594
November 21	12:00 p.m.	at South Carolina*	No. 25	Williams–Brice Stadium; Columbia, SC	SECN Alt.	W 23–22	77,241
November 28	2:00 p.m.	at No. 10 Coastal Carolina*	No. 18	Brooks Stadium; Conway, SC (NCAA Division I first round)	ESPN3	W 41–38	6,751
December 5	1:00 p.m.	at No. 9 Charleston Southern*	No. 18	Buccaneer Field; North Charleston, SC (NCAA Division I second round)	ESPN3	L 6–14	8,451
*Non-conference game; ^{†}Homecoming; Rankings from STATS Poll released prior to the game; All times are in Eastern time

== Personnel ==
=== Roster ===
2015 The Citadel Bulldogs football team roster
Players
Coaches
Offense

Pos.	#	Name	Class
WR	2	DeAndre Schoultz	Jr
WR	3	Jorian Jordan	Jr
QB	6	Dane Anderson	Jr
QB	10	Jordan Black	Fr
QB	12	Shon Belton	Fr
RB	13	Jalen Lampkin	Fr
RB	16	Vinny Miller	Sr
QB	18	Cam Jackson	So
QB	19	Dominique Allen	So
RB	25	Reggie Williams	So
RB	26	Jonathan Dorogy	So
RB	28	Craig Miller	Jr
RB	29	Grant Drakeford	Fr
RB	30	Jauveer Hammond	Fr
RB	31	Rod Johnson	Fr
FB	34	Evan McField	Fr
FB	36	Tyler Renew	Jr
FB	37	Donovan Ward	Fr
FB	39	Isiaha Smith	So
OL	52	Ryan Bednar	Jr
OL	53	Tyler Davis	Fr
OL	56	Michael Mabry	Sr
OL	57	Kyle Weaver	Jr
OL	61	Sam Frye	Sr
OL	63	Emmet Howle	Jr
OL	64	Hugh McFaddin	So
OL	67	Zack VanAlstine	Fr
OL	69	Max Ford	Fr
OL	70	Lovequan Scott	Fr
OL	71	Nick Jeffreys	Jr
OL	73	Isaiah Pinson	So
OL	74	Sydney Martin	Fr
OL	76	Andrew Laulusa	Fr
OL	77	Tristan Harkleroad	Fr
OL	79	Greg DiCocco	Sr
WR	80	Charles Clark	Jr
WR	81	Alex Glover	Sr
WR	82	Brandon Eakins	Sr
WR	83	Rudder Brown	Jr
WR	84	Cameron Scott	Jr
WR	88	Jake Riggs	So
WR	89	Whit Miller	Fr
OL		Kirk Evans	Fr
RB		David Pascoe	Fr
OL		Mike Rentz	Fr
QB		AJ Vandiver	Fr

Defense

Pos.	#	Name	Class
DB	1	Shy Phillips	So
DB	4	Dee Delaney	So
DL	5	Joe Crochet	Jr
DL	7	Mark Thomas	Sr
LB	8	Israel Battle	So
DB	9	Khafari Buffalo	Fr
DB	11	Ben Roberts	So
LB	17	Josh Massey	So
DB	20	Mariel Cooper	Sr
DB	21	Malik Diggs	Jr
LB	22	Dondray Copeland	Jr
DB	23	Tyus Carter	So
DB	24	Aron Spann III	Fr
DB	27	Nick Willis	Sr
LB	32	Phil Davis	Fr
LB	33	Quinlan Washington	Fr
DB	38	J.J. Baldwin	Jr
DB	40	Kailik Williams	So
DB	41	Seth Greer	So
LB	42	Trey Nelson	So
LB	43	Tevin Floyd	Jr
LB	44	Jordan Thomas	Fr
DB	45	Curt Nixon	Fr
DB	46	Carl Cunningham Jr.	Fr
LB	47	Caleb Bennett	Jr
DL	48	Kevin Graham	Fr
LB	49	James Riley	Sr
LB	50	Myles Pierce	So
LB	54	DaSean Daniels	So
LB	54	Gregory Pappas	So
LB	55	Russell Hubbs	Fr
DL	58	Austin Harrell	Jr
DL	62	Mitchell Jeter	Sr
DL	68	Ken Allen	Fr
DL	78	Caleb Hester	Fr
DL	91	Tre'Von White	Fr
DL	92	Travis Johnson	So
DL	93	Adam Wawrzynski	Fr
DL	94	Attorney Gallman	Fr
DL	95	Noah Dawkins	Fr
DL	96	Ja'Lon Williams	Fr
DL	97	Jonathan King	So
DL		Bradley Carter	Fr
LB		Tradd Deaver	Fr
LB		Cody Floyd	Fr
DB		Tyler Jackson	Fr
LB		Taylor Jurney	Jr
DB		Nathan Peeples	Fr
DB		Donald Rutledge	Fr
LB		Za'Von Whitaker	Fr
LB		Jordan Williams	Fr

Special teams

Pos.	#	Name	Class
LS	59	Lee Riley	Fr
LS	60	Hunter Morris	Jr
LS	85	Patrick Keefe	Fr
K	86	Austin Jordan	Sr
P	90	Will Vanvick	Jr
K	99	Eric Goins	Jr

Head coach

- Mike Houston (2nd season)

Coordinators/assistant coaches

- Brent Thompson – Offensive Coordinator / Quarterbacks
- Blake Harrell – Special Teams Coordinator / Inside Linebackers
- Maurice Drayton – Defensive Coordinator / Cornerbacks
- J. P. Gunter - A-Backs / Recruiting Coordinator
- Ron Boyd - Offensive Line
- Brian Rucker - Wide Receivers
- Roy Tesh - Defensive Line
- Joel Taylor - Defensive Passing Game Coordinator / Safeties
- John Ward - Tackles
- Tripp Weaver - Outside Linebackers
- P. G. Standard - Offensive Quality Control
- Price Blagg - Defensive Quality Control
- Jimmy Long - Special Teams Quality Control
- Donnell Boucher - Strength and Conditioning
- Floris Mendonca - Video Coordinator
- Kate Yeager - Director of Personnel

Legend

- (C) Team captain
- (S) Suspended
- (I) Ineligible
- Injured
- Redshirt

Roster
Last update: July 1, 2020

=== Depth chart ===
Defense

S
⋅
⋅
⋅

FS
Malik Diggs
Kailik Williams
⋅

WLB	SLB
⋅	⋅
⋅	⋅
⋅	⋅

SS
⋅
⋅
⋅

CB
Dee Delaney
Tyus Carter
⋅

DE	DT	DT	DE
Mark Thomas	Jonathan King	Mitchell Jeter	Joe Crochet
Kevin Graham	Ken Allen	Austin Harrell	Noah Dawkins
Travis Johnson	⋅	⋅	Russell Hubbs

CB
Shy Phillips
Mariel Cooper
⋅

Offense

WR
Alex Glover
Rudder Brown
⋅

SB
Cam Jackson
Grant Drakeford
⋅

LT	LG	C	RG	RT
Isaiah Pinson	Kyle Weaver	Ryan Bednar	Sam Frye	Michael Mabry
Sydney Martin	Lovequan Scott	Tyler Davis	Tristan Harkleroad	Nick Jeffreys
⋅	⋅	⋅	⋅	⋅

SB
Vinny Miller
Reggie Williams
⋅

WR
Joriah Jordan
Brandon Eakins
⋅

QB
Dominique Allen
Shon Belton
Cam Jackson

FB
Tyler Renew
Isiaha Smith
Evan McField

Special teams
PK Eric Goins
PK Austin Jordan
P Will Vanvick
KR Quinlan Washington
PR DeAndre Schoultz
H Dane Anderson

== Game summaries ==
=== Davidson ===
Team	1	2	3	4	Total
Wildcats	0	0	0	0	0
• Bulldogs	21	14	20	14	69

- Date: September 5, 2015
- Location: Johnson Hagood Stadium, Charleston, SC
- Game start: 6:00 PM EST
- Game attendance: 8,665
- Television network: ESPN3

Scoring summary
1	6:08	CIT	Dominique Allen 4-yard run (Eric Goins kick)	CIT 7–0
1	0:10	CIT	Isiaha Smith 2-yard run (Goins kick)	CIT 14–0
1	0:00	CIT	Tevin Floyd 28-yard interception return (Goins kick)	CIT 21–0
2	4:11	CIT	Jorian Jordan 17-yard pass from Allen (Goins kick)	CIT 28–0
2	0:31	CIT	Smith 8-yard run (Goins kick)	CIT 35–0
3	11:26	CIT	Rod Johnson 1-yard run (Goins kick)	CIT 42–0
3	6:46	CIT	Allen 2-yard run (Goins kick)	CIT 48–0
3	1:33	CIT	Smith 1-yard run (Pass conversion failed)	CIT 55–0
4	12:27	CIT	Evan McField 15-yard run (Austin Jordan kick)	CIT 62–0
4	8:16	CIT	Shon Belton 48-yard run (Jordan kick)	CIT 69–0

=== Western Carolina ===
Team	1	2	3	4	Total
Catamounts	0	3	7	0	10
• Bulldogs	0	7	7	14	28

- Date: September 12, 2015
- Location: Johnson Hagood Stadium, Charleston, SC
- Game start: 6:00 PM EST
- Game attendance: 8,048

Scoring summary
2	14:42	CIT	Dominique Allen 1-yard run (Eric Goins kick)	CIT 7–0
2	5:26	WCU	Logan Howard 20-yard field goal	CIT 7–3
3	6:48	WCU	Detrez Newsome 4-yard run (Howard kick)	WCU 10–7
3	0:45	CIT	Jorian Jordan fumble recovery in end zone (Goins kick)	CIT 14–10
4	12:04	CIT	Evan McField 3-yard run (Goins kick)	CIT 21–10
4	9:15	CIT	Allen 5-yard run (Goins kick)	CIT 28–10

=== Georgia Southern ===
Team	1	2	3	4	Total
Bulldogs	0	0	7	6	13
• Eagles	10	21	10	7	48

- Date: September 19, 2015
- Location: Paulson Stadium, Statesboro, GA
- Game start: 6:00 PM EST
- Game attendance: 24,872

Scoring summary
1	11:46	GSU	Allex Hanks 22-yard field goal	GSU 3–0
1	1:25	GSU	Kevin Ellison 1-yard run (Hanks kick)	GSU 10–0
2	12:35	GSU	Matt Breida 25-yard run (Hanks kick)	GSU 17–0
2	8:43	GSU	Breida 87-yard run (Hanks kick)	GSU 24–0
2	3:50	GSU	Ellison 9-yard run (Hanks kick)	GSU 31–0
3	11:47	CIT	Evan McField 60-yard run (Eric Goins kick)	GSU 31–7
3	6:17	GSU	LA Ramsby 7-yard run (Hanks kick)	GSU 38–7
3	4:54	GSU	Hanks 40-yard field goal	GSU 41–7
4	12:50	GSU	Wesley Fields 2-yard run (Hanks kick)	GSU 48–7
4	4:11	CIT	Cam Jackson 6-yard run (Pass conversion failed)	GSU 48–13

=== Charleston Southern ===
Team	1	2	3	4	Total
• Buccaneers	0	6	10	17	33
Bulldogs	7	10	3	0	20

- Date: September 26, 2015
- Location: Johnson Hagood Stadium, Charleston, SC
- Game start: 6:00 PM EST
- Game attendance: 11,998

Scoring summary
1	6:48	CIT	Dominique Allen 7-yard run (Eric Goins kick)	CIT 7–0
2	10:13	CIT	Goins 27-yard field goal	CIT 10–0
2	2:15	CSU	Mike Holloway 31-yard run (Tyler Tekac kick blocked)	CIT 10–6
2	0:04	CIT	Devonta Delaney 44-yard interception return (Goins kick)	CIT 17–6
3	14:01	CSU	Holloway 8-yard run (Tekac kick)	CIT 17–13
3	7:08	CSU	Tekac 37-yard field goal	CIT 17–16
3	1:30	CIT	Goins 45-yard field goal	CIT 20–16
4	11:48	CSU	Tekac 32-yard field goal	CIT 20–19
4	7:33	CSU	Darius Hammond 21-yard run (Pass conversion failed)	CSU 25–20
4	3:54	CSU	Holloway 73-yard run (Austin Brown pass to Colton Corn)	CSU 33–20

=== Wofford ===
Team	1	2	3	4	Total
Terriers	0	6	6	0	12
• Bulldogs	14	7	15	3	39

- Date: October 10, 2015
- Location: Johnson Hagood Stadium, Charleston, SC
- Game start: 2:00 PM EST
- Game attendance: 10,428

Scoring summary
1	6:21	CIT	Dominique Allen 1-yard run (Eric Goins kick)	CIT 7–0
1	0:07	CIT	Allen 24-yard run (Goins kick)	CIT 14–0
2	4:28	WOF	Lorenzo Long 3-yard run (kick failed)	CIT 14–6
2	0:56	CIT	Reggie Williams 17-yard run (Goins kick)	CIT 21–6
3	8:17	CIT	Tyler Renew 3-yard run (Goins kick)	CIT 28–6
3	4:34	WOF	Ray Smith 8-yard run (Run conversion failed)	CIT 28–12
3	2:30	CIT	Brandon Eakins 24-yard pass from Allen (Smith pass from Allen conversion)	CIT 36–12
4	5:56	CIT	Goins 24-yard field goal	CIT 39–12

=== Samford ===
Team	1	2	3	4	Total
• Bulldogs (CIT)	7	28	6	3	44
Bulldogs (SAM)	7	7	3	8	25

- Date: October 17, 2015
- Location: Seibert Stadium, Homewood, AL
- Game start: 3:00 PM EST
- Game attendance: 4,927

Scoring summary
1	9:36	CIT	Dominique Allen 1-yard run (Eric Goins kick)	CIT 7–0
1	1:04	SAM	Michael Eubank 32-yard run (Anthony Pistelli kick)	TIE 7–7
2	12:14	CIT	Vinny Miller 8-yard run (Goins kick)	CIT 14–7
2	7:19	CIT	Isiaha Smith 31-yard run (Goins kick)	CIT 21–7
2	3:39	SAM	Michael Pierce 1-yard run (Pistelli kick)	CIT 21–14
2	0:56	CIT	Smith 1-yard run (Goins kick)	CIT 28–14
2	0:37	CIT	DeVonta Delaney 25-yard fumble return (Goins kick)	CIT 35–14
3	9:30	CIT	Smith 9-yard run (run conversion failed)	CIT 41–14
3	7:15	SAM	Pistelli 25-yard field goal	CIT 41–17
4	12:21	SAM	Karel Hamilton 83-yard pass from Devlin Hodges (Darius Harvey pass conversion to Devlin Hodges)	CIT 41–25
4	9:17	CIT	Goins 41-yard field goal	CIT 44–25

=== Furman ===
Team	1	2	3	4	Total
• Bulldogs	7	17	7	7	38
Paladins	7	0	10	0	17

- Date: October 24, 2015
- Location: Paladin Stadium, Greenville, SC
- Game start: 1:30 PM EST
- Game attendance: 12,124

Scoring summary
1	10:27	FUR	Chad Scott 20-yard pass from Reese Hannon (Jon Croft Hollingsworth kick)	FUR 7–0
1	7:31	CIT	Cam Jackson 34-yard run (Eric Goins kick)	7–7
2	11:53	CIT	Dominque Allen 1-yard run (Goins kick)	CIT 14–7
2	6:10	CIT	Brandon Eakins 35-yard run (Goins kick)	CIT 21–7
2	0:02	CIT	Goins 22-yard field goal	CIT 24–7
3	12:32	FUR	Duncan Fletcher 19-yard pass from Logan McCarter (Hollingsworth kick)	CIT 24–14
3	4:03	FUR	Hollingsworth 20-yard field goal	CIT 24–17
3	1:39	CIT	Allen 1-yard run (Goins kick)	CIT 31–17
4	3:57	CIT	Jackson 11-yard run (Goins kick)	CIT 38–17

=== Mercer ===
Team	1	2	3	4	Total
Bears	10	0	3	6	19
• Bulldogs	0	14	0	7	21

- Date: October 31, 2015
- Location: Johnson Hagood Stadium, Charleston, SC
- Game start: 2:00 PM EST
- Game attendance: 10,006

Scoring summary
1	6:04	MER	Jagger Lieb 29-yard field goal	MER 3–0
1	1:56	MER	Robert Brown 5-yard pass from John Russ (Lieb kick)	MER 10–0
2	3:20	CIT	Reggie Williams 2-yard run (Eric Goins kick)	MER 10–7
2	0:53	CIT	Isiaha Smith 83-yard run (Goins kick)	CIT 14–10
3	1:41	MER	Lieb 22-yard field goal	CIT 14–13
2	7:49	CIT	Dominque Allen 3-yard run (Goins kick)	CIT 21–13
4	3:12	MER	Alex Lakes 1-yard run (Pass conversion failed)	CIT 21–19

=== VMI ===
Team	1	2	3	4	Total
Keydets	7	0	7	0	14
• #25 Bulldogs	14	6	6	9	35

- Date: November 7, 2015
- Location: Johnson Hagood Stadium, Charleston, SC
- Game start: 2:00 PM EST
- Game attendance: 14,925

Scoring summary
1	12:11	CIT	Cam Jackson 68-yard run (Eric Goins kick)	CIT 7–0
1	7:30	CIT	Quinlan Washington 72-yard interception return (Goins kick)	CIT 14–0
1	0:15	VMI	Derrick Ziglar 3-yard pass from Hayden Alford (Dillon Christopher kick)	CIT 14–7
2	12:16	CIT	Goins 33-yard field goal	CIT 17–7
2	0:00	CIT	Goins 26-yard field goal	CIT 20–7
3	11:47	VMI	Ziglar 3-yard run (Christopher kick)	CIT 20–14
3	5:58	CIT	Goins-yard field goal	CIT 23–14
3	1:10	CIT	Goins-yard field goal	CIT 26–14
4	7:51	CIT	Goins-yard field goal	CIT 29–14
4	0:07	CIT	Tevin Floyd 75-yard interception return (kick failed)	CIT 35–14

=== Chattanooga ===
Team	1	2	3	4	Total
#21 Bulldogs	0	0	14	9	23
• #8 Mocs	14	7	3	7	31

- Date: November 14, 2015
- Game start: 2:00 PM EST
- Game attendance: 11,594

Scoring summary
1	14:48	UTC	Xavier Borishade 75-yard pass from Alejandro Bennifield (Henrique Ribeiro kick)	UTC 7–0
1	2:02	UTC	Jacob Huesman 1-yard run (Ribeiro kick)	UTC 14–0
2	1:06	UTC	Huesman 9-yard run (Ribeiro kick)	UTC 21–0
3	8:31	CIT	Alex Glover-yard pass from Dominique Allen (Eric Goins kick)	UTC 21–7
3	2:26	UTC	Ribeiro 21-yard field goal	UTC 24–7
3	2:02	CIT	Tyler Renew 52-yard run (Goins kick)	UTC 24–14
4	7:43	UTC	Derrick Craine 46-yard run (Ribeiro kick)	UTC 31–14
4	3:07	CIT	Goins 27-yard field goal	UTC 31–17
4	0:00	CIT	Brandon Eakins 14-yard pass from Allen	UTC 31–23

=== South Carolina ===
Team	1	2	3	4	Total
• #25 Bulldogs	14	0	0	9	23
Gamecocks	3	6	7	6	22

- Date: November 21, 2015
- Location: Williams-Brice Stadium, Columbia, SC
- Game start: 12:00 p.m. EST
- Game attendance: 77,241
- Television network: SECN Alt.

Scoring summary
1	12:26	CIT	Cam Jackson 59-yard run (Eric Goins kick)	CIT 7–0
1	9:52	USC	Elliot Fry 36-yard field goal	CIT 7–3
1	3:31	CIT	Tyler Renew 7-yard run (Goins kick)	CIT 14–3
2	12:55	USC	Fry 25-yard field goal	CIT 14–6
2	4:12	USC	Fry 40-yard field goal	CIT 14–9
3	6:22	USC	Brandon Wilds 1-yard run (Fry kick)	USC 16–14
4	10:26	CIT	Goins 48-yard field goal	CIT 17–16
4	8:40	USC	Pharoh Cooper 41-yard pass from Perry Orth (run conversion failed)	USC 22–17
4	6:07	CIT	Renew 56-yard run (run conversion failed)	CIT 23–22

== FCS playoffs ==
=== First round – Coastal Carolina ===
Team	1	2	3	4	Total
• #18 Bulldogs	14	0	14	13	41
#10 Chanticleers	7	14	7	10	38

- Date: November 28, 2015
- Location: Brooks Stadium, Conway, SC
- Game start: 2:00 p.m. EST
- Game attendance: 6,753
- Television network: ESPN3

Scoring summary
1	12:20	CIT	Cam Jackson 68-yard run (Eric Goins kick)	CIT 7–0
1	11:53	CCU	Bruce Mapp 91-yard pass from Alex Ross (Ryan Granger kick)	7–7
1	5:56	CIT	Tyler Renew 3-yard run (Eric Goins kick)	CIT 14–7
2	13:20	CCU	Craig Weick 26-yard pass from Ross	14–14
2	6:49	CCU	De'Angelo Henderson 44-yard run	CCU 21–14
3	10:33	CIT	Allen 7-yard run (Eric Goins kick)	21–21
3	8:47	CCU	Henderson 16-yard pass from Ross	CCU 28–21
3	7:01	CIT	Allen 1-yard run (Eric Goins kick)	28–28
4	13:54	CIT	Goins-yard field goal	CIT 31–28
4	13:06	CIT	Shy Phillips 32-yard interception return (Eric Goins kick)	CIT 38–28
4	10:07	CCU	Granger 26-yard field goal	CIT 38–31
4	5:38	CCU	Osharmar Abercrombie 16-yard run	38–38
4	0:00	CIT	Goins 43-yard field goal	CIT 41–38

=== Second round – Charleston Southern ===
Team	1	2	3	4	Total
#18 Bulldogs	3	0	0	3	6
• #9 Buccaneers	0	14	0	0	14

- Date: December 5, 2015
- Location: Buccaneer Field, North Charleston, SC
- Game start: 1:00 PM EST
- Game attendance: 8,451

Scoring summary
1	12:11	CIT	Eric Goins 43-yard field goal	CIT 3–0
2	6:33	CSU	Mike Holloway 41-yard run (Tyler Tekac kick)	CSU 7–3
2	1:14	CSU	Holloway 32-yard run (Tekac kick)	CSU 14–3
4	12:14	CIT	Goins 39-yard field goal	CSU 14–6

== Ranking movements ==
Ranking movements Legend: ██ Increase in ranking ██ Decrease in ranking — = Not ranked RV = Received votes
	Week													
Poll	Pre	1	2	3	4	5	6	7	8	9	10	11	12	Final
STATS FCS	—	—	RV	—	—	—	RV	RV	RV	25	21	25	18	13
Coaches	—	—	—	—	—	—	—	RV	RV	22	20	24	18	15

== Honors and awards ==
Preseason All-Southern Conference

- Sam Frye (1st team)
- Mitchell Jeter (1st team)
