= 2015 Western Carolina Catamounts football team =

American college football season

2015 Western Carolina Catamounts football
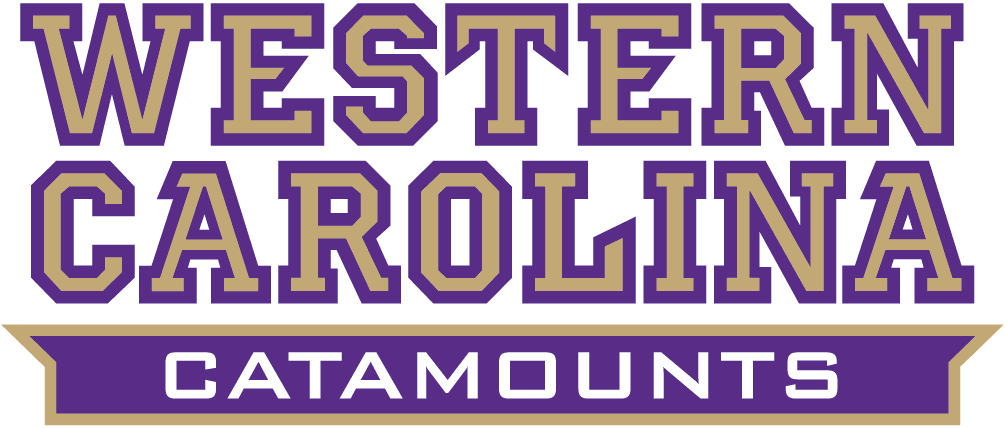
- Conference: Southern Conference
- Record: 7–4 (5–2 SoCon)
- Head coach: Mark Speir (4th season)
- Offensive coordinator: Brad Glenn (4th season)
- Defensive coordinator: Shawn Quinn (3rd season)
- Home stadium: Bob Waters Field at E. J. Whitmire Stadium

2015 Southern Conference football standings
| | Conf. | | | Overall |
| Team | W | | L | W | | L |
|---|---|---|---|---|---|---|
| No. 9 Chattanooga +^ | 6 | – | 1 | 9 | – | 4 |
| No. 13 The Citadel +^ | 6 | – | 1 | 9 | – | 4 |
| Western Carolina | 5 | – | 2 | 7 | – | 4 |
| Samford | 3 | – | 4 | 6 | – | 5 |
| Wofford | 3 | – | 4 | 5 | – | 6 |
| Mercer | 2 | – | 5 | 5 | – | 6 |
| Furman | 2 | – | 5 | 4 | – | 7 |
| VMI | 1 | – | 6 | 2 | – | 9 |
+ – Conference co-champions; ^ – FCS playoff participant; Rankings from STATS Poll

The 2015 Western Carolina Catamounts team represented Western Carolina University as a member of the Southern Conference (SoCon) during the 2015 NCAA Division I FCS football season. Led by fourth-year head coach Mark Speir, the Catamounts compiled an overall record of 7–4 with a mark of 5–2 in conference play, placing third in the SoCon. Western Carolina played home games at Bob Waters Field at E. J. Whitmire Stadium in Cullowhee, North Carolina.

== Schedule ==
| Date | Time | Opponent | Site | TV | Result | Attendance |
|---|---|---|---|---|---|---|
| September 5 | 7:00 pm | Mars Hill* | Bob Waters Field at E. J. Whitmire Stadium; Cullowhee, NC | SDN | W 42–14 | 12,348 |
| September 12 | 6:00 pm | at The Citadel | Johnson Hagood Stadium; Charleston, SC | ESPN3 | L 10–28 | 8,048 |
| September 19 | 7:00 pm | at Tennessee* | Neyland Stadium; Knoxville, TN | ESPNU | L 10–55 | 102,136 |
| October 3 | 3:30 pm | Presbyterian* | Bob Waters Field at E. J. Whitmire Stadium; Cullowhee, NC | WMYA | W 33–21 | 9,191 |
| October 10 | 3:30 pm | Mercer | Bob Waters Field at E. J. Whitmire Stadium; Cullowhee, NC | ASN | W 24–21 | 8,479 |
| October 17 | 2:00 pm | at Wofford | Gibbs Stadium; Spartanburg, SC | ESPN3 | W 24–17 | 7,344 |
| October 24 | 3:30 pm | Samford^{†} | Bob Waters Field at E. J. Whitmire Stadium; Cullowhee, NC | SDN | W 56–36 | 12,014 |
| October 31 | 2:00 pm | at No. 4 Chattanooga | Finley Stadium; Chattanooga, TN | ESPN3 | L 13–41 | 11,495 |
| November 7 | 3:30 pm | Furman | Bob Waters Field at E. J. Whitmire Stadium; Cullowhee, NC | SDN | W 48–10 | 8,561 |
| November 14 | 7:00 pm | at Texas A&M* | Kyle Field; College Station, TX | ESPNU | L 17–41 | 101,583 |
| November 21 | 1:30 pm | at VMI | Alumni Memorial Field; Lexington, VA | ESPN3 | W 24–20 | 4,523 |
*Non-conference game; ^{†}Homecoming; Rankings from STATS Poll released prior to the game; All times are in Eastern time
