= 2015 Chattanooga Mocs football team =

American college football season

2015 Chattanooga Mocs football

SoCon co-champion

NCAA Division I Second Round, L 35–41 ^{OT}vs. Jacksonville State
- Conference: Southern Conference

Ranking
- STATS: No. 9
- FCS Coaches: No. 8
- Record: 9–4 (6–1 SoCon)
- Head coach: Russ Huesman (7th season)
- Offensive coordinator: Jeff Durden (3rd season)
- Defensive coordinator: Adam Braithwaite (3rd season)
- Home stadium: Finley Stadium

2015 Southern Conference football standings
	Conf.			Overall
Team	W		L	W		L
No. 9 Chattanooga +^	6	–	1	9	–	4
No. 13 The Citadel +^	6	–	1	9	–	4
Western Carolina	5	–	2	7	–	4
Samford	3	–	4	6	–	5
Wofford	3	–	4	5	–	6
Mercer	2	–	5	5	–	6
Furman	2	–	5	4	–	7
VMI	1	–	6	2	–	9
+ – Conference co-champions; ^ – FCS playoff participant; Rankings from STATS Poll

The 2015 Chattanooga Mocs football team represented the University of Tennessee at Chattanooga in the 2015 NCAA Division I FCS football season as a member of the Southern Conference (SoCon). The Mocs were led by seventh-year head coach Russ Huesman and played their home games at Finley Stadium in Chattanooga, Tennessee. They finished the season 9–4 overall and 6–1 in SoCon play to share for the SoCon title with The Citadel. Chattanooga earned the SoCon's automatic bid to the NCAA Division I Football Championship playoffs, where they defeated Fordham in the first round before losing in the second round to Jacksonville State.

== Schedule ==
Date	Time	Opponent	Rank	Site	TV	Result	Attendance
September 5	6:00 pm	No. 7 Jacksonville State*	No. 8	Finley Stadium; Chattanooga, TN	SDN	L 20–23	15,812
September 12	1:00 pm	Mars Hill*	No. 12	Finley Stadium; Chattanooga, TN	SDN	W 44–34	9,491
September 19	2:30 pm	at Samford	No. 10	Seibert Stadium; Homewood, AL	ASN	W 31–21	9,088
September 26	7:00 pm	at Presbyterian*	No. 8	Bailey Memorial Stadium; Clinton, SC	BSN	W 21–0	3,582
October 10	1:00 pm	Furman	No. 6	Finley Stadium; Chattanooga, TN	ESPN3	W 31–3	7,630
October 17	1:30 pm	at VMI	No. 6	Alumni Memorial Field; Lexington, VA	ESPN3	W 33–27	6,104
October 24	1:30 pm	at Wofford	No. 5	Gibbs Stadium; Spartanburg, SC	SDN	W 20–17	8,713
October 31	2:00 pm	Western Carolina^{†}	No. 4	Finley Stadium; Chattanooga, TN	ESPN3	W 41–13	11,495
November 7	4:00 pm	at Mercer	No. 3	Moye Complex; Macon, GA	ESPN3	L 14–17	9,527
November 14	2:00 pm	No. 21 The Citadel	No. 8	Finley Stadium; Chattanooga, TN	SDN	W 31–23	11,594
November 21	3:00 pm	at No. 16 (FBS) Florida State*	No. 8	Doak Campbell Stadium; Tallahassee, FL	ACCRSN	L 13–52	66,412
November 28	1:00 pm	No. 13 Fordham*	No. 7	Finley Stadium; Chattanooga, TN (NCAA Division I First Round)	ESPN3	W 50–20	4,888
December 5	2:00 pm	at No. 1 Jacksonville State*	No. 7	JSU Stadium; Jacksonville, AL (NCAA Division I Second Round)	ESPN3	L 35–41 ^{OT}	21,452
*Non-conference game; ^{†}Homecoming; Rankings from STATS Poll released prior to the game; All times are in Eastern time

== Game summaries ==
=== Jacksonville State ===
	1	2	3	4	Total
#7 Jacksonville State	3	7	3	10	23
#8 Mocs	10	0	3	7	20

=== Mars Hill ===
	1	2	3	4	Total
Mountain Lions	7	14	0	13	34
#12 Mocs	7	14	14	9	44

=== At Samford ===
	1	2	3	4	Total
#10 Mocs	7	17	0	7	31
Bulldogs	14	0	0	7	21

=== At Presbyterian ===
	1	2	3	4	Total
#8 Mocs	7	7	0	7	21
Blue Hose	0	0	0	0	0

=== Furman ===
	1	2	3	4	Total
Paladins	3	0	0	0	3
#6 Mocs	0	21	3	7	31

=== At VMI ===
	1	2	3	4	Total
#6 Mocs	3	17	3	10	33
Keydets	7	14	0	6	27

=== At Wofford ===
	1	2	3	4	Total
#5 Mocs	7	0	10	3	20
Terriers	0	9	0	8	17

=== Western Carolina ===
	1	2	3	4	Total
Catamounts	6	0	7	0	13
#4 Mocs	14	21	3	3	41

=== At Mercer ===
	1	2	3	4	Total
#3 Mocs	0	7	0	7	14
Bears	7	3	7	0	17

=== The Citadel ===
	1	2	3	4	Total
#21 Bulldogs	0	0	14	9	23
#8 Mocs	14	7	3	7	31

=== At Florida State ===
	1	2	3	4	Total
#8 Mocs	3	3	0	7	13
#16 (FBS) Seminoles	7	17	21	7	52

== FCS playoffs ==
=== First Round–Fordham ===
	1	2	3	4	Total
#13 Rams	0	0	14	6	20
#7 Mocs	21	10	10	9	50

=== Second Round–at Jacksonville State ===
	1	2	3	4	OT	Total
#7 Mocs	7	7	7	14	0	35
#1 Gamecocks	0	21	7	7	6	41

== Ranking movements ==
Ranking movements Legend: ██ Increase in ranking ██ Decrease in ranking
	Week													
Poll	Pre	1	2	3	4	5	6	7	8	9	10	11	12	Final
STATS	8	10	10	8	8	6	6	5	4	3	8	8	7	9
Coaches	8	12	12	9	8	6	6	5	4	3	9	9	8	8
