= 2015 Mercer Bears football team =

American college football season

2015 Mercer Bears football
- Conference: Southern Conference
- Record: 5–6 (2–5 SoCon)
- Head coach: Bobby Lamb (3rd season)
- Offensive coordinator: Casey Vogt (3rd season)
- Defensive coordinator: Mike Kolakowski (3rd season)
- Home stadium: Moye Complex

2015 Southern Conference football standings
	Conf.			Overall
Team	W		L	W		L
No. 9 Chattanooga +^	6	–	1	9	–	4
No. 13 The Citadel +^	6	–	1	9	–	4
Western Carolina	5	–	2	7	–	4
Samford	3	–	4	6	–	5
Wofford	3	–	4	5	–	6
Mercer	2	–	5	5	–	6
Furman	2	–	5	4	–	7
VMI	1	–	6	2	–	9
+ – Conference co-champions; ^ – FCS playoff participant; Rankings from STATS Poll

The 2015 Mercer Bears football team represented Mercer University as a member the Southern Conference (SoCon) during the 2015 NCAA Division I FCS football season. They were led by third-year head coach Bobby Lamb and played their home games at the Moye Complex in Macon, Georgia. Mercer finished the season 5–6 overall and 2–5 in SoCon play to tie for sixth place.

== Schedule ==
Date	Time	Opponent	Site	TV	Result	Attendance
September 5	5:00 pm	at Austin Peay*	Governors Stadium; Clarksville, TN	APSU-TV	W 28–7	5,814
September 12	6:00 pm	Stetson*	Moye Complex; Macon, GA	ESPN3	W 57–14	11,267
September 19	7:00 pm	at Tennessee Tech*	Tucker Stadium; Cookeville, TN	WCTE	L 22–29	9,028
October 3	6:00 pm	Wofford	Moye Complex; Macon, GA	ESPN3	L 33–34 ^{OT}	10,489
October 10	3:30 pm	at Western Carolina	E. J. Whitmire Stadium; Cullowhee, NC	SDN	L 21–24	8,479
October 17	4:00 pm	East Tennessee State*	Moye Complex; Macon, GA	ESPN3	W 52–0	10,200
October 24	3:00 pm	VMI^{†}	Moye Complex; Macon, GA	ESPN3	L 21–28	9,754
October 31	2:00 pm	at The Citadel	Johnson Hagood Stadium; Charleston, SC	ESPN3	L 19–21	10,006
November 7	4:00 pm	No. 3 Chattanooga	Moye Complex; Macon, GA	ESPN3	W 17–14	9,527
November 14	1:30 pm	at Furman	Paladin Stadium; Greenville, SC	ESPN3	W 27–20 ^{OT}	6,351
November 21	3:00 pm	Samford	Moye Complex; Macon, GA	ESPN3	L 21–47	11,273
*Non-conference game; ^{†}Homecoming; Rankings from STATS Poll released prior to the game; All times are in Eastern time
