= Tom Clark (American football) =

American football coach

Current position
- Title: Special teams coordinator & linebackers coach
- Team: Christopher Newport
- Conference: NJAC

Biographical details
- Born: Washington, D.C., U.S.
- Education: Maryland (1986) (BS)

Coaching career (HC unless noted)
- 1983–1984: St. John's College HS (DC) (assistant)
- 1985–1986: Catholic University (DB)
- 1987–1988: Colorado (DB)
- 1989–1993: Bishop McNamara HS (MD)
- 1994–2000: Catholic University
- 2001–2003: William & Mary (DC)
- 2004–2005: Catholic University
- 2006–2011: Liberty (DC)
- 2012–2014: William & Mary (DB)
- 2015–2021: VMI (DC)
- 2022: Hampden–Sydney (AHC/D)
- 2023–2024: Shepherd (OC)
- 2025–present: Christopher Newport (STC/LB)

Head coaching record
- Overall: 58–32–1 (college)
- Tournaments: 0–3 (NCAA D-III playoffs)

Accomplishments and honors

Championships
- 1 ODAC (1999)

Tom Clark is an American college football coach. He is the special teams coordinator and linebackers coach for Christopher Newport University, positions he has held since 2025. Before that, Clark was the offensive coordinator for Shepherd University, a position he has held from 2023 to 2024. Clark served for nine non-consecutive seasons as the head football coach at Catholic University of America, where he compiled a 58–32–1 record and a .643 winning percentage. Clark was the defensive coordinator at the Virginia Military Institute (VMI) from 2015 to 2021.

== Early life ==
Clark was born and raised in Silver Spring, Maryland. He attended the University of Maryland, College Park, where he graduated in 1986 with a bachelor's degree in kinesiology. His first coaching position was as the assistant coach at St. John's College High School in Washington, D.C. from 1983 to 1984.

== Coaching career ==
Clark's first college coaching experience was as the secondary coach for the football team at Catholic from 1985 to 1986. He then moved on to Colorado, where he served in the same capacity for the 1987 and 1988 seasons. He returned to the Washington metropolitan area to serve as athletic director and head football coach at Bishop McNamara High School in Forestville, Maryland from 1988 to 1994.

In 1994, Clark returned to Catholic to take the head coaching position. He remained there for seven seasons and compiled a record of 56–14–1 and a 0.792 winning percentage. Each year from 1997 to 1999, Catholic advanced to the Division III playoffs before being eliminated. In 1999, the team won the Old Dominion Athletic Conference (ODAC) championship with a 9–2 record. It was the first year that Catholic was eligible for the ODAC title as a new member.

From 2001 to 2003, Clark served as the defensive coordinator for William & Mary. The Tribe won a share of the Atlantic 10 Conference championship in his first year. In 2004, Clark returned to Catholic again as head coach. He stayed for two seasons, but was less successful, compiling a 2–18 record.

In 2006, Clark became the defensive coordinator for Liberty University in Lynchburg, Virginia. He installed a 3–4 defense, which had previously never been used at Liberty. During that first season, the Liberty Flames ranked 12th nationally in scoring defense, allowing 15.64 points per game, and 36th in total defense, allowing a total of 306.0 yards per game.

He returned to Williamsburg in 2012 to serve as the Tribe's defensive backs coach.

After three seasons with the Tribe, Clark was hired by Scott Wachenheim as the defensive coordinator of the Virginia Military Institute. In addition to being a defensive coordinator, Clark will also handle the defensive backs and secondary.

After leading the Keydets' defense for eights seasons, including helping guide VMI to a Southern Conference championship and FCS playoff berth in the spring season of 2021, Clark resigned in February 2022. In March 2022, Clark was hired as the assistant head football coach at Hampden–Sydney College in Hampden Sydney, Virginia. The move reunited Clark with long-time friend Marty Favret, whom he coached with at Catholic University.

== Head coaching record ==
=== College ===
Year	Team	Overall	Conference	Standing	Bowl/playoffs
Catholic University Cardinals (NCAA Division III independent) (1994–1998)
1994	Catholic University	8–2			
1995	Catholic University	6–2–1			
1996	Catholic University	7–2			
1997	Catholic University	10–1			L NCAA Division III First Round
1998	Catholic University	10–1			L NCAA Division III First Round
Catholic University Cardinals (Old Dominion Athletic Conference) (1999–2000)
1999	Catholic University	9–2	6–0	1st	L NCAA Division III First Round
2000	Catholic University	6–4	4–2	3rd	
Catholic University Cardinals (Old Dominion Athletic Conference) (2004–2005)
2004	Catholic University	0–10	0–6	7th	
2005	Catholic University	2–8	1–5	T–5th	
Catholic University:		58–32–1	11–13		
Total:		58–32–1			
National championship Conference title Conference division title or championship game berth

== See also ==
- List of college football head coaches with non-consecutive tenure
