= 2015 Wofford Terriers football team =

American college football season

2015 Wofford Terriers football
- Conference: Southern Conference
- Record: 5–6 (3–4 SoCon)
- Head coach: Mike Ayers (28th season)
- Offensive coordinator: Wade Long
- Defensive coordinator: Nathan Fuqua
- Home stadium: Gibbs Stadium

2015 Southern Conference football standings
	Conf.			Overall
Team	W		L	W		L
No. 9 Chattanooga +^	6	–	1	9	–	4
No. 13 The Citadel +^	6	–	1	9	–	4
Western Carolina	5	–	2	7	–	4
Samford	3	–	4	6	–	5
Wofford	3	–	4	5	–	6
Mercer	2	–	5	5	–	6
Furman	2	–	5	4	–	7
VMI	1	–	6	2	–	9
+ – Conference co-champions; ^ – FCS playoff participant; Rankings from STATS Poll

The 2015 Wofford Terriers football team represented Wofford College in the 2015 NCAA Division I FCS football season. They were led by 28th-year head coach Mike Ayers and played their home games at Gibbs Stadium. They were a member of the Southern Conference. They finished the season 5–6, 3–4 in SoCon play to finish in a tie for fourth place with the Samford Bulldogs.

== Schedule ==
Date	Time	Opponent	Site	TV	Result	Attendance
September 5	12:30 pm	at No. 12 (FBS) Clemson*	Memorial Stadium; Clemson, SC	ACCN	L 10–49	81,345
September 12	7:00 pm	Tennessee Tech*	Gibbs Stadium; Spartanburg, SC	SDN	W 34–14	6,834
September 19	5:00 pm	at Idaho*	Kibbie Dome; Moscow, ID	ESPN3	L 38–41	11,633
September 26	7:00 pm	Gardner–Webb*	Gibbs Stadium; Spartanburg, SC	SDN	W 16–0	6,932
October 3	6:00 pm	at Mercer	Moye Complex; Macon, GA	ESPN3	W 34–33 ^{OT}	10,489
October 10	2:00 pm	at The Citadel	Johnson Hagood Stadium; Charleston, SC	ESPN3	L 12–39	10,428
October 17	2:00 pm	Western Carolina	Gibbs Stadium; Spartanburg, SC	ESPN3	L 17–24	7,344
October 24	1:30 pm	No. 5 Chattanooga^{†}	Gibbs Stadium; Spartanburg, SC	SDN	L 17–20	8,713
October 31	1:30 pm	at VMI	Alumni Memorial Field; Lexington, VA	ESPN3	W 41–20	4,437
November 14	1:30 pm	Samford	Gibbs Stadium; Spartanburg, SC	ESPN3	L 27–37	5,077
November 21	3:30 pm	Furman	Gibbs Stadium; Spartanburg, SC	ASN	W 38–28	7,143
*Non-conference game; ^{†}Homecoming; Rankings from STATS Poll released prior to the game; All times are in Eastern time

- Source: Schedule
