= 2015 Furman Paladins football team =

American college football season

2015 Furman Paladins football
- Conference: Southern Conference
- Record: 4–7 (2–5 SoCon)
- Head coach: Bruce Fowler (5th season)
- Offensive coordinator: Tim Sorrells (1st season)
- Defensive coordinator: Kyle Gillenwater (1st season)
- Captains: Reese Hannon; Jordan Snellings; Cory Magwood
- Home stadium: Paladin Stadium

2015 Southern Conference football standings
	Conf.			Overall
Team	W		L	W		L
No. 9 Chattanooga +^	6	–	1	9	–	4
No. 13 The Citadel +^	6	–	1	9	–	4
Western Carolina	5	–	2	7	–	4
Samford	3	–	4	6	–	5
Wofford	3	–	4	5	–	6
Mercer	2	–	5	5	–	6
Furman	2	–	5	4	–	7
VMI	1	–	6	2	–	9
+ – Conference co-champions; ^ – FCS playoff participant; Rankings from STATS Poll

The 2015 Furman Paladins team represented Furman University as a member of the Southern Conference (SoCon) during the 2015 NCAA Division I FCS football season. Led by fifth-year head coach Bruce Fowler, the Paladins compiled an overall record of 4–7 with a mark of 2–5 in conference play, tying for sixth place in the SoCon. The team played home games at Paladin Stadium in Greenville, South Carolina.

== Schedule ==
Date	Time	Opponent	Site	TV	Result	Attendance
September 5	7:00 pm	No. 5 Coastal Carolina*	Paladin Stadium; Greenville, SC	ESPN3	L 35–38	6,563
September 12	3:30 pm	at Virginia Tech*	Lane Stadium; Blacksburg, VA	ESPN3	L 3–42	60,118
September 19	6:00 pm	at UCF*	Bright House Networks Stadium; Orlando, FL	ESPN3	W 16–15	36,484
September 26	3:00 pm	VMI	Paladin Stadium; Greenville, SC	ESPN3	W 24–21	7,915
October 3	7:00 pm	South Carolina State*	Paladin Stadium; Greenville, SC	ESPN3	W 17–3	1,022
October 10	1:00 pm	at No. 6 Chattanooga	Finley Stadium; Chattanooga, TN	ESPN3	L 3–31	7,630
October 24	1:30 pm	The Citadel^{†}	Paladin Stadium; Greenville, SC (rivalry)	ESPN3	L 17–38	12,124
October 31	3:00 pm	at Samford	Seibert Stadium; Homewood, AL	SDN	W 20–17	4,013
November 7	3:30 pm	at Western Carolina	Bob Waters Field at E. J. Whitmire Stadium; Cullowhee, NC	SDN	L 10–48	8,561
November 14	1:30 pm	Mercer	Paladin Stadium; Greenville, SC	ESPN3	L 20–27 ^{OT}	6,351
November 21	3:30 pm	at Wofford	Gibbs Stadium; Spartanburg, SC (rivalry)	ASN	L 28–38	7,143
*Non-conference game; ^{†}Homecoming; Rankings from STATS Poll released prior to the game; All times are in Eastern time
