= 2015 Samford Bulldogs football team =

American college football season

2015 Samford Bulldogs football
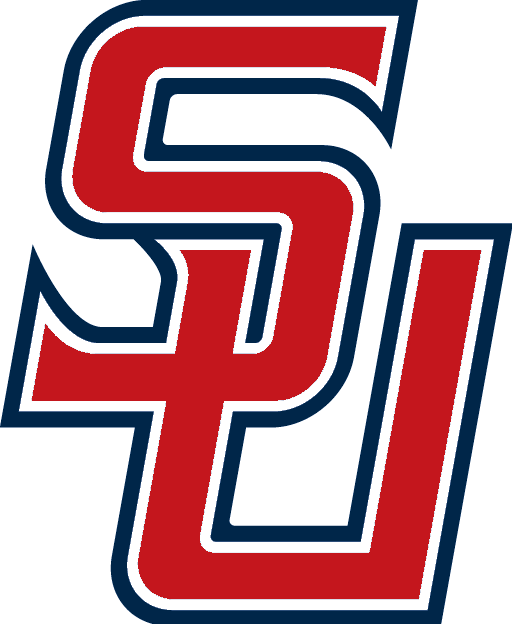
- Conference: Southern Conference
- Record: 6–5 (3–4 SoCon)
- Head coach: Chris Hatcher (1st season)
- Offensive coordinator: Travis Trickett (4th season)
- Offensive scheme: Air raid
- Defensive coordinator: Bill D'Ottavio (9th season)
- Base defense: 4–3
- Home stadium: Seibert Stadium

2015 Southern Conference football standings
	Conf.			Overall
Team	W		L	W		L
No. 9 Chattanooga +^	6	–	1	9	–	4
No. 13 The Citadel +^	6	–	1	9	–	4
Western Carolina	5	–	2	7	–	4
Samford	3	–	4	6	–	5
Wofford	3	–	4	5	–	6
Mercer	2	–	5	5	–	6
Furman	2	–	5	4	–	7
VMI	1	–	6	2	–	9
+ – Conference co-champions; ^ – FCS playoff participant; Rankings from STATS Poll

The 2015 Samford Bulldogs football team represented Samford University in the 2015 NCAA Division I FCS football season. They were led by first year head coach Chris Hatcher and played their home games at Seibert Stadium. They were a member of the Southern Conference. They finished the season 6–5, 3–4 in SoCon play to finish in a tie for fourth place with the Wofford Terriers.

On December 11, 2014, Samford announced Hatcher as the team's new head coach.

== Schedule ==
Date	Time	Opponent	Site	TV	Result	Attendance
September 3	6:00 pm	Central Arkansas*	Seibert Stadium; Homewood, AL	ESPN3	W 45–16	6,259
September 12	2:00 pm	Florida A&M*	Seibert Stadium; Homewood, AL	ESPN3	W 58–21	4,714
September 19	2:30 pm	No. 10 Chattanooga	Seibert Stadium; Homewood, AL	ASN	L 21–31	9,088
September 26	6:00 pm	at Louisville*	Papa John's Cardinal Stadium; Louisville, KY	ESPN3	L 3–45	50,121
October 10	12:30 pm	at VMI	Alumni Memorial Field; Lexington, VA	ESPN3	W 49–13	4,875
October 17	2:00 pm	The Citadel	Seibert Stadium; Homewood, AL	ESPN3	L 25–44	4,927
October 24	2:30 pm	at Western Carolina	E. J. Whitmire Stadium; Cullowhee, NC	SDN	L 36–56	12,014
October 31	2:00 pm	Furman	Seibert Stadium; Homewood, AL	ESPN3	L 17–20	4,013
November 7	2:00 pm	Clark Atlanta*^{†}	Seibert Stadium; Homewood, AL	ESPN3	W 43–0	4,264
November 14	12:30 pm	at Wofford	Gibbs Stadium; Spartanburg, SC	ESPN3	W 37–27	5,077
November 21	2:00 pm	at Mercer	Moye Complex; Macon, GA	ESPN3	W 47–21	11,273
*Non-conference game; ^{†}Homecoming; Rankings from STATS Poll released prior to the game; All times are in Central time
