= Russ Huesman =

American football player and coach (born 1960)

Current position
- Title: Head coach
- Team: Richmond
- Conference: Patriot League
- Record: 66–46

Biographical details
- Born: January 28, 1960 (age 66); Cincinnati, Ohio, U.S.

Playing career
- 1978–1981: Chattanooga
- Position: Defensive back

Coaching career (HC unless noted)
- 1982: Chattanooga (SA)
- 1983–1984: South Carolina (GA)
- 1985: Martin County HS (FL) (DC)
- 1986–1990: William & Mary (DL)
- 1991–1996: William & Mary (DB)
- 1996–1997: William & Mary (DC/DB)
- 1998: Memphis (DE)
- 1999–2003: Memphis (TE)
- 2004–2008: Richmond (DC)
- 2009–2016: Chattanooga
- 2017–present: Richmond

Head coaching record
- Overall: 125–83

Accomplishments and honors

Championships
- 3 SoCon (2013, 2014, 2015); 2 CAA (2023, 2024)

Awards
- SoCon Coach of the Year (2013, 2014)

Russell Frederick Huesman (born January 28, 1960) is an American football coach and former player. He was named head football coach at the University of Richmond on December 14, 2016 after spending eight years as head coach of the University of Tennessee at Chattanooga. The Spiders compete in the NCAA Division I Football Championship Subdivision as members of the Patriot League.

== Playing career ==
A native of Cincinnati, Ohio, Huesman played prep football at perennial power Moeller High School, where he lettered for four years under head coach Gerry Faust. He helped Moeller's team compile a record of 43–0–1 and win a pair of Ohio state championships.

An all-city selection in football as a senior, Huesman signed a football scholarship with Chattanooga, where he started all four years as a defensive back (1978–1981) and was a two-sport athlete. He played under the late Joe Morrison for two years and competed his final two seasons under Bill Oliver. Huesman also patrolled center field on the baseball field for the Mocs during his freshman and junior seasons. During his playing career at Chattanooga, the Mocs posted a 31–11–2 mark and were Southern Conference co-champions in his freshman and sophomore seasons.

== Coaching career ==
Huesman began his coaching career as a student coach for University of Tennessee at Chattanooga during the 1982 season. He followed that up with a move to the University of South Carolina as a graduate assistant under Morrison.

=== William & Mary ===
Huesman than began a 14-year stretch at the College of William & Mary and was the Tribe's defensive coordinator for the 1996 and 1997 seasons. During his tenure with the Tribe, Huesman coached current NFL star Darren Sharper, who led a defense ranked second in the nation, allowing just 231.8 yards per game in 1996. That defensive squad also led the Yankee Conference in total defense and helped power the Tribe to their first conference title since 1970. In 1997, the Tribe defense was third overall in the Atlantic 10 and led the league in pass efficiency defense.

In addition to coordinating the Tribe's defense, Huesman, also coached the William & Mary secondary, a job he took over in 1991. In eight seasons under his direction, the College of William & Mary developed one of the most effective backfields in the nation.

During his time at William & Mary, Huesman also coached Steve Christie, a 15-year NFL place kicker with Tampa Bay, Buffalo, San Diego and the New York Giants. His coaching family tree also includes Alan Williams, the defensive backs coach for the Indianapolis Colts, and Sean McDermott, the head coach of the Buffalo Bills. Both Williams and McDermott played for Huesman at William & Mary.

=== Memphis ===
Huesman then spent six years at the University of Memphis (1998–2003) where he held several positions, serving as the recruiting coordinator and offensive line coach, before leaving for Richmond. He also coached the outside linebackers, tight ends and running backs. As recruiting coordinator, Huesman brought in a top-50 recruiting class, ranked No. 1 in Conference USA, in 2002. It was the first recruiting class ranked in the top-50 at Memphis in school history.

=== Assistant at Richmond ===
Huesman then moved on and spent the next five seasons as the defensive coordinator at the University of Richmond, helping guide the Spiders to the 2008 Football Championship Subdivision National Title. The Spiders were known for their "Stonewall Defense," a phrase that was coined by Bruce Dowd of the College Sporting News. Richmond's defense was ranked in the top-15 in the nation in each of the last three seasons under Huesman's guidance.

In 2006, Huesman led an experienced group that allowed just 268.7 yards per game to rank 11th in the nation and second in the conference. Against the pass, the Spiders were the Atlantic-10's most dominant team, yielding an average of 152.8 yards and intercepting a league-best 12 passes. Richmond's front seven ranked fourth in the conference and 21st in the nation against the run, limiting the opposition to just over 115 yards per game on the ground. The Richmond defense allowed the fourth-fewest points in the conference and 22nd fewest in the country (18.1).

In 2007, the Spiders ranked second in the CAA and 15th nationally in sacks per game (2.6), while ranking third in the league and 31st in the NCAA in turnover margin per game (+0.6) in 2007.

In 2008, Richmond's defense ranked in the top-10 in the FCS and was No. 1 in the Colonial Athletic Association in total defense (268.8 yards/game) and scoring defense (15.6 ppg). The Spiders also held 12 different opponents to fewer than 100 yards rushing and less than 20 points. Richmond's 29 interceptions in 2008 beat the school's previous single-season record of 20 set back in 1973.

Huesman's "Stonewall Defense" was most impressive in the 2008 national title game played in Chattanooga. His Spiders held the No. 4 Montana Grizzlies scoreless for three quarters, and just seven points total, in a 24–7 win.

=== Chattanooga ===
Huesman was named the University of Tennessee at Chattanooga football program's 22nd head coach on December 22, 2008.

Huesman led Chattanooga to its first SoCon title since 1984 and just its fifth in school history in 2013. He directed the Mocs to an overall record of 8–4, with a 6–2 mark in league play. UTC finished its season as the top defensive squad in the SoCon, leading the conference in scoring defense (20.4) and total defense (328.9).

The Mocs had a number of firsts in 2013, including the most wins ever in SoCon play. The eight wins are the most since 1980 and Chattanooga swept the league's Coach of the Year (Russ Huesman), Offensive Player of the Year (Jacob Huesman) and Defensive Player of the Year (Davis Tull) honors for the first time. The Mocs were nationally ranked for several weeks in 2013, finishing the year in the top 25 in both the FCS Coaches Poll (23) and The Sports Network Poll (21). It was the first time since 1984 that Chattanooga was listed in a year-ending national poll.

Huesman also became just the second UTC head coach be named SoCon Coach of the Year by his peers (Buddy Nix, 1990). Huesman took the honor for the second time, joining Joe Morrison as the only Mocs coaches to win multiple SoCon Coach of the Year honors. He was also a finalist for the Eddie Robinson Award as the National Coach of the Year.

The 2014 season saw the Huesman led Mocs build upon the previous season's success. Under Huesman's guidance, Chattanooga claimed an outright Socon Championship, top 8 seed into the FCS Playoffs and gained their first win in the FCS Playoffs in school history.

Since taking over in 2009, Chattanooga is 41–29 under Huesman. His 31 wins in the first 5 years eclipse the number of wins the Mocs had in the previous nine seasons combined. He has a 30–17 Southern Conference record since taking over the program.

=== Head coach at Richmond ===
After eight years at Chattanooga, Huesman was named head coach at the University of Richmond on December 14, 2016, returning to the school where he had previously spent five years as defensive coordinator.

== Head coaching record ==
Year	Team	Overall	Conference	Standing	Bowl/playoffs	TSN/STATS^{#}	Coaches^{°}
Chattanooga Mocs (Southern Conference) (2009–2016)
2009	Chattanooga	6–5	4–4	T–4th			
2010	Chattanooga	6–5	5–3	T–3rd			
2011	Chattanooga	5–6	3–5	T–6th			
2012	Chattanooga	6–5	5–3	T–4th			
2013	Chattanooga	8–4	6–2	T–1st		23	25
2014	Chattanooga	10–4	7–0	1st	L NCAA Division I Quarterfinal	8	8
2015	Chattanooga	9–4	6–1	T–1st	L NCAA Division I Second Round	9	8
2016	Chattanooga	9–4	6–2	T–2nd	L NCAA Division I Second Round	13	10
Chattanooga:		59–37	42–20				
Richmond Spiders (Colonial Athletic Association Football Conference) (2017–2022)
2017	Richmond	6–5	4–4	6th			
2018	Richmond	4–7	2–6	T–10th			
2019	Richmond	5–7	4–4	T–5th			
2020–21	Richmond	3–1	3–1	2nd (South)		15	14
2021	Richmond	6–5	4–4	T–4th			
2022	Richmond	9–4	6–2	T–3rd	L NCAA Division I Second Round	11	12
Richmond Spiders (Coastal Athletic Association Football Conference) (2023–2024)
2023	Richmond	9–4	7–1	T–1st	L NCAA Division I Second Round	15	22
2024	Richmond	10–3	8–0	1st	L NCAA Division I First Round	15	16
Richmond Spiders (Patriot League) (2025–present)
2025	Richmond	7–5	3–4	T–3rd			
2026	Richmond	7–5	5–4	5th			
Richmond:		66–46	46–30				
Total:		125–83					
National championship Conference title Conference division title or championship game berth
