= Scott Wachenheim =

American football player and coach (born 1962)

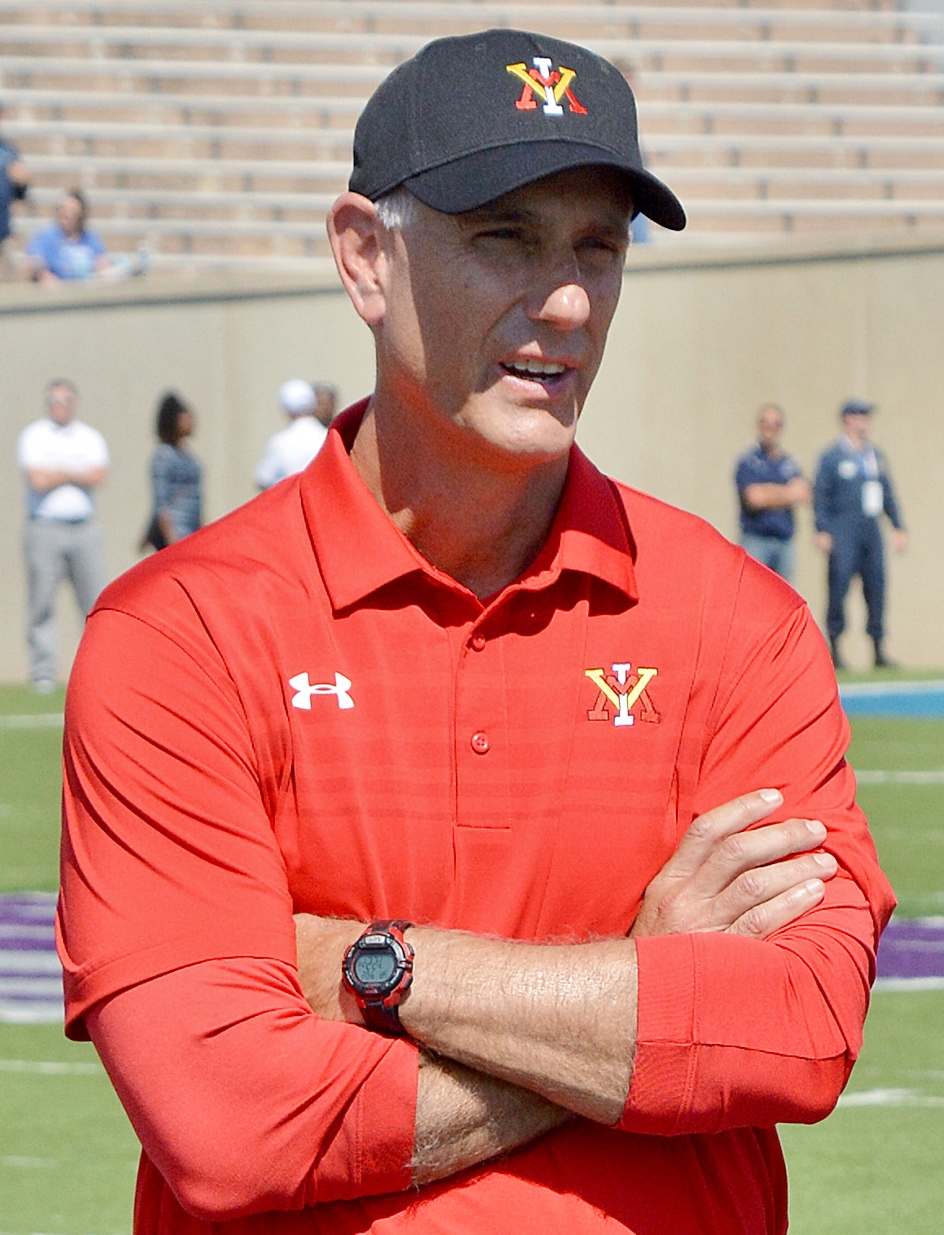
- Wachenheim in 2017 before a game at Air Force

Biographical details
- Born: August 13, 1962 (age 64); Encino, California, U.S.

Playing career
- 1980–1983: Air Force
- Position: Offensive lineman

Coaching career (HC unless noted)
- 1984–1985: Air Force (GA)
- 1989–1990: Arkansas (GA)
- 1991: Colorado (GA)
- 1992–1993: Utah State (OT/TE/RC)
- 1994–2000: Rice (OL)
- 2001–2005: Rice (OC/OL)
- 2006: Liberty (OC/OL)
- 2007–2008: Liberty (assistant HC)
- 2009: Washington Redskins (TE)
- 2010: Virginia (TE)
- 2011–2014: Virginia (OL)
- 2015–2022: VMI

Head coaching record
- Overall: 24–62

Accomplishments and honors

Championships
- 1 SoCon (2020)

Awards
- 2× SoCon Coach of the Year (2019, 2020); AFCA FCS Coach of the Year (2020); Eddie Robinson FCS Coach of the Year (2020); First-team All-WAC (1983)

Scott Allen Wachenheim (born August 13, 1962) is an American football coach. A graduate of the United States Air Force Academy, Wachenheim has been an assistant coach at various positions for nine different teams, ranging from the NCAA Division I FBS and FCS to a brief stint in the National Football League (NFL). Wachenheim was hired as the head coach of the VMI Keydets on December 14, 2014, replacing former bench boss Sparky Woods after seven seasons. Before that, he served as an offensive line coach at Virginia under Mike London for four seasons.

== Playing career ==
Wachenheim attended the United States Air Force Academy from 1980 to 1983 where he was a four-year starter on the football team. As an offensive lineman, Wachenheim garnered All-WAC honors in his senior season and was named as an honorable mention to All-America honors. During that season, the Falcons went 10–2 and were ranked second in the country in rushing offense. Wachenheim would earn a Bachelor's degree in Civil Engineering from Air Force in 1984, and became the offensive coordinator of the Air Force junior varsity football team as a graduate assistant before completing his obligatory military service.

== Coaching career ==
After serving in the Air Force, Wachenheim returned to coaching, working as an offensive tackles and tight ends coach for the Utah State Aggies in 1992. In his second season, Wachenheim was part of the Aggies' 1993 Big West championship team that won the second edition of the Las Vegas Bowl with a win over Ball State. The following season, Wachenheim joined Rice University for twelve seasons, serving under head coach Ken Hatfield. He was the Owl's offensive line coach for the first seven of those years, and was then promoted to the role of offensive coordinator in 2001.

Wachenheim then went on to serve as an offensive coordinator and offensive line coach at Liberty University, a former Big South Conference rival of VMI. Prior to the 2007 season, Wachenheim was upgraded by head coach Danny Rocco to the title of assistant head coach, and the Flames subsequently won two consecutive Big South championships in 2007 and 2008. In 2009, Wachenheim briefly moved up to the NFL coaching ranks, serving as the tight ends coach for the Washington Redskins. Though the Redskins went 4–12 that season, Wachenheim did work in the development of tight end Fred Davis, a second-round pick who caught 48 passes for 509 yards and six touchdowns. Wachenheim returned to college ball the following season, working with first-year head coach Mike London and his Virginia Cavaliers. Initially, Wachenheim coached tight ends in his first season at Virginia, but was designated to coach the offensive line in 2011, a position he held for four years. Under Wachenheim's guidance, four Cavalier linemen made NFL rosters: Morgan Moses of the Redskins, Luke Bowanko and Austin Pasztor of the Jacksonville Jaguars, and Oday Aboushi of the New York Jets.

On December 14, 2014, it was announced by VMI athletic director Dave Diles that the school had hired Wachenheim as head football coach. Wachenheim became the Institute's 31st all-time head coach, replacing Sparky Woods, who, in seven seasons, compiled a 17–62 record with the Keydets. Wachenheim led VMI to a 2020 SoCon title (with the season played in the spring of 2021, due to COVID-19) and a first-ever FCS playoff berth. That was followed by a 6-5 season in the fall of 2021.

On November 20, 2022, with his three-year contract extension expiring in a month, Wachenheim announced his decision to step down as head coach.

== Personal life ==
Wachenheim was born in Encino, California, and raised in nearby Woodland Hills, a suburb of Los Angeles. He and his wife, Karla, have two sons, Kyle and Tyson.

== Head coaching record ==
Year	Team	Overall	Conference	Standing	Bowl/playoffs
VMI Keydets (Southern Conference) (2015–2022)
2015	VMI	2–9	1–6	8th	
2016	VMI	3–8	1–7	8th	
2017	VMI	0–11	0–8	9th	
2018	VMI	1–10	0–8	9th	
2019	VMI	5–7	4–4	T-4th	
2020–21	VMI	6–2	6–1	1st	L NCAA Division I First Round
2021	VMI	6–5	4–4	T–4th	
2022	VMI	1–10	0–8	9th	
VMI:		24–62	16–46		
Total:		24–62			
