= Jacob Huesman =

American football player (born 1993)

Richmond Spiders
- Title: Co-offensive coordinator/quarterbacks coach

Personal information
- Born: February 27, 1993 (age 33)
- Listed height: 6 ft 1 in (1.85 m)
- Listed weight: 216 lb (98 kg)

Career information
- Positions: Quarterback, fullback
- High school: Baylor (Chattanooga, Tennessee)
- College: Chattanooga (2011–2015)
- NFL draft: 2016: undrafted

Career history

Playing
- Saskatchewan Roughriders (2016)*; New York Giants (2016)*
- * Offseason or practice squad member only

Coaching
- Richmond (2017) Graduate assistant; Georgia State (2018) Graduate assistant; Chattanooga (2019–2022) Tight ends coach; Richmond (2023) Quarterbacks coach; Richmond (2024) Pass game coordinator/quarterbacks coach; Richmond (2025–present) Co-offensive coordinator/quarterbacks coach

Awards and highlights
- 2× Second-team All-American (2014, 2015); 3× SoCon Offensive Player of the Year (2013–2015); 2× First-team All-SoCon (2014, 2015); Second-team All-SoCon (2013)
- Stats at Pro Football Reference

Jacob Andrew Huesman (born February 27, 1993) is an American football coach and former player. He played college football for the Chattanooga Mocs as a quarterback. He was a member of the New York Giants' practice squad as a fullback.

== Early life ==
Jacob Andrew Huesman was born on February 27, 1993. He played high school football at the Baylor School in Chattanooga, Tennessee, as a dual-threat quarterback. As a senior, he recorded 2,828 yards of total offense, 1,750 rushing yards, and 25 touchdowns. Huesman led the team to the Division II-AA state title game, and was named the Tennessee Titans Mr. Football Award winner for Division II-AA. He also participated in track and field in high school, earning all-state honors in the long jump his junior year.

== College career ==
Huesman played college football for the Chattanooga Mocs of the University of Tennessee at Chattanooga from 2012 to 2015, under his father, head coach Russ Huesman. He redshirted the 2011 season. He played in a school-record 50 games for the Mocs, starting 47 games at quarterback and one game at wide receiver. He finished his college career with totals of 743 completions on 1,104 passing attempts (67.3%) for 8,197 yards, 64 touchdowns, and 28 interceptions while rushing 788 times for 4,051 yards and 43 touchdowns. Huesman also caught 12 passes for 106 yards and one touchdown, and punted five times for 153 yards. He was the holder on special teams as well.

Huesman set school career records in completions, completion percentage, passing yards, passing touchdowns, carries, rushing yards, rushing touchdowns, total offense (12,248), total touchdowns (107), and starting quarterback wins (32–15). He became one of only two quarterbacks in Southern Conference (SoCon) history to accrue 4,000 passing yards and 4,000 rushing yards (the other quarterback was Armanti Edwards). Huesman was also one of only three quarterbacks in FCS history with 4,000 rushing yards while his 107 total touchdowns were the fourth most in FCS history.

Huesman was the first-ever three-time coaches SoCon Offensive Player of the Year; he was a coaches selection in 2013 and a consensus selection in both 2014 and 2015. He was named second-team All-SoCon in 2013, and first-team All-SoCon in 2014 and 2015. Huesman also earned SoCon All-Freshman Team (2012), Beyond College Sports second-team All-American (2014), STATS second-team All-American (2015), and SoCon Male Student-Athlete of the Year honors (2015) during his college career. His 68.5 completion percentage in 2014 led the FCS. Huesman graduated from Chattanooga with a business degree in December 2015.

== Professional career ==
Huesman was rated the 25th best quarterback in the 2016 NFL draft by NFLDraftScout.com. After going undrafted, he attended rookie minicamp on a tryout basis with both the Pittsburgh Steelers and Tennessee Titans.

On May 28, 2016, Huesman signed with the Saskatchewan Roughriders of the Canadian Football League as a quarterback. He "struggled" during the team's Green and White game, only completing two of five passes while also losing a fumble. He was released on June 6, 2016, and replaced with Phillip Sims.

Huesman increased his weight from 225 pounds to 240 pounds, and on December 27, 2016, he was signed to the practice squad of the New York Giants as a fullback, despite being new to the position. Huesman signed a reserve/future contract with the Giants on January 9, 2017. In 2017, he competed with undrafted rookie Shane Smith for the Giants' fullback position. After practices, Huesman also worked on long snapping with special teams coach Tom Quinn. Huesman played during the preseason games for the Giants on special teams. He was waived on September 2, 2017, before the start of the regular season.

== Coaching career ==
Huesman served as a counselor at the Manning Passing Academy in the summer of 2015. He began his collegiate coaching career in 2017 as a graduate assistant at Richmond under his father. He was then a graduate assistant at Georgia State in 2018, and the tight ends coach at Chattanooga from 2019 to 2022. In 2023, Huesman rejoined his father at Richmond as the team's quarterbacks coach. He was promoted to pass game coordinator/quarterbacks coach in 2024 and co-offensive coordinator/quarterbacks coach in 2025.
