= Impact of the September 11 attacks on the entertainment industry =

Impact of the September 11 attacks on entertainment

The September 11 attacks in the United States in 2001 had a significant impact on broadcast and venue entertainment businesses, prompting cancellations, postponements, and changes in content. In the United States and several other countries, planned television screenings of films and television shows depicting terrorism, plane crashes, bombs, or other related disasters as the primary subject were postponed or cancelled.

== Films ==
Numerous films that were in production were cancelled, some due to the aftermath of the September 11 attacks, which prevented the shooting or reshooting of some scenes. Many films that were filmed before the collapse were edited. There were various reasons given for the alterations, including keeping material up-to-date, as a gesture of respect for those who died, and to avoid trauma for those emotionally affected by the attack. There are also many films which were notably not edited.

Roughly 45 films were edited or postponed due to the September 11 attacks.

=== Edited films ===
==== With the World Trade Center removed ====
A teaser trailer for Spider-Man was recalled, as it featured Spider-Man capturing a helicopter filled with criminals in a web spun between the Twin Towers. A poster with the World Trade Center reflected in Spider-Man's eye was also recalled, while the film's short teaser trailer also removed the towers from Spider-Man's eye reflection. Sony removed any mentions of the Twin Towers from the teaser images and trailer on the website. A shot of the World Trade Center (WTC) was deleted from the film, but it can be found on the Sony Stock Footage website. The home video release of A Knight's Tale had the Spider-Man trailer removed as well. Two scenes were added to the film in response to the attacks: in the first, a group of New Yorkers attack the Green Goblin over the Queensboro Bridge, with one saying, "You mess with Spidey, you mess with New York!", and another saying "You mess with one of us, you mess with all of us!". The second, a scene of Spider-Man hanging onto a flagpole with a large American flag, was seen in later trailers and at the end of the film.

The WTC was digitally deleted from skyline shots in Zoolander, which was theatrically released nearly three weeks after the attacks. However, the Twin Towers were later restored for the 2016 Blu-ray release.

Don't Say a Word was theatrically released nearly three weeks after the attacks, and the filmmakers contemplated delaying its release, but decided against it. However, they cut out and replaced shots of the towers from the edit, such as the opening shot, which shows Brooklyn instead.

Men in Black II originally featured a climax that included the WTC, but the scene was changed to the Statue of Liberty.

Director Roger Michell had the WTC towers digitally removed from the opening main title sequence in Changing Lanes. In the DVD commentary, he admitted that it was a mistake to erase them and pretend they did not exist.

Shots of the World Trade Center were partially seen in Mr. Deeds: one was shot in the helicopter for the scene where Longfellow Deeds arrives in New York City, and one on the Upper West Side, which shows the entire Manhattan skyline. The towers were digitally removed in the scene where Deeds and Chuck Cedar play tennis, which was shot on Roosevelt Island in spring 2001.

Shots containing the World Trade Center were removed from Stuart Little 2, Serendipity, and Kissing Jessica Stein. Scenes of the WTC were also removed from People I Know, but they can be found on the DVD release in the deleted scenes featurette.

The scene in which the World Trade Center gets hit by meteors and catches fire was edited out of many television broadcasts of Armageddon after the attacks.

Home Alone 2: Lost in New York features a scene atop the WTC, which was edited out on several television channels. However, as of Christmas 2018, the scene with the WTC was restored.

==== Other changes related to the September 11 attacks ====
In the 2002 re-release of E.T. the Extra-Terrestrial, the dialogue "You're not going as a terrorist" (spoken by the mother) was replaced with "You're not going as a hippie."

In the ABC Family airing of Meet the Parents, the scene near the end in which Greg gets into an argument with the airline stewardess and his subsequent interrogation by an airline official was edited to remove all references to Greg mentioning the word bomb on the plane.

In Spy Game, the level of smoke shown following a bombing was reduced because of its similarity to the smoking WTC wreckage.

A scene in The Time Machine where debris from the destroyed moon crashes into a building was edited and delayed due to its resemblance to the attacks.

Lilo & Stitch originally showed Stitch, Jumba, Pleakley, and Nani hijacking a Boeing 747 to chase down Captain Gantu and rescue Lilo through the streets of Honolulu. However, this scene was altered to show them taking Jumba's spaceship and chasing Gantu around Hawaii's mountains. The original scene was included on the special edition DVD.

The scene in An Extremely Goofy Movie where Max saves Tank from a burning fire was edited in post-9/11 versions and Disney Channel due to the fire being too similar to the attacks. However, the original scene was still intact in the Disney+ version.

The Bourne Identity was extensively reshot due to the fear of the CIA as the antagonist being wrongly interpreted as anti-Americanism. Due to the insistence of Matt Damon and Doug Liman, the footage was not included. On the special edition DVD are descriptions of how and why the film was changed.

A scene in The Powerpuff Girls Movie resembling the tragedy, with people falling from a toppling building and being ultimately saved by the Powerpuff Girls, was rethought and adjusted to avoid making a direct reference to the World Trade Center.

Fox shelved previously scheduled airings of The X-Files and Independence Day on September 14 and 16, respectively. They were replaced by respective airings of Nine Months and There's Something About Mary. The Peacemaker, which was scheduled to air on ABC on the same day as Fox's Independence Day broadcast, was also pulled.

Die Another Day was originally going to end with a North Korean satellite attack on Manhattan, which was moved to the Korean Demilitarized Zone after the attacks.

Early versions of The Incredibles featured a scene where Mr. Incredible vents his emotions on an abandoned building, but ends up accidentally damaging a neighboring building as well. It was considered to be too reminiscent of the World Trade Center collapse and replaced with a scene where Mr. Incredible and Frozone rescue trapped civilians from a burning building.

Monsters, Inc. originally depicted the CDA blowing up a sushi restaurant as part of a decontamination effort. The scene was replaced with the restaurant being quarantined under a dome of plasma instead. The filmmakers described the decision to alter the film in the Blu-ray "round-table discussion" bonus feature.

The WTC was removed from the promotional poster for Sidewalks of New York, but the buildings remained in the film itself.

=== Delayed films ===
View from the Top was originally scheduled for Christmas 2001, but the release was pushed back to March 21, 2003, because the story revolves around a flight attendant on numerous planes.

Collateral Damage was postponed for four months after being slated for release October 5, 2001, and features a terrorist bombing in front of a Los Angeles building. The film later underperformed at the box office, grossing less worldwide than its reported production budget.

Training Day was originally scheduled for release on September 21, but was delayed to October 5.

The Time Machine was delayed by three months from its original December 2001 release because of an eventually deleted scene where a meteor shower destroys New York City.

Big Trouble was postponed seven months because it involved a nuclear bomb being smuggled on board an aircraft; it was slated for September 21.

The release date of Bad Company, December 25, 2001, was pushed several months because the plot involved a criminal mastermind planning to detonate a bomb in the Grand Central Terminal.

Gangs of New York was intended to be released on Christmas 2001, but its release was delayed until a year later due to the September 11 attacks.

Deuces Wild was slated for release in September 2001 but was pushed back due to the attacks and storyline concerning violence in New York, and was eventually released in May 2002.

Buffalo Soldiers premiered at the Toronto International Film Festival in September 2001, but its wide release was pushed back two years until 2003 due to war themes.

Windtalkers was originally slated for a Christmas 2001 release but was pushed back until June 2002 due to its war theme, and had depictions of violence re-edited.

Hart's War was originally planned for release in December 2001, but its release was postponed until February 2002 due to war themes.

=== Cancelled films ===
A Jackie Chan film called Nosebleed, about a window washer on the WTC who foils a terrorist plot, was due to start filming on September 11, 2001. Snopes questioned the suggestion that this was any kind of "narrow escape", pointing out the uncertain nature of film development and noting "it was almost certainly as part of a plan drawn up and abandoned long before September 2001".

James Cameron planned to make a sequel to True Lies, but canceled the project after the attacks, saying that "terrorism is no longer something to be taken lightly". 20th Century Fox Home Entertainment also scrapped plans to release the special two-disc collector's edition DVD of the original film after the attacks.

There were plans to have a sequel to Forrest Gump, but after the attacks, Eric Roth, Robert Zemeckis, and Tom Hanks said that the story was no longer "relevant" and it felt "meaningless".

Peter Berg had been set to direct heist film Truck 44 for Fox 2000 Pictures, which would have followed a group of FDNY firefighters who accidentally start a blaze in a ritzy Manhattan apartment building while robbing it, until Fox decided to shelve it in the wake of the attacks. In March 2002, Berg attempted to get the project restarted at Radar Pictures by rewriting it so it took place in Miami.

Columbia Pictures had scheduled Tick Tock, an action thriller written by Anthony Bagarozzi and Charles Mondry to be directed by Stephen Norrington and star Jennifer Lopez, to start production in January 2002, however, due to the plot centering around an FBI agent investigating an amnesiac man and his connection to a serial bomber targeting shopping malls in Los Angeles during Christmas, the movie was cancelled.

=== Non-altered films ===
Some films released after 9/11 kept scenes of the WTC in them.

Director Cameron Crowe retained shots of the buildings in the final cut of Vanilla Sky as a tribute despite the producers asking for them to be removed. Crowe told the Associated Press "The idea of wiping them away by the computer — I couldn't do it [...] They've already been taken away once; they'll stay in the movie. Hopefully, the audience will understand it's a tribute."

Godzilla, Mothra and King Ghidorah: Giant Monsters All-Out Attack, a Japanese film, features a battle sequence in Yokohama, Japan—filmed prior to September 11—wherein Godzilla's atomic breath strikes the Yokohama Landmark Tower, destroying its upper floors and killing those inside. During post-production, the producers briefly considered removing the scene due to concerns it could seem insensitive following the WTC collapse, but ultimately retained it unchanged in the theatrical release. The film's trailers also reduced emphasis on destruction imagery as a precaution.

Gangs of New York ends with the New York City skyline containing the Twin Towers. The filmmakers had filmed the shot before the 9/11 attacks and later debated whether to remove the towers, have the towers dissolve out from the shot to signify their disappearance, or to remove the sequence entirely.

== Television ==
=== News coverage ===
The television coverage of the September 11 attacks and their aftermath was the longest uninterrupted news event in U.S. television history, with the major U.S. broadcast networks providing continuous coverage for four consecutive days. From the moment reports emerged that the first plane had crashed into the North Tower of the World Trade Center, all scheduled programming and commercials were suspended, with all four networks broadcasting uninterrupted news coverage thereafter. At the end of the night, Nielsen estimated that at least 80 million Americans watched the evening news, while an estimate by the University of Georgia held that about two billion people either watched the attacks in real time or through the news.

The September 11 attacks were also the first time since the assassination of John F. Kennedy that television networks announced that there would be no television commercials or programs for an indefinite period of several days after the attacks, since it was widely felt that it was an inappropriate time for "fun and entertainment" programs to be shown when so much death and destruction were being seen live on television. During the week of the attacks, the networks' evening news broadcasts nearly doubled their average viewership audience, and it was estimated that American adults watched an average of eight hours of television every day, nearly doubling the average viewership audience. To keep up with the constant flow of information, many news networks began running continuous updates in a news ticker, which soon became a permanent fixture of many networks.

On the day of the attacks and afterwards, news broadcasters scrambled to report accurate information, though erroneous information was occasionally broadcast. An examination of CNN's coverage of September 11, 2001 (which was replayed online, virtually in its entirety, on the fifth anniversary of the attacks in 2006) revealed that after the attack on the Pentagon, the network had also reported that a fire had broken out on the National Mall, and that according to a wire report, a car bomb had exploded in front of the State Department. It also broadcast an interview with a witness to the Pentagon attack who said it was a helicopter (not a plane) that hit the building. CNN was not alone in airing these or similar inaccurate reports, as subsequent examinations of coverage by other networks have shown.

==== Reaction of various networks ====
===== United States =====
The major English language broadcast networks (ABC, CBS, and NBC) and two major Spanish language broadcasters (Univision and Telemundo) were in the last half-hour of airing their morning programs live in the Eastern and Central time zones: Good Morning America (ABC), The Early Show (CBS), Today (NBC), ¡Despierta América! (Univision), and Esta Mañana (Telemundo), respectively, at the time of the first attack. During the second attack, the networks had already suspended programming in all time zones to air special coverage from their respective news divisions: ABC News, CBS News, NBC News, Noticias Univision, and Noticias Telemundo. As Fox did not have a network morning program, many Fox affiliates began airing local news telecasts with coverage from Fox News. ABC, CBS, Fox, and NBC would air commercial-free live news coverage until September 15. Some affiliates broke away from network news coverage at certain times to air their regularly-scheduled local newscasts. The three major networks brought in their main evening news anchors to lead coverage within the hour: Peter Jennings took over from GMA at 9:12am; Tom Brokaw came in at 9:45am (though NBC's coverage continued under the purview of Today for several more hours); and Dan Rather went on-air at 10:00am, just seconds after the first tower fell.

In New York City, several stations provided local coverage of the World Trade Center attacks, though they also had to deal with the additional hamstring of their transmission facilities atop the World Trade Center being destroyed and six station engineers at the WTC being killed in the attacks. Outside WCBS-TV and Univision flagship WXTV (which maintained backup Empire State Building facilities) and the other major New York English commercial stations hastily made arrangements with other full-power and low-power stations in the market not based at the World Trade Center (including shifting coverage to otherwise commercial-free public television stations) to continue broadcasting their coverage over-the-air (cable television coverage was for the most part unaffected due to direct fiber connections from stations to Time Warner Cable and Cablevision; the attacks pre-dated the addition of local channels to direct-broadcast satellite providers, although the market’s four major English-language network-owned stations—WABC-TV, WNBC, WCBS and Fox-owned WNYW—were available as default network feeds and then-WB-affiliate WPIX likewise as a superstation to select satellite subscribers outside the New York area). WXTV relayed news in both Spanish and English to provide information to over-the-air viewers.

One station in Washington, D.C. (CBS affiliate WUSA) broadcast local coverage of the attack on the Pentagon to some criticism that the story's global scale was too overwhelming for WUSA to cover as strictly a local news event and they should have deferred to CBS News instead. CBS News coverage remained available in Washington, D.C. via WDCA, which at the time was owned-and-operated by UPN and also through CBS owned-and-operated station WJZ-TV in Baltimore, Maryland.

Smaller broadcast networks also altered their schedules. Most affiliates of The WB simulcast coverage transmitted at the network level from CNN. In general, the majority of UPN affiliates also aired CBS News's coverage of the events, though nine of the 10 UPN stations owned by Fox Television Stations (which were acquired from BHC Communications before the attacks, including KCOP-TV in Los Angeles), along with other UPN affiliates that did not air CBS News coverage, instead aired Fox News' coverage, with Secaucus, New Jersey-based WWOR-TV continuing New York-based local coverage; UPN resumed regular programming on September 13. Pax TV (later i: Independent Television, now Ion Television) aired coverage from NBC News, which had a close relationship with many of the network's affiliates at the time through news share agreements with local NBC affiliates. Most independent stations also suspended normal programming, but some independent stations continued to show their normal programming.

CNN was the first cable network to break the news of the first attack at 8:49am EDT, followed by CNBC at 8:50am, MSNBC at 8:52am, and Fox News Channel at 8:54am. The first of these, CNN, provided constant live coverage of 9/11's aftermath for almost three consecutive months. The network's overnight rebroadcasts were replaced with CNN International's coverage. All News Channel continued its usual "news wheel" format and provided updates when needed, albeit with the full half-hour devoted to the attacks rather than its typical general news format. The other major cable and satellite television networks in the United States reacted in four ways during the attacks:

- Some networks suspended their program lineup and simulcast the news coverage of their affiliated broadcast networks:
  - Disney-owned networks ESPN, ESPN2 (both of which Disney owned a stake in), and SoapNet aired coverage from ABC News (ESPN itself debated not carrying an edition of SportsCenter that day before deciding on a special edition dealing with how the sports world was affected).
  - MTV, VH1, CMT, BET, and TNN aired coverage from CBS News (which were all owned by the original Viacom then; VH1 itself simulcast WCBS-TV's coverage at several times through the week).
  - Turner Broadcasting System and AOL Time Warner-owned networks TBS, TNT, Shop at Home (owned by E. W. Scripps Company), Court TV, CNNfn, and CNNSI aired CNN coverage.
  - News Corporation-owned channels FX; some regional Fox Sports Net channels; The Health Network; Speedvision; and Fox Family (which would be acquired by Disney after the attacks) aired Fox News' coverage.
  - General Electric-owned CNBC (periodically with its business-impact coverage) simulcast sister network MSNBC and NBC's coverages itself.
  - C-SPAN and HSN, after initially suspending programming, simulcast coverage from the CBC's American cable news channel Newsworld International (which itself simulcast CBC at several times throughout the week; HSN and NWI were then under the same ownership).
  - Discovery Communications-owned TLC and BBC America aired coverage from BBC World News. Tribune Broadcasting's Superstation WGN simulcast coverage from their New York sister station WPIX.
  - Some local cable news channels also simulcast coverage from all the major national cable news networks (in the New York metropolitan area, NY1 and News 12 provided local coverage).
- Other networks stopped airing programs altogether, with a still card expressing sympathies being placed on screen. These networks included Food Network; HGTV; DIY; Lifetime; Oxygen; QVC; and Shop at Home (Food Network and Oxygen were then based in lower Manhattan, requiring them to halt all operations; Oxygen would redirect their satellite feed to NY1).
- Other channels continued their regular programming including Comedy Central; Discovery Channel; USA Network; TBN; A&E; The History Channel; Game Show Network; Sci Fi Channel; and Bravo. The Weather Channel also continued their regular programming, albeit with extra coverage of items of interest to their audience such as airport issues and ground travel delays due to the FAA's full-stop of all air operations. Children's cable networks, including PBS Kids, Nickelodeon, Noggin, Disney Channel, Cartoon Network, Toon Disney, and Boomerang retained their usual programming schedules, with some episodes removed due to violent or bomb-related imagery. Nickelodeon then aired a special episode of Nick News addressing the attacks on September 16.
- Premium channels such as HBO, Showtime, and Starz and their associated networks also retained their usual schedules, though triggering films with extreme violence and disaster films were quickly substituted with lighter fare.
- After departing from CBS News's continuous coverage, MTV decided to program a limited continuous loop of music videos, with no new videos being introduced for several weeks. The playlist included only light to mournful songs and videos, which included Destiny's Child's cover of "Emotion"; "I'm Like a Bird" by Nelly Furtado; and U2's "Stuck in a Moment You Can't Get Out Of".

Several PBS member stations and networks, such as Wisconsin Public Television, decided to air PBS Kids programming, even in primetime, outside of The NewsHour and other regular public affairs programming, to provide children with a safe harbor from the continuous news coverage of the attacks. Other PBS member stations and some non-commercial independent stations continued showing normal programming, though with some extended coverage if they carried foreign newscasts. Two New York area non-commercial stations with transmitter facilities away from the World Trade Center began to broadcast coverage from WTC-based commercial stations to allow those news operations to continue to broadcast; WLIW (with their transmitter in Plainview, Long Island) simulcast coverage from WNBC, while the city-owned WNYE (transmitting then from the Empire State Building), New Jersey Network, and Home Shopping station WHSE-TV simulcast coverage from WABC.

San Jose PBS member station KTEH was originally scheduled to broadcast a travel-related pledge drive on September 12, but it was initially postponed to a later date before being cancelled outright due to the attacks. In light of the attacks, KTEH relayed a message about the pledge drive's postponement during its programming schedule, which also included information regarding blood donations. Neon Genesis Evangelion and Serial Experiments Lain, which had aired on Sunday nights before the attacks, resumed on September 16 as originally planned.

===== International =====
- Australia: ABC along with the Seven, Nine, and Ten Networks carried live coverage from their American partner networks for several days after the attacks.
- Brazil: Rede Globo interrupted their children's television series Bambuluá for one minute and twenty-four second at 9:54am local time. Two minutes later, Bambuluá returned to the air, only to be cut off during the commercial break by another news bulletin. Carlos Nascimento, who was later joined by Ana Paula Padrão, hosted the news coverage, which included a special edition of the afternoon national newscast Jornal Hoje at 12:00 p.m., replacing the Praça TV local newscasts and the sports news show Globo Esporte. When the bulletin ended, Globo decided to restart its normal programming for the second time, with occasional breaks for the news division to announce updates about the situation. It ran a special edition of its evening newscast Jornal Nacional at 8:15 p.m. The program broke the record for most-watched newscast of the year. According to later released official numbers, for every 100 televisions being watched at the time, 74 were tuned into Jornal Nacional. The special edition had the usual anchor duo of William Bonner and Fátima Bernardes as hosts and had the participation of correspondents in New York (live), Washington DC, London and Beirut. Correspondent Jorge Pontual was praised by critics after a memorable report right by the WTC. In October 2002, that edition of the Jornal Nacional was nominated for the 30th International Emmy Awards. Other stations in the country such as Bandeirantes, RedeTV!, RecordTV (TV Record at the time) and the cable TV channel GloboNews also covered the attacks.
- Canada: CBC Newsworld broke into regular programming at 8:52am EDT to carry the first report of the attacks. CBC, Citytv, Global, and CTV provided English-language coverage of the attacks and its aftermath (including Operation Yellow Ribbon), while Télévision de Radio-Canada provided French-language coverage of the attacks; the Canadian versions of Food Network and HGTV stopped airing programs altogether, as their American parent channels had also halted operations.
- France: TF1 interrupted the American made-for-television movie Another Woman's Husband at 3:30pm local time for a thirty-minute simulcast with its news channel LCI, before newsreaders Patrick Poivre d'Arvor, Jean-Pierre Pernaut, Claire Chazal and Jean-Claude Narcy took turns to anchor the channel's news coverage, which ran until 0:05 am on September 12. France 2 started their special coverage at 3:33 pm, following the German series Die Kommissarin, with their newest anchorman David Pujadas and Daniel Bilalian taking their turn as presenters. France 2 tried to return to normal programming at 11:08pm local time, with the 2000 German television movie www.madechenkiller.de - Todesfalle Internet, but the channel returned to the newsroom at 0:14 am the next day, with the film returning to the air at 1:26 am. France 3 interrupted the 1988 American television movie Promised a Miracle at 3:49 pm, with Élise Lucet announcing the news. Promised a Miracle was then resumed at 4:03 pm, with France 3 returning to the newsroom at 4:46 pm, with Lucet alternating with Marc Autheman. The public channel's coverage ended at 10:35 pm. Canal+ continued with normal programming until 6:29 pm, when the channel simulcasted i>Télévision news coverage until 8:33 pm, which was presented by Bruce Toussaint, Marie Drucker and Charlotte Le Grix de la Salle. M6 first only made newsflashes between normal programming, before proposing a special edition of the 6 Minutes newscast, followed by a special programme at 9:02 pm, presented by Bernard de La Villardière and Laurent Delahousse. During nighttime programming, the channel simulcast CNN's news coverage.
- Germany: Both ARD and ZDF first announced the attack during their 3:00 pm local time regular newsflash, before both channels aired their usual programming. The first channel to interrupt normal programming was private channel RTL Television, when Peter Kloeppel broke into the game show Der Schwächste fliegt! at 3:09 pm. The channel would air their news special until 10:26 pm local time. ZDF then interrupted the court show Streit um drei twenty-five minutes later for a newsflash, before resuming the programme, which was cut off again fourteen minutes later. ProSieben, who broke into Andreas Türck's talk show one minute after ZDF's first programme interruption, then returned to normal programming at 5:58 pm local time, before proposing a simulcast with their news channel N24 from 8:02 pm. ARD then interrupted the nature documentary Abenteuer Wildnis at 3:32 pm for a three-minute newsflash, before the programme was cut off again thirteen minutes later. The channel's news coverage was presented by Claus-Erich Boetzkes and Ulrich Wickert, who both took their turns during the coverage. Boetzkes anchored the main 15-minute newscast of Tagesschau at 8:00 pm for the continuous coverage. The last main channel to break into normal programming was Sat.1, who launched their news coverage after another court programme, Richterin Barbara Salesch at 4.03 pm. The channel's news coverage ended at 9:05 pm, when they also joined N24's news special. VOX's first newsflash was shown at 4:54 pm local time, breaking into the American series 7th Heaven. They also made another news report at 5:17 pm, during the showing of Earth: Final Conflict. VOX's news special then started at 6:42pm local time, interrupting the cooking game show Kochduell. They ended the coverage at 10:14 pm. Meanwhile, Kabel 1 made their first newsflash during The Streets of San Francisco at 5:06 pm, before joining N24 as well twenty-two minutes later. RTL II joined its parent channel at 5:31 pm after an episode of the American sitcom Unhappily Ever After, before breaking away at 10:26 pm. Both VIVA and Viva Zwei suspended their programming for that day.
- Japan: In Japan, television channels such as Nippon TV; Fuji TV; TV Asahi; NHK; TV Tokyo; and TBS suspended coverage of the aftermath of the Myojo 56 building fire that had occurred 10 days before the attacks.
- Malaysia: Several television networks such as TV1, TV2, and TV3 continued their regular programming but the networks' news programs included news bulletins covering the World Trade Center attacks. Both networks had already provided the ongoing coverage of the 2001 SEA Games where that day's events were already concluded.
- Philippines: NBN was the first network to break the news on the broadcast of Teledyaryo at 9:00 pm local time and RPN immediately began its coverage from CNN when the American series The Practice was a couple of minutes to go from airing and suspended its regular programming. GMA followed the suit on the GMA News Live bulletin during the commercial break of the sitcom series Kool Ka Lang and appeared on a second bulletin an hour later during the commercial break of the crime drama series Kasangga. ABS-CBN joined the suit on the ABS-CBN News Advisory report during the commercial break of the horror fantasy series !Oka Tokat and again in Regal Presents. Studio 23 broke the news during the commercial break of the American series The Others, when the American comedy series Mad About You aired as scheduled following a special coverage of News Central presented by Mari Kaimo. Other television stations in the country such as IBC and ABC continued their regular programming but the networks' news programs included hourly news bulletins covering the attacks, having just reeling the aftermath of the Manor Hotel fire that had occurred three weeks before the attacks, and ZOE TV provided the coverage from CNBC, which was a broadcasting partner at the time. The two big networks, ABS-CBN and GMA, continued their respective programming as they aired the special telecasts of ABS-CBN Headlines presented by Tony Velasquez and Karen Davila, with Ces Datu, who provided the coverage from New York City, and Frontpage with Vicky Morales anchored the program, who substituted for Mel Tiangco, then both had to suspend its late night programming to begin continuous coverage of the attacks, ABS-CBN ended the coverage at 2:00 am local time on September 12 for its sign-off process, GMA continued it when Jessica Soho took over the telecast until 5:00 am local time. While ABS-CBN's cable news channel ANC interrupted the live telecast of Strictly Politics presented by Pia Hontiveros to break the live coverage and was followed on a special edition of The World Tonight presented by Angelo Castro Jr. and Tina Monzon-Palma.
- United Kingdom: BBC One started to simulcast BBC News 24's coverage at 2:10 pm BST, following the lunchtime showing of Neighbours. This continued until the BBC News at Six, presented by Huw Edwards, when it was moved to BBC Two (which aired some programmes cancelled by BBC One), where it would be when it aired usual programming from 7:30 pm to 8:30 pm BST, namely Eastenders and Changing Rooms. A hour news special, America Under Siege, which was presented by David Dimbleby followed the two shows, before a special edition of the BBC News at Ten, anchored by Peter Sissons was shown. Blanket news coverage resumed at 11:35 pm, when BBC One joined BBC News 24 one hour earlier than scheduled. BBC Two aired a extended edition of Newsnight, presented by Jeremy Vine, at 10:35 pm. ITV1 made its first news report after the first part of Crossroads ended. The coverage was first presented by Kirsty Young, who called her husband during the coverage. She was later joined by Sir Trevor McDonald, who co-presented with Young until 7:00 pm, when Emmerdale aired as scheduled. Young returned to the air after the soap opera, with a thirty-minute news special, which was followed by Who Wants to Be a Millionaire?. Another news special, this time with McDonald, aired after the game show. It was followed by regional news at 10:30 pm, and by highlights of that that's day UEFA Champions League games ten minutes later. Nightime programming was cancelled in favour of more news coverage and a simulcast of NBC's coverage.

Broadcasters in several other countries throughout South America, Europe, Africa, Asia, Oceania, and also the rest of North America also suspended regular programming to air news coverage of the attacks.

==== Use of pictures ====
When asked for her thoughts on the attacks, First Lady Laura Bush stated that "we need to be very careful about our children". She warned parents not to let their children see the frightening images of destruction in a constant loop and recommended that parents turn off the television and do something constructive, reassuring, and calming with their children.

=== Programming ===
The most immediate impact on television was the loss of David Angell, the co-creator and co-executive producer from the NBC show Frasier, where he and his wife, were passengers on American Airlines Flight 11.

In the United States, the start of the 2001–2002 television season was put on hold due to the extensive news coverage (several series, such as NBC's Crossing Jordan, were originally scheduled to debut on September 11), with mid-September premieres delayed until later in the month. Late-night talk shows such as The Tonight Show and Late Show with David Letterman were also off the air; Letterman was already dark for the week for a pre-season vacation. Even after regular programming resumed, several talk shows remained off the air for several more days as writers and hosts determined how best to approach the sensitive situation. David Letterman was quoted on CNN as questioning whether he would even continue hosting his show. Ultimately, Letterman, Jay Leno, Jon Stewart, and other talk show hosts based in New York and Los Angeles returned to the airwaves with emotional initial broadcasts, with Letterman punctuating his thoughts by asking his audience how the attacks "made any goddamn sense." This was the second of four instances where the start of the television season was delayed due to issues outside of the control of the major television networks; the other instances were the 1988–89 season (as a result of the 1988 Writers Guild of America strike), the 2020–21 season (due to television production being halted as a result of the COVID-19 pandemic), and the 2023–24 season (as a result of the 2023 Writers Guild of America strike and 2023 SAG-AFTRA strikes).

Several television series, most notably The West Wing and Third Watch, produced special episodes addressing the attacks; Third Watch devoted an episode to interviewing first responders, many of whom were advisors to the series, while West Wing presented an off-continuity episode in which the characters discuss an unspecified but similar attack with a group of students. South Park returned from its mid-season hiatus in November with the episode Osama bin Laden Has Farty Pants, which featured the main quartet of boys getting mistakenly shipped to Afghanistan and coming face-to-face with bin Laden, all with the show's usual irreverent comedy; for example, the way Cartman deals with bin Laden calls back to American propaganda cartoons produced during World War II that denigrated Germany and Japan. Law & Order and its spin-off series all began their fall season premieres with a tribute to the victims. Shows such as the military-based JAG and Third Watch (a series about New York City first responders) made major changes to their ongoing storylines to incorporate the event's aftermath. The season eight premiere of the NBC sitcom Friends was dedicated to the "people of New York City". Characters in the HBO crime drama The Sopranos discussed the attacks in several episodes, and the overall mood of the show became darker; the Twin Towers were also removed from the opening credits beginning with the fourth season. The HBO show Sex and the City removed the Twin Towers from its title sequence in the next season. Alias, a series set within the espionage world that debuted in the fall of 2001, began adding references to terrorism and the Department of Homeland Security (an entity created after 9–11).

On September 17, 2001, Politically Incorrect host Bill Maher's guest Dinesh D'Souza disputed President George Bush's label of the terrorists being "cowards", saying that the terrorists were warriors. Maher agreed and, according to a transcript, replied, "We have been the cowards, lobbing cruise missiles from 2,000 miles away. That's cowardly. Staying in the airplane when it hits the building, say what you want about it, it's not cowardly." The comments were widely condemned, and the show was cancelled the following June, which Maher and many others saw as a result of the controversy; however, ABC denied that the controversy was a factor, and said the show was cancelled due to declining ratings. Maher said that the show struggled for advertisers in its final months.

Family Guy creator and animator Seth MacFarlane was going to board Flight 11 to Los Angeles, but missed his flight due to drunkenness the night before.

==== Delayed or cancelled entertainment awards shows ====
The 53rd Annual Primetime Emmy Awards, scheduled for September 16, were delayed to October 7. However, the United States began to bomb Afghanistan on that day, and the ceremony was again postponed. They finally aired on November 4, with a somewhat somber atmosphere after surviving rumors of cancellation. Due to the delay, the event was relocated from the originally scheduled Shrine Auditorium venue to the smaller Shubert Theatre. The 2006 drama Studio 60 on the Sunset Strip featured flashbacks to this time, where two of the characters on the show were fictionally nominated for awards at this event.

The 2nd Annual Latin Grammy Awards, which was scheduled for September 11, was cancelled immediately after the attacks. After many discussions about rescheduling the ceremony, The Latin Recording Academy determined it would be impossible to do so. Instead, the winners were announced at a press conference on October 30 at the Conga Room. The cancellation of the event cost the organizers an estimate of $2 million in losses. Some of the winners were acknowledged at the 44th Grammy Awards. Furthermore, the attacks influenced the National Academy of Recording Arts and Sciences to hold the 2003 Grammy Awards ceremony in New York City as part of the "healing process".

The postponements and cancellations of various entertainment programs sparked rumors that the Academy of Motion Picture Arts and Sciences was postponing or even cancelling the 74th Academy Awards ceremony. However, in a written statement released by President Frank Pierson, he denied any rumors that the attacks would affect the scheduling of the awards presentation, saying that "the terrorists will have won" if they cancelled it. Nevertheless, the show went on as planned on March 24, 2002. The security was much tighter than in previous years, and the show had a more somber tone. According to New York Magazine, there were 26 references to the attacks during the telecast. On October 16, 2006, the awards event itself was designated a National Special Security Event by the United States Department of Homeland Security.

Reflecting the significant and enduring impact of September 11 on popular culture, months and years after the attacks, events were still impacted, with the 2003 Grammy Awards being held at Madison Square Garden instead of Staples Center as planned. Blockbuster Entertainment terminated their awards ceremony permanently shortly after the second delay of the Emmys.

==== Other changes ====
13 of the first 30 episodes of Power Rangers Time Force had some of their footage edited after 9/11 due to scenes sharing a higher resemblance to the attacks.

The Absolutely Fabulous episode "Paris" had a joke about the Taliban's destruction of the Buddhas of Bamiyan removed from its original broadcast on September 14, 2001. However, the material was restored on home media and streaming versions of the episode.

The second episode of the first season of The Amazing Race was originally scheduled to air on September 12, but was delayed to September 19 as CBS cleared the week's schedule to cover 9/11's aftermath. Host Phil Keoghan admitted that he doubted the show would be renewed since he didn't believe there would be demand for a reality show centered on traveling in the immediate aftermath. Casting director, Lynne Spillman and television producer, Ghen Maynard, however, stated that they believed the series acted as a celebration of the modern world, the joys of travel, and a chance to see different cultures and were confident it would last. In addition, the second season was in process of location scouting in September 2001, but it was paused until late October. That season's filming was initially planned to start in November 2001 but was delayed to January 2002.

The third season of Survivor was initially planned to premiere in mid-September, but was delayed to October 11th. In addition, the fourth season (which would be filmed from November to December 10th) was initially planned to take place in Jordan. The producers had scouted the area for months, planned challenges, and had been cleared for filming by King Abdullah II, who personally approved of the project. After 9/11, producer Mark Burnett deemed the political climate in the Middle East to be too tense and the filming location was changed to the Marquesas Islands in French Polynesia.

The 101 Dalmatians: The Series episode, "Alive N' Chicken", was pulled from circulation due to a scene centering around Spot Chicken flying a contraption into a windmill with the Dalmatians on top with the contraption falling into a sack of flour. The episode, along with the followup episode "Prima Doggy", had been removed from circulation until June 2020, when the show became available on Disney+.

In the Friends episode "The One Where Rachel Tells...", Chandler and Monica could not get on their flight for their honeymoon because Chandler joked about a bombing at the airport. After the attacks, the story was rewritten and re-shot. As the show was set in New York, a caption reading "Dedicated to the People of New York City" was added to the end of the episode "The One After 'I Do'", which was the first episode of the series to be broadcast after the attacks. In several subsequent episodes, Joey and other members of the crew are seen wearing NYPD and FDNY apparel; Joey is seen wearing a T-shirt that says "Captain Billy Burke", referring to an NYC firefighter who died in the attack.

The opening credits of The Sopranos's first three seasons featured a shot of the Twin Towers visible in Tony Soprano's side-view mirror. It was replaced with two shorter generic shots beginning in the show's fourth season.

New material was quickly added to PBS's Sesame Street following the attacks to address issues raised. The first episode of season 33, which debuted in February of the following year, involves a grease fire at Hooper's Store, which traumatizes Elmo until he meets some real-life firefighters. In another episode written after the attacks, Big Bird has to deal with his xenophobic pen pal Gulliver, who does not believe birds should be friendly to other species.

The syndicated version of the Married... with Children episode "Get Outta Dodge" features a scene of two Arabs with a ticking bomb at the front door of Al Bundy's house offering to buy his Dodge clunker car for $40 and asking for directions to the Sears Tower. It was pulled after the attack.

Law & Order: Special Victims Unit had their opening credits modified at the start of their third season on September 28 to remove an establishing shot of the World Trade Center.

A shot of the New York City skyline in the opening montage of Saturday Night Live was altered to remove the Twin Towers when the new season began on September 29. A shot of an American flag was also added.

The Simpsons episode "The City of New York vs. Homer Simpson", which premiered roughly four years before the attacks and was partially set at the World Trade Center, was temporarily pulled from syndication by some carriers. The episode returned to syndication in 2006.

In the Family Guy episode "Road to Rhode Island" (which aired a year before the attacks), Osama bin Laden distracts a security guard at the airport while the X-ray machine detects weapons. This scene was cut after the September 11 attacks and was also removed from the Family Guy: Volume 1 DVD; however, the episode remains intact on the Family Guy: The Freakin' Sweet Collection DVD. The episode "A Fish out of Water" was originally scheduled to premiere on September 12, but was delayed to September 19 following the attacks.

Although Frasier made no explicit mentions of 9/11, a large American flag can be seen hanging by the windows in some of the post-9/11 episodes.

The King of the Hill episodes "Propane Boom" and "Death of a Propane Salesman" were temporarily pulled from syndication for the remainder of September, due to the depiction of the explosion of the Mega Lo Mart and the aftermath that followed, both episodes later returned to syndication in October 2001. Similarly, one station pulled the King of the Hill episode "Dog Dale Afternoon" due to Dale Gribble causing panic and hysteria inside a clock tower, which the syndicator viewed as too inappropriate during a time when America was in danger. That episode returned to syndication in October 2001.

The SpongeBob SquarePants episode "Just One Bite" originally featured a scene in which Squidward Tentacles attempts to get to the "Patty Vault" by bypassing the Krusty Krab's security system, which consists of a bucket of gas and a match that eventually burns him. Despite this scene being removed after the episode's initial broadcast on October 5, 2001, it remains distributed internally among the fanbase. The episode re-aired in 2002 with the original scene replaced by a zoom-in towards the "Patty Vault" in the back of the Krusty Krab. This change was initially thought to have been made either out of respect for the victims of the September 11 attacks (which occurred less than a month before the episode aired) or to prevent children from attempting to use or ignite gas. However, in 2018, Vincent Waller confirmed on Twitter that it was ultimately due to Nickelodeon, the show's network, being against the idea of a gag involving a match and gasoline. However the original version of the episode still airs on YTV in Canada.

The Invader Zim episode "Door to Door" was edited to remove some scenes of a burning city after an Irken invasion, with the Statue of Liberty being shown floating in water. The episode was also delayed from its original scheduled airdate of September 14, 2001 due to the attacks; it was replaced on the schedule that evening with The Fairly OddParents. While the unedited version of the episode was aired in Australia, only the edited version has been released on DVD.

The Nickelodeon live program Slime Time Live had its entire taping schedule canceled for the rest of the week ending September 14, 2001.

The Malcolm in the Middle episode "Malcolm's Girlfriend" originally had a subplot where Francis took refuge with a mad bomber in a remote Canadian cabin. The episode was to have guest-starred Stacy Keach and the storyline was supposedly filmed, but due to the September 11 attacks, it had to be re-filmed with a subplot involving Francis in an Alaskan prison, witnessing a live soap opera.

The Only Fools and Horses episode "The Sky's The Limit" was temporarily removed from repeat showings due to the final scene showing a plane nearly crashing into the Nelson Mandela House.

According to the outtakes of Lizzie McGuire season 2, the director and other crew members put a flag sticker on the clapperboard during production as a tribute to the victims.

Sex and the City had a theme change where the Empire State Building replaced the Twin Towers as the opening credits, with the name of Sarah Jessica Parker being shown.

The Zeta Project was almost cancelled after the first season due to the events of 9/11. The second season was made on the caveat that the producers cut all mentions of terrorism from the series and make it lighter in tone.

==== Non-altered shows ====
Reruns of Wheel of Fortune showed the Twin Towers on Game Show Network, especially the nighttime scene, during the opening.

In the Courage the Cowardly Dog episode "Campsite Of Terror", the Twin Towers appear between two dinosaur monsters in New York within a movie that Muriel and the raccoons are watching.

== Music and radio ==
Program directors from radio stations throughout the United States retooled their playlists in response to the attacks. Common changes included the heavy rotation of songs such as "God Bless the USA" by Lee Greenwood and Whitney Houston's rendition of "The Star-Spangled Banner" from Super Bowl XXV. Meanwhile, songs such as U2's "Sunday Bloody Sunday", Drowning Pool's "Bodies", and Dave Matthews Band's "Crash Into Me" were excluded from playlists. Additionally, Clear Channel (now known as iHeartMedia) came under scrutiny for distributing a list of 150 potentially sensitive songs that were not recommended for broadcast immediately after the attacks, including every Rage Against the Machine song.

NPR's weekly comedic news quiz show Wait Wait... Don't Tell Me! did not record or broadcast a show for the weekend of September 15–16.

Christian rap metal band P.O.D. released their album Satellite on September 11, 2001, spurring success for the album and its lead single "Alive", which was seen as having a positive message in the aftermath of the attacks. Other bands associated with genres such as nu metal and rap metal experienced a downturn in sales due to the attacks; these genres continued to decline in popularity in the following years.

blink-182's music video for "Stay Together for the Kids" depicts the band performing inside a suburban house as it is gradually demolished, reflecting the song's themes of divorce and family conflict. Filmed at a house in Orange County, California that was scheduled for demolition, the video employed elaborate cinematography and special effects. Because production coincided with the September 11 attacks, the band became concerned that its imagery of destruction could be misinterpreted. Label MCA later re-edited the video and added an opening statistic about divorce to clarify its intended metaphor.

Thrash metal band Slayer released their album God Hates Us All on September 11, 2001. Due to the album's name and its lyrical themes and content, it has been interpreted by some as a premonition of the attacks.

According to Arrogant Worms band member Trevor Strong, the song "Worst Seat on the Plane" was never performed live due to Idiot Road (the album it was featured on) being released on September 18, 2001.

American alternative rock band Jimmy Eat World voluntarily changed the name of their album Bleed American, which was released on July 18, 2001, out of concern that the title may be misinterpreted. It was re-released as the eponymous Jimmy Eat World, and its title track was renamed "Salt Sweat Sugar". In 2008, a deluxe version of the album was released, reverting both the album and song to their original Bleed American title.

On August 6, 2001, American pop-punk band Sugarcult released their debut single "Stuck in America" from their debut album Start Static, which contained the lyrics "everybody’s talking about blowin’ up the neighborhood" and "everybody's gonna watch it burn today". After September 11, radio stations started dropping the song. Sugarcult changed the lyric "Everybody’s talking about blowin’ up the neighborhood" to "everybody’s talking about wakin’ up the neighborhood" out of sensitivity.

Hungarian composer Robert Gulya, who lived in the United States from 2000 to 2002, began to work on a guitar concerto shortly after the September 11 attacks. Gulya chose a theme for the concerto's first movement, which is reminiscent of the terror attacks.

The cover artwork of Dream Theater's live album Live Scenes from New York, released on September 11, 2001, originally depicted the skyline of New York City, including the World Trade Center, silhouetted in flames. The album was recalled and re-released with a different cover. Dream Theater's 2005 studio album Octavarium includes the song "Sacrificed Sons", which is about the attacks and their aftermath. Dream Theater keyboardist Jordan Rudess performed a solo benefit concert three days after the attacks, which was released as the album 4NYC a year later. The band changed the title of one song from their 2002 album Six Degrees of Inner Turbulence. "The Great Debate", which discusses stem-cell research controversies, was originally titled "Conflict at Ground Zero" after a lyric in its chorus, but the title was changed as news reports began to refer to the site of the attacks as "Ground Zero". The band was in a Manhattan studio conducting final mixes of Six Degrees of Inner Turbulence on the day of the attacks.

English rock band Bush changed the name of the lead single off their 2001 album Golden State from "Speed Kills" to "The People That We Love". Also changed was the original cover art for the album, which featured a commercial airplane.

The San Francisco Symphony continued with a previously planned program of Mahler's 6th Symphony, the "Tragic," on September 12–15. The subsequent recording was highly acclaimed and garnered the 2003 Grammy Award for Best Orchestral Performance.

Janet Jackson postponed a concert in Tampa, Florida, scheduled for the day, and cancelled the entire European leg of her All for You Tour due to travel concerns after the attacks. Her brother, Michael Jackson, reportedly had a meeting planned at the World Trade Center but overslept in a hotel at the time.

Before the 9/11 attacks, American DJ and media personality Khaled Mohamed Khaled often referred to himself as "DJ Khaled - The Arab Attack" before dropping the tag line out of concern about offending victims.

The American compact disc release of The Strokes' debut album, Is This It, was delayed from September 25 to October 9 and had its track list amended, with the song "New York City Cops" being removed and replaced with the newly written track "When It Started".

Alternative rock band Enon had been set to release their upcoming second studio album in September 2001, but their label, SeeThru Broadcasting, decided to close following the 9/11 attacks in New York. Enon temporarily released their second instrumental album, "On Hold" in late 2001 to compensate fans for waiting. Enon signed with the Chicago-based indie label, Touch and Go Records after the closing of SeeThru, releasing their second studio album High Society in June 2002, after around half a year of limbo.

Hip-hop band The Coup's album Party Music originally featured art depicting two of the band's members apparently bombing the World Trade Center, and was scheduled for release in September 2001. The album was delayed to November so the band could create new cover art.

In London, the last night of the BBC Proms summer concert series, on Saturday September 15, was greatly toned down from its usual noisy and bombastic celebration, with major program revisions including the removal of John Adams's Short Ride in a Fast Machine.

The music video of the song "Piece by Piece" by Welsh band Feeder was changed. The original video depicted animated characters of the band playing in a New York skyscraper with the World Trade Center in the background and planes flying nearby, also features those characters jumping from the building and shows the way down. The new video shows the band on a Train Station on England while the song is played.

The lyrics for Sean Altman's a capella song "Zombie Jamboree" was changed from "There's a high-wire zombie between the World Trades" to "There's an accapella zombie singing down Broadway".

== Theme parks ==
The Walt Disney World attraction The Timekeeper, a 360-degree film presentation at Magic Kingdom that featured a panoramic view of New York City (including the Twin Towers) closed on September 11, 2001, and updated the scene of New York City so that the titular character was sent to 2000, a year before the attacks, which caused all references to the WTC to be removed. The attraction closed five years later.

The green screen stunt performance for explosions in New York City in the initial version of the pre-show of Armageddon – Les Effets Speciaux at Walt Disney Studios Park at the Disneyland Paris resort was replaced by a surfing stunt performance due to the attacks.

== Sports ==
=== Cancellations ===
Major League Baseball (MLB) Commissioner Bud Selig called off games for one day, extended cancellations for three days, then eventually postponed all games through September 16, 2001. The New York Mets' home series against the Pittsburgh Pirates from September 17–19 was moved to Pittsburgh due to security concerns, with the Mets functioning as the series' designated home team. The games were tacked onto the end of the regular season, delaying the postseason until October 9. As a result, the 2001 World Series became the first World Series to extend into November. This was the third time in MLB history that games were cancelled due to war or national security reasons. Games were previously cancelled on D-Day, and the 1918 season was shortened due to World War I.

All Minor League Baseball championship series were cancelled. Teams that had led their respective series were awarded league championships, or teams which were scheduled to play in such series (such as the Midwest League, which utilizes half-season championships to position the championship series) were awarded co-championships.

Major League Soccer (MLS)'s final two weeks of the 2001 season were cancelled, with some teams only playing 26 or 27 matches instead of the planned 28. The playoffs, whose spots were already decided, were played as scheduled, beginning on September 20 and ending with the MLS Cup on October 21.

The remaining three matches of the 2001 Women's U.S. Cup, featuring the United States women's national soccer team, were cancelled.

NCAA Division I college football games originally scheduled to be played on September 13 and 15 were called off.

USA Cycling cancelled the BMC Software Tour of Houston, a key event in that year's Pro Cycling Tour that had been scheduled for September 16. The decision was made in spite of athletes, staff, and equipment being actively en route to Houston from the inaugural San Francisco Grand Prix, which was held on September 9.

The Félix Trinidad vs. Bernard Hopkins world Middleweight championship boxing fight, which was to take place on September 15 at Madison Square Garden in New York, was postponed until September 29 due to the attacks. Also, a wrestling show was cancelled at the Madison Square Garden around the same date.

=== Delays ===
In the wake of the attacks, the National Football League (NFL)'s week 2 games (September 16 and 17) were postponed and rescheduled to the end of the regular season (the weekend of January 6 and 7, 2002). The playoffs began 5 days later on January 12 and ended on February 3, 2002, with the Super Bowl, making it the first time the NFL's championship game was played in the month of February.

The UEFA Champions League and UEFA Cup matches that were scheduled for September 12 and 13 were postponed to October 10 and September 20, respectively. Matches scheduled on September 11 proceeded for logistical reasons, with a minute's silence observed and black armbands worn at the matches.

World Wrestling Entertainment, then named the World Wrestling Federation, had a live taping scheduled for the upcoming episode of SmackDown! on September 11, however, due to the day's events, the taping was delayed until September 13 in Houston, Texas. The live episode of SmackDown was the first large public assembly since the attacks.

NASCAR delayed the 2001 New Hampshire 300, moving the race (and the entire weekend) from September 16 to November 23. Several cars ran American flag themed liveries for the following race at Dover, which was won by Dale Earnhardt Jr..

=== Not delayed ===
The 2001 American Memorial was a Championship Auto Racing Teams motor race held four days after the attacks at the EuroSpeedway Lausitz. It was not delayed, but was renamed from "German 500" by CART following the aftermath of the attacks.

Formula One's governing body, the Fédération Internationale de l'Automobile, announced that the 2001 Italian Grand Prix would proceed as scheduled. Ferrari president Luca di Montezemolo said that his team would approach the race as a normal racing event instead of a traditional Ferrari festival. Furthermore, di Montezemolo stated Formula One should continue its normal schedule and not cancel races. The Automobile Club d'Italia urged fans and spectators to behave "in keeping with the gravity of the situation and in collective participation in the pain of American citizens." Podium celebrations were cancelled and all pre-race ceremonies including a flypast by the Italian Tricolour Arrows display team were called off. Three teams altered their car's liveries as a mark of respect. Ferrari stripped their cars of all advertising and painted their nose cones black, Jaguar fitted black engine covers to their R2 cars on Saturday morning, and Jordan sponsor Deutsche Post replaced its branding with the American flag on the Jordan cars' engine covers on Sunday morning. Michael Schumacher was reluctant to take part in the race, and said in 2002 that he felt it was a "bad sign" to be driving after the September 11 attacks.

== Video games ==
The release of blockbuster title Grand Theft Auto III was delayed almost a month to make last-minute changes, since the game was set in a city loosely based on New York City. Development was also delayed due to Rockstar's offices being based near Ground Zero. The paint scheme of the city's police cars was changed from a blue-and-white design reminiscent of the New York City Police Department to a black-and-white design reminiscent of the Los Angeles Police Department. Other relatively minor changes included altering an AI plane's flight path which went near skyscrapers, and removing a few lines of pedestrian dialogue and talk radio.

Microsoft announced after the attacks that future versions of Microsoft Flight Simulator would not include the Twin Towers in the New York City skyline.

Command & Conquer: Red Alert 2 also received post-attack packaging changes: Electronic Arts repackaged the game and offered retailers revised box art after the original cover showed a plane heading toward the World Trade Center.

Syphon Filter 3's cover art was changed before release. It originally had Gabe Logan, viewed from an angle, pointing a gun at the camera with a look of anger while Lian swung into frame, guns a-blazing and with the American flag prominently displayed. It was changed to a generic head-view of Gabe and Lian.

Activision delayed the release of Spider-Man 2: Enter: Electro in order to remove the Twin Towers and 9/11 references.

Neversoft quickly edited the Airport level in Tony Hawk's Pro Skater 3 a month prior to its release as it previously depicted a terrorist plot involving a bombing of a passenger airplane. The terrorists were instead reskinned as pickpockets and certain objectives renamed for sensitivity reasons.

An art designer for the PlayStation 2 game Ace Combat 04: Shattered Skies realized an image that was about to release on the game's promotional website, depicting a battleship sinking near a populated cityscape, looked similar to the smoke plume from the Twin Towers' collapse. The designer discussed this with the staffer in charge of the website, and erased the city buildings from the image. Namco also suspended its broadcast of a Japanese TV spot for the game.

Eternal Darkness: Sanity's Requiem was delayed as Joseph De Molay, a Templar Knight during the crusades, was removed from the game. Textures that had Arabic writing were also removed.

Metal Wolf Chaos was not localized into other languages and remained unreleased outside of Japan due to the political climate that followed the attacks. However, it was eventually re-released worldwide as Metal Wolf Chaos XD in 2019.

Metal Gear Solid 2: Sons of Liberty, a blockbuster title which was released in North America and Japan two months after the attack, featured the Pentagon and the World Trade Center during its climax. After the Sept. 11 attacks, a scene showing the destruction of the Statue of Liberty and parts of Manhattan was cut from the game. Dialogue about terrorists targeting Manhattan was also removed.

The Game Boy Advance game Advance Wars was delayed in Europe, Japan, and Australia after having been released in North America. The game would release in Australia in 2001, Europe in 2002, and Japan in 2004.

The Dreamcast game Propeller Arena was completed and due to be released on September 19, 2001, but was cancelled and never officially released. The video game was about dogfighting in planes and one level takes place around a city of skyscrapers.

The Xbox launch game Project Gotham Racing depicted the World Trade Center in the background on its initial box cover art, which was already printed to retailers as display cases. After the attacks, the artwork was altered before the game was released.

The PlayStation 2 game Savage Skies was originally conceived as a licensed tie-in game based on the music and likeness of heavy metal musician Ozzy Osbourne under the name Ozzy's Black Skies with a song written specifically for the game called "Black Skies". Developer iRock Interactive was later forced to drop the Osbourne branding and retool the game as Savage Skies both due to concerns about the game's original title and premise being in poor taste in the aftermath of the attacks as well as licensing expenses, finally releasing the game in 2002; Osbourne would later include the song "Black Skies" as a bonus track on the single "Dreamer".

During its development, Half-Life 2 featured an airplane crashing into a high-rise apartment, which was cut following the attacks.

In 2025, an Easter egg in the hidden credits screen for E.T.: Interplanetary Mission – which insulted Osama bin Laden – was discovered by researchers. Commentators described the hidden message as an example of popular political sentiment immediately after the attacks.

== Other ==
An advertisement published in 1979 (22 years before 9/11), in several French magazines for Pakistan International Airlines and their flights between Paris and New York showed a photograph of a flying jetliner's shadow projected onto the Twin Towers. When this image was rediscovered on the internet in the years after the attacks, it was noted for its coincidental use of imagery invoking the attack, particularly for the fact that Osama bin Laden hid in Pakistan and was later shot and killed there in 2011.

Mad magazine's issue No. 411 was already at the printer with a gag front cover depicting the mascot Alfred E. Neuman having taken a wrong turn away from the New York Marathon route (an event occurring in October, when the issue was to be released) and jogging into a murder scene, where he cluelessly broke through yellow crime scene tape in triumph. The cover, which depicted downtown Manhattan and a corpse, was no longer appropriate in light of the September 11 attacks, but the magazine had just one deadline day to produce a replacement cover. This was accomplished with a closely cropped headshot of Neuman, with his trademark tooth gap filled in by a small American flag.

The 2001 Boshears Skyfest was cancelled due to closed airspace following the attacks.

Broadway theatre went dark until September 13, 2001, when shows resumed with dimmed marquees.

Toys "R" Us in Times Square sold a Barbie doll exclusive to this location in 2001. The initial release featured a depiction of the Twin Towers on its packaging, but was revised to remove them following the September 11 attacks.

Mattel's Max Steel toyline was censored in its packaging after customers noticed a similarity between the action figure of the Max Steel villain, Vitriol, and the 9/11 attacks; the description of the back of the box included Vitriol’s plan to attack the World Trade Center, which was worsened by the fact that the character was labeled a terrorist. The back of the box was later censored by Mattel, as were other action figures at the time such as Max Steel himself and the cyborg villain Psycho, who was also labeled a terrorist, with a toy helicopter being removed from US stores as well.

George Carlin's 17th album and twelfth HBO stand-up special, Complaints and Grievances, originally given the working title I Kinda Like It When a Lot of People Die, was heavily reworked and retitled following the September 11 attacks.

== See also ==
- List of cultural references to the September 11 attacks
- Cultural influence of the September 11 attacks
