= Van the man =

Van the man may refer to:

- Van Johnson, MGM actor, title of article "Van, the Man," Movieland 14 (August 1956)
- Van Morrison, a singer and songwriter from Belfast, title of "Van the Man" bootleg album
- Ruud van Nistelrooy, a retired Dutch footballer who played for Manchester United and Real Madrid
- National Lampoon's Van Wilder, a movie starring Ryan Reynolds, Kal Penn and Tara Reid
- Robin van Persie, a football player for Manchester United and the Netherlands
