= Start Static =

Studio album by Sugarcult
- Released: August 21, 2001
- Recorded: March–April 2001
- Studio: Rumbo (Canoga Park, California)
- Genre: Pop-punk; pop rock; power pop
- Length: 36:34
- Label: Ultimatum
- Producer: Matt Wallace; Ben Davis

Sugarcult chronology
Wrap Me Up in Plastic (2000)	Start Static (2001)	Palm Trees and Power Lines (2004)

Singles from Start Static
- 1. "Stuck in America" Released: August 6, 2001; 2. "Bouncing Off the Walls" Released: February 5, 2002; 3. "Pretty Girl (The Way)" Released: July 29, 2002

Start Static is the debut studio album by American rock band Sugarcult, released on August 21, 2001 by Ultimatum Music. Produced by Matt Wallace, it was their first album to receive mainstream success. The album's success was driven by hits like "Stuck in America", "Bouncing Off the Walls", and "Pretty Girl (The Way)". Start Static received generally positive reviews from music critics and while the album did not reach the US Billboard 200, it achieved significant success on independent and genre-specific charts, particularly in the United Kingdom. This is the band's only album to feature original drummer Ben Davis; he left the group in late 2003 to seek treatment for alcoholism and was replaced by Kenny Livingston.

== Background ==
Vocalist/guitarist Tim Pagnotta founded Sugarcult in Santa Barbara, California, in 1998 with drummer Ben Davis. Bassist Airin Older joined, followed by guitarist Marko DeSantis. They released two albums, Eleven (1998) and Wrap Me Up in Plastic (2000), and two EPs, Get Street Cred (1999) and Songs About Girls (2000). The band spent October 2000 to February 2001 working on new material, including tracks such as "Stuck in America", "Crashing Down" and "Lost in You". In total, they had 24 songs to choose from for inclusion on their next album.

The group sent demos to record labels, eventually signing to independent label Ultimatum Music in January 2001. Recording for their next album took place at Rumbo Recorders in Los Angeles, California with producer Matt Wallace in March and April 2001. He was helped by engineer Mike Landolt and assistant Posie Muliadi. Davis did additional production and engineering, as well as produce and engineer "I Changed My Name" and the hidden track. Wallace mixed the recordings with assistant Brett Nolan at Can Am Studios in May, before they were mastered by Alan Yoshida at Oceanway/JVC Mastering.

== Composition ==
Musically, Start Static has been described as pop punk, pop rock and power pop, with influences from punk rock, drawing a comparison to American Hi-Fi. DeSantis gave the album its title, which Pagnotta said was a slang term for beginning a fight. DeSantis also liked that the Static part could be interpretated as the "sound your radio makes when you can’t tune in a station". The songs tackle the themes of disbelief, escapism and recklessness. With the lyrics, Pagnotta didn't feel comfortable being completely vulnerable and that he was unsure how to process his thoughts. "You're the One" opens with an Elvis Costello-esque riff; Pagnotta said he intentionally reused the riff from Costello's "Radio Radio" (1978). "Stuck in America" is about being young and wanting to leave your town. "Saying Goodbye" is about wanting a change of scenery; The Boston Phoenix writer Sean Richardson said it stars a "no-luck teenage runaway who sleeps with the boys for free". "Lost in You" is a nostalgic view of a past relationship, and was compared to the Goo Goo Dolls. Richardson wrote that the girl from "Saying Goodbye" returns in ""Pretty Girl (The Way)", adding that by this point, she was "not as much fun to sympathize with". Discussing the album's hidden track "Underwear", DeSantis said they used it to show of their wider musical palette instead of being restricted to pop-punk.

== Release ==
On June 18, 2001, the band's next album was announced for release in August; its track listing was also revealed. On July 18, the group revealed the album's title: Start Static. Preceded by the radio single "Stuck in America" on August 6, Start Static was released on August 21. During the month, a music video was filmed for "Stuck in America", directed by Shawn Foster. The band re-recorded "Bouncing Off the Walls" with producer Mark Trombino, which was released as a radio single on February 5, 2002; the CD single featured "How Does It Feel" and "Killing Me". The group filmed a music video for "Bouncing Off the Walls" in Hollywood.

Around this time, they gained exposure when four songs from Start Static appeared in the film Van Wilder (2002), the soundtrack to which featured "Bouncing Off the Walls" and was also released through Ultimatum. The "Bouncing Off the Walls" video, directed by Steven Oritt, premiered on MTV's Total Request Live on April 4, and featured Tara Reid and Ryan Reynolds, both of whom had starred in Van Wilder. "Pretty Girl (The Way)" was released as a radio single on July 29; the CD single featured "Over Now", "Say I'm Sorry" and the music video for "Pretty Girl (The Way)". The video was released online on August 6; it was filmed in Trinidad by director Orbitt.

Davis went to rehab and was temporarily replaced by Lefty drummer Kenny Livingston in September; Davis officially left the group by Thanksgiving. In January 2003, the band signed to Epitaph Records to release Start Static in Europe. While in London, a second video for "Bouncing Off the Walls" was made, directed by Orbitt, and featured live footage and the band around the city. "Stuck in America" was released as a single in the UK on March 10; the CD single featured "You're the One", "No Action" and the music video for "Stuck in America". On March 17, Epitaph made the album available for streaming, before releasing it in Europe on March 24. In 2011, the band played 10th anniversary show for Start Static, which included Davis performing with them.

== Touring ==
Following the album's mixing sessions, the band played a handful of regional shows in May and June 2001. The group had initially planned to only play the first eleven shows of the Warped Tour, until they were added to the remaining dates from late June to early August, save for a one-week support slot for Blink-182 in late July. They embarked on a month-long US tour, running into mid-September when they began played radio station festivals until early October. In October and November, the group toured the US with Reel Big Fish, Goldfinger and Lefty, before embarking on a two-week tour with Good Charlotte and Mest in November and December. The band closed the year with a handful of headlining shows. In January 2002, the band toured with Home Grown on their US tour.

Following this, the group went on a five-week national US tour supporting Unwritten Law in February and March, before spending the remainder of March playing headlining shows. The band played an assortment of shows with Fairview and Lefty in April, before embarking on a six-week US tour. Older dropped off the tour, citing personal reasons, with Billy Lee from the 65 Film Show and Tim Cullen from Summercamp filling in his position. The band took a short break, before playing a two-week stint on the Warped Tour in July. After Warped, the group went on a US tour with Less Than Jake in August, and appeared at Punk-A-Phenomenon. Between October and December, the band supported the Ataris on their headlining US tour. On November 28, the band appeared on The Late Late Show, which was followed by a performance on Last Call with Carson Daly. Sugarcult supported Reel Big Fish on their headlining UK tour in January and February 2003.

== Reception ==
Professional ratings
Review scores
Source	Rating
AllMusic	3/5 stars
The Boston Phoenix	2.5/5 stars
Drowned in Sound	4/5
Melodic	3/5 stars
Rock Hard	9/10
Sacramento News & Review	4/5
Sorted	Unfavorable

Start Static was met with generally favorable reviews from music critics. AllMusic reviewer Tom Semioli felt that the band had "mastered the don't-bore-us-get-to-the-chorus approach to near perfection". Dan Aquilante of New York Post wrote that almost "every song has the potential to be a single", and aside from the "few retro passages" that "twist your brain - in that what-song-is-that-like way", he saw it as an original effort from the band. Rock Hard writer Marcus Schleutermann said that the tracks have a "catchiness of various bravo punk bands, but in contrast, are provided with charismatic rough edges". Sacramento News & Review's David Jayne cautioned listeners: "When 'You’re the One,' 'Stuck in America,' 'Saying Goodbye' and the very catchy 'Bouncing off the Walls'—with melodies you’ll have a hard time escaping—get stuck in your head, beware".

CMJ New Music Report writer Amy Sciarretto said "Bouncing Off the Walls" was an outlier, as the rest of the album does not "pogo up and down like they've been sucking down cases of Mountain Dew for three days straight". She said despite comparisons to Cheap Trick and the Knack, the album "never sounds retro". Ink 19 reviewer Marcel Feldmar said it was "not bad, it’s Get Up Kids fun, all bright and poppy," telling listeners to ignore some of the song titles, "because the tight melodics and fast forward dynamics keep my head moving and my face smiling". Melodic webmaster Johan Wippsson complimented Wallace's production, and said that the "standard of the songs [is] good enough to makes this record interesting". Richardson said he band's "hefty arena punk [sound] is more than serviceable throughout, hitting its fist-pumping high point on the flippant 'How Does It Feel.' As finger-licking pop metal goes, not quite Sugar and not quite the Cult — but not half bad, either".

The staff at Impact Press told the listener not to be "surprised to see a video from these guys someday as they are continuing the formula that has been used time and time again by other Green Day wannabes". Drowned in Sound's Peter White, meanwhile, called the album a "festering wreck of a record, it oozes stolen genius. It doesn’t bolster your senses with never ending mesmerising noise, rather sliding Tom Petty punk glimmers through your radio friendly sockets". PopMatters contributor Andrew Ellis wrote that instead of "being a mere clone of what’s come before, what makes their music sustainable in such a crowded scene is the solid songwriting" of Pagnotta. He added that the guitar riffs were "crunchy and economic" as Pagnotta "has an interesting knack for filling his three-minute pop-punk tunes with more than your average teen-angst lyrics". He felt that "what the music (and the name) perhaps lacks in originality, it more than compensates for in well-written, high-energy tunes that remain memorable long past the customary first few plays".

By December 2003, Start Static had sold 300,000 copies. Cleveland.com ranked "Bouncing Off the Walls" at number 76 on their list of the top 100 pop-punk songs.

== Track listing ==
Track listing per booklet.

1. "You're the One" – 1:50
2. "Stuck in America" – 2:55
3. "Hate Every Beautiful Day" – 3:26
4. "Bouncing Off the Walls" – 2:19
5. "Saying Goodbye" – 3:22
6. "Daddy's Little Defect" – 3:12
7. "Lost in You" – 3:32
8. "Pretty Girl (The Way)" – 3:28
9. "Crashing Down" – 3:38
10. "How Does It Feel" – 3:14
11. "I Changed My Name" – 3:41
12. "Underwear" (hidden track) – 2:24

== Personnel ==
Personnel per booklet.

Sugarcult

- Tim Pagnotta – lead vocals, rhythm guitar
- Marko DeSantis – lead guitar
- Airin Older – bass, backup vocals
- Ben Davis – drums, backup vocals

Production

- Matt Wallace – producer, mixing
- Mike Landolt – engineer
- Posie Muliadi – assistant engineer
- Brett Nolan – mixing assistant
- Ben Davis – additional production, additional engineer; producer, engineer (tracks 11 and 12)
- Alan Yoshida – mastering
- Becky Neiman – photography, design
- Amber Cluck – photography
- Sugarcult – photography

== Charts ==
Chart performance
Chart (2002–2003)	Peak position
Japanese Albums (Oricon)	20
UK Independent Albums (OCC)	36
UK Rock & Metal Albums (OCC)	40
US Billboard 200	194
US Heatseekers Albums (Billboard)	4
US Independent Albums (Billboard)	6
