= Stuck in America =

2001 single by Sugarcult

Single by Sugarcult

from the album Start Static
- Released: August 6, 2001
- Recorded: 2001
- Genre: Pop-punk
- Length: 2:57
- Label: Ultimatum; Artemis; Epitaph
- Songwriter: Tim Pagnotta
- Producer: Matt Wallace

Sugarcult singles chronology
| "Stuck in America" (2001) | "Bouncing Off the Walls" (2002) |

Music video
- "Stuck in America" on YouTube

Music video
- "Stuck in America" alternate music video on Vimeo

"Stuck in America" is a song by the American rock band Sugarcult from their 2001 album Start Static. The song was released as their debut single on August 6, 2001 by Ultimatum Music and Artemis Records, as well as Epitaph Records in Europe.

== Background ==
The song's narrative about being young and wanting to skip town.

== Music video ==
The music video, directed by Shawn Foster, featured the band performing at a Japanese talk show with being cheers by crowds primarily of Japanese girls.

== Lyrical changes ==
Sugarcult's debut album, Start Static came out on August 21, 2001, shortly before the September 11 attacks. The line "blowin' up the neighborhood" and "everybody's gonna watch it burn today" were deemed by the Federal Communications Commission (FCC) to be too reminiscent of the attacks. Sugarcult changed the lyric "Everybody's talking about blowin' up the neighborhood" to "everybody's talking about wakin' up the neighborhood".

== See also ==
- Impact of the September 11 attacks on the entertainment industry
