= Michael Waltman =

American actor

Michael Gordon Waltman (November 6, 1946 – April 27, 2011) was an American film and television actor. His credits included Tower of Terror, Beyond the Law and National Lampoon's Van Wilder.

Waltman was born in Detroit, Michigan, on November 6, 1946, to Gordon and Dorothy Waltman. He moved with his family to Phoenix, Arizona, where he resided for forty-one years. Waltman served in the Vietnam War from 1967 to 1969 on a guided missile cruiser. He was a recipient of the Purple Heart and achieved the rank of petty officer second class.

Waltman relocated to Los Angeles in 1994 to pursue an acting career. He was cast in numerous television, film and theater roles. His film credits included National Lampoon's Van Wilder, Beyond the Law and Arizona Heat. His numerous television roles included ER, NYPD Blue and The Practice.

Waltman died at his home in Pacific Palisades, California, on April 27, 2011, at the age of 64. He was buried at Riverside National Cemetery in Riverside, California.
