= Bouncing Off the Walls =

Single by Sugarcult

from the album Start Static
- B-side: "How Does It Feel"; "Killing Me"; "Over Now"
- Released: February 5, 2002
- Recorded: 2001
- Genre: Pop-punk; emo
- Length: 2:21
- Label: Ultimatum; Artemis; Epitaph
- Songwriters: Ben Davis; Marko DeSantis; Airin Older; Tim Pagnotta
- Producers: Matt Wallace (album version); Mark Trombino (single version)

Sugarcult singles chronology
"Stuck in America" (2001)	"Bouncing Off the Walls" (2002)	"Pretty Girl (The Way)" (2002)

Music video
- "Bouncing Off the Walls" on YouTube

"Bouncing Off the Walls" is the second single by the American rock band Sugarcult from their 2001 album Start Static. A demo version titled simply "Bouncing" originally appeared on their 2000 collection, Wrap Me Up in Plastic. The song was the lead single of the soundtrack to the film Van Wilder, which was released by the band's label Ultimatum Music. It also appeared in "12:00 a.m. – 1:00 a.m.", the first episode of the TV series 24 and the film American Wedding and the video game Big Air Freestyle. The song reached #16 on the Official UK Rock & Metal Singles Chart in 2003.

In 2022, Cleveland.com ranked "Bouncing Off the Walls" at number 76 on their list of the top 100 pop-punk songs.

== Track listing ==
CD single
No.	Title	Length
1.	"Bouncing Off The Walls" (Mark Trombino Mix)	2:21
2.	"Bouncing Off The Walls" (Mark Trombino Mix - Drug Free)	2:11
3.	"Bouncing Off The Walls" (Album Version)	2:17
4.	"Bouncing Off The Walls" (Album Version - Squeaky Clean)	2:19
5.	"Bouncing Off The Walls" (Radio Hook)	0:10

== Music video ==
There are two versions of the music video.

The first "Bouncing Off the Walls" music video, directed by Steven Oritt, premiered on MTV's Total Request Live on April 4, 2002 and features the band members performing and scenes from the film Van Wilder with Ryan Reynolds and Tara Reid.

The second video for "Bouncing Off the Walls" was made, also directed by Orbitt, and featured live footage and the band around London.

== In popular culture ==
"Bouncing Off the Walls" has appeared in various media. It was played in the background of the series premiere of the television show 24, "12:00 a.m. – 1:00 a.m." and January 8, 2006 episode of America's Funniest Home Videos. Additionally, the song was featured on the soundtracks of the films Van Wilder and American Wedding. It was also featured in the Warren Miller documentary Off the Grid. The song was also featured in the 2002 game Big Air Freestyle.
