= Zane's Sex Chronicles =

- Created by: Zane
- Written by: Zane
- Directed by: Shawn Foster; Cameron Casey (second unit)
- Starring: Patrice Fisher; Maya Gilbert; Johanna Qunitero; Laila Odom; Christina DeRosa (Season 1); Megan McCord Kim (Season 2); Liana Mendoza (Season 2); Steve West (Season 2)
- Country of origin: United States
- Original language: English
- No. of seasons: 2
- No. of episodes: 26

Production
- Producers: Zane; Suzanne De Passe; Rose Carae; Madison Jones; Christopher Gosch
- Cinematography: Christopher Gosch
- Editor: Thom Obarski
- Camera setup: Single camera
- Production companies: The Company Pictures; HBO Entertainment

Original release
- Network: Cinemax
- Release: October 11, 2008 – May 28, 2010

Zane's Sex Chronicles is an American television series based on the urban erotica novels written by Zane. The series follows the friendships and relationship of five female friends who enjoy the steamy stories of erotic writer Zane. The series aired on Cinemax from October 11, 2008 to May 28, 2010.

== Premise ==
The series follows heroine Patience James and her girlfriends, Eboni, Maricruz, Lyric, and Ana Marie as they take on their lives in the big city, look for love and empower themselves—both in and out of the bedroom.

Season	Episodes	Originally released	
Season	Episodes	First released	Last released
1	13	October 10, 2008	December 26, 2008
2	13	February 13, 2010	May 28, 2010

== Cast and characters ==
=== Main characters ===
- Patrice Fisher as Patience James, a V.P. of Marketing for Flava Cosmetics. She also lives an anonymous double life as writer Zane, a secret she keeps from her friends. Confident and strong-willed, Patience begins a relationship with Hunter.
- Maya Gilbert as Dr. Lyric Stansfield-Cruz, an obstetrician. Lyric is happily married to Dr. Estaban Cruz but sexually frustrated within their relationship.
- Johanna Quintero as Maricruz Aguilar, a designer for Flava Cosmetics and colleague of Patience James. Maricruz is married and a mother of two children. She divorces her husband in season two but can not seem to break away from him.
- Laila Odom as Ana Marie Hawkings, a stand-up comedian and Patience James's best friend since high school. Ana Marie is involved in an on-again-off-again relationship with her boyfriend, Taariq.
- Christina DeRosa as Hannah "Eboni" Bendenhall (Season 1), the free-spirited owner of spa Steam.
- Amin Joseph as Taariq, the hip-hop artist boyfriend of Ana Marie.
- Megan McCord Kim as Jade (Season 2), a childhood friend of Patience's, Lyric's and Ana Marie's.
- Liana Mendoza as Trinity (Season 2), the newest vixen in town whom is having a sexual relationship with Kerrigan and co-owns the hottest new club, The After Life.

=== Recurring characters ===
- Gichi Gamba as Stephen Kerrigan
- Ezra "Buddha" Masters as Hunter
- Steve West as Grayson (Season 2).

== Episodes ==
=== Season 1 (2008) ===
No. overall	No. in season	Title	Directed by	Written by	Original release date	Prod. code
1 2	1 2	"Dirty Laundry"	Shawn Foster and Terri Hanauer	Zane	October 10, 2008	101 102
3	3	"The Barbershop"	Unknown	Unknown	October 17, 2008	103
4	4	"Nymph"	Shawn Foster	Zane	October 24, 2008	104
5	5	"A Flash Fantasy"	Unknown	Unknown	October 31, 2008	105
6	6	"Lust in a Bus Depot"	Unknown	Unknown	November 7, 2008	106
7	7	"Wrong Number"	Unknown	Unknown	November 14, 2008	107
8	8	"Room 69"	Unknown	Unknown	November 21, 2008	108
9	9	"The Big Screaming O"	Unknown	Unknown	November 28, 2008	109
10	10	"The Pussy Bandit"	Unknown	Unknown	December 5, 2008	110
11	11	"Body Chemistry 101"	Unknown	Unknown	December 12, 2008	111
12	12	"The Voyeur"	Unknown	Unknown	December 19, 2008	112
13	13	"The Seduction"	Unknown	Unknown	December 26, 2008	113

=== Season 2 (2010) ===
No. overall	No. in season	Title	Directed by	Written by	Original release date	Prod. code
14	1	"Curveballs"	Unknown	Unknown	February 13, 2010	201
15	2	"Reactions"	Jean Moody	Zane	March 12, 2010	202
16	3	"I Had a Bad Day"	Jean Moody	Zane	March 19, 2010	203
17	4	"An Even Swap Ain't No Swindle"	Shawn Foster and Jean Moody	Zane	March 26, 2010	204
18	5	"Physical Therapy"	Shawn Foster and Jean Moody	Zane	April 2, 2010	205
19	6	"Blind Date"	Shawn Foster and Jean Moody	Zane	April 9, 2010	206
20	7	"On the Prowl"	Shawn Foster and Jean Moody	Zane	April 16, 2010	207
21	8	"The Stakeout"	Shawn Foster	Zane	April 23, 2010	208
22	9	"Dinner at Eight"	Jean Moody	Zane	April 30, 2010	209
23	10	"Trading Spaces"	Jean Moody	Zane	May 7, 2010	210
24	11	"The Workout"	Shawn Foster	Zane	May 14, 2010	211
25	12	"Brazen"	Shawn Foster and Jean Moody	Zane	May 21, 2010	212
26	13	"End Game"	Shawn Foster and Jean Moody	Zane	May 28, 2010	213

== Cancellation ==
Zane posted an update on September 13, 2010 on Facebook about the future of the show:

"Many of you have asked about the return of Zane's Sex Chronicles on Cinemax for a third season and I realize that a lot of you ordered the channel just for me. Again, I appreciate you. I wanted to let you know that there will not be a third season. Also, the second season is not scheduled to be released on DVD at this time. But, you can still purchase the first season on Amazon.com or rent it from Blockbuster or NetFlix. For those of you who got really caught up in the characters, there is a tie-in book for the series that digs deeper into their backgrounds and relationships. It is entitled Zane's Sex Chronicles, exactly like the show."
