= Shawn Foster =

American director

Shawn M. Foster is an American music video, film, and television director.

== Biography ==
=== Career ===
Shawn Foster is a 2018 Grammy award winner as the Producer of the Lisa Loeb children's video record release of Feel What U Feel.

Early in his career, his short film, White Pony, was a major contribution to the worldwide success of the Deftones record of the same name. Since then, he directed videos and projects for a wide range of artists and genres including the Gram Parsons Tribute Documentary, featuring Elvis Costello, Steve Earle, Norah Jones, Keith Richards, John Doe and Dwight Yoakam, among others. Also directing Live at the 40 Watt for the Drive-By Truckers, featuring Jason Isbell.

He has also directed videos for The Warlocks, Gaunt, Drive-By Truckers, Chevelle, Napalmbats, Stabbing Westward, Tim Easton, Sugarcult, The Sun, Enemy, Taproot, Johnathan Rice, Caleb Kane He also helmed the directing teams ELEANOR, (with Michael Barnett) and CITIZENS OF TOMORROW (with Craig Bernard). Foster has worked on many projects with long-time friend and music video producer Michael J. Pierce, including Union Underground, Stabbing Westward, Napalmbats, Drive-By Truckers, Caleb Kane, The Sun, and Tim Easton. Foster, Pierce, and Barnett formed Aisle 5 Studios in Venice, California in 2004 and closed the company shortly after Barnett's death in January 2007.

Formerly. one of the founding partners at Boulevard Industries, he moved from Boulevard to direct for television and film, completing the HBO episodic series, Zane's Sex Chronicles. Z.S.C., is written by New York Times best-selling author Zane and produced by Oscar nominee, two-time Emmy winner Suzanne de Passe.

He was a multi-nominated MVPA director at Palomar Pictures and A Few Miles North. Preceding Palomar, he ran Naked, with director, Marc Webb. (500) Days of Summer / The Amazing Spider-Man). He is currently in pre-production for the short film, Nancy Boy, a script he wrote and adapted from a short story by Adam Rose, with music composed by Troy Van Leeuwen (Queens of the Stone Age).

Shawn spent much of 2016 working with The Mavericks where he recently directed long-form projects for their East Coast and the Texas tour. The Mavericks, are a multi Billboard charting band, Grammy winners and have recently launched their private label, Mono Mundo/Thirty Tigers.

Shawn ended 2016 by directing and shooting projects for Leanne Womack and Friends (Red Light Management) and Todd Snider (with Aaron Lee Tasjan) for (Aimless/Gold Mountain Management).

Raised in Columbus, Ohio, he is a graduate of Ohio University in Athens, Ohio. Following graduation, he resided in Los Angeles for sixteen years. Then moving to Nashville, Tennessee in 2012, where he has a daughter and three dogs in a very large yard.
