= Memory (Sugarcult song) =

Single by Sugarcult

from the album Palm Trees and Power Lines
- Released: March 16, 2004
- Recorded: Full Kilt Studio & Third Stone Recordings
- Genre: Pop-punk
- Length: 3:47
- Label: Fearless; Artemis
- Songwriters: Marko DeSantis; Ken Livingston; Airin Older; Tim Pagnotta
- Producer: Gavin MacKillop

Sugarcult singles chronology
"Pretty Girl (The Way)" (2002)	"Memory" (2004)	"She's the Blade" (2004)

Music videos
- "Memory" on YouTube
- "Memory" (alternate music video) on YouTube
- "Memory" (animated music video) on YouTube

"Memory" is a single by the band Sugarcult released in 2004. "Memory" was released to radio on March 16, 2004. The song is featured on their second studio album, Palm Trees and Power Lines. An acoustic version of the song was released on Punk Goes Acoustic.

Guitarist Marko DeSantis described the song as originating from a love triangle between lead singer Tim Pagnotta, bassist Airin Older, and a photographer which caused Pagnotta to become "cynical about love working out." It is seen as the band's signature single.

== Music video ==
There are three versions of the music video. One is an animated version while one is non-animated.

The non-animated version, shows a man falling out of love at the start, and he decides to go back in time to put things right, using a time machine. He goes back to one week before. He then drives a car up to the girl's house but sees his past self quarreling with the girl. A man then uses the time machine to go back to two weeks before. He sees his past self kissing the girl on the beach. He is then discovered by them and gets into a fight with his past self. The girl gets upset and leaves. They then go back in time to three weeks before and kidnaps his past self and Pagnotta locks both his past selves inside the garage. He then gets back together with the girl. It is noticed that the chorus is always played while a man is going back in time in the non-animated version of the video.

The animated version begins with a stick version of Pagnotta singing the first verse on a page in a book as a plane with a banner labeled "SUGARCULT" passes behind him. Then the entire band, in stick form, plays the chorus and frequently does so in the video. During the second verse there are images of many stick figures dancing next to the lyrics of the song as well as images of people with Pagnotta and his girlfriend's head. After DeSantis performs the guitar solo Pagnotta is seen begging a girl for her love back on his knees, as he pulls his heart out (mirroring the lyric "tearing out my heart") to show her how sad he is. During the last chorus the stick version of the band is playing in a mash-up of all the different scenes. The video ends with the animated Pagnotta closing the book (which is labeled "Memories") and shedding a single tear before walking away.

== Cover version ==
Japanese singer hitomi sang a Japanese cover of "Memory" on her 2009 album Love Life 2. hitomi wrote her own lyrics in Japanese for the song.

== In popular culture ==
The song was featured on the video game soundtracks to Burnout 3: Takedown and NHL 2005. DeSantis recalled in 2021 that he had little familiarity with ice hockey, being the sport "we know the least about", but approved of the song's inclusion in the latter for bringing the band to a new audience. It was also added as DLC for Rock Band.
