= Propeller Arena =

- Developer: Sega AM2
- Publisher: Sega
- Director: Makoto Osaki
- Producer: Yu Suzuki
- Designer: Junichi Yamanaka
- Programmer: Tetsuya Sugimoto
- Artist: Shoji Takeuchi
- Composers: Sachio Ogawa; Tomoya Koga
- Platform: Dreamcast
- Release: Cancelled
- Genre: Action
- Modes: Single-player, multiplayer

Propeller Arena: Aviation Battle Championship was a video game for the Dreamcast console. It was originally titled Propeller Head Online, and was to be released on September 19, 2001. The game was trademarked on August 14, 2001. It was developed and completed by the development team Sega AM2, but the game was never officially released. The release was cancelled just days after the September 11 attacks, citing both similarities in game packaging and design to the events of that day as well as the Dreamcast's declining market share resulting in projected low sales numbers.

The game was on display at E3 on May 19, 2001. After it was postponed, they were working to change the game cover art to remove sensitive images.

Hopes of a port to another console never materialized. However, a disk image of the game was eventually leaked, and became a popular download on many peer-to-peer networks.

== Plot ==
In 2045, there is an air combat tournament with planes from the World War II era. Several pilots join the tournament, each with their own reasons.

== Gameplay ==
Tower City, the stage that killed Propeller Arena's release

Propeller Arena consists of quick dog fight deathmatches in limited areas.

The game has four modes: the main game, Championship, which is a sequence of dogfights; Quick Battle, a single dogfight; Training Arena, a number of training missions and minigames; and Network, the online mode. Beating the game and the training missions unlocks extra characters and levels.

The game features force feedback via support for the Dreamcast Jump Pack.

Network mode was unavailable until recently due to the game having never been officially released, but in March 2026 Propeller Arena was brought online, nearly 25 years after its cancellation, thanks to FlyCast and DCNet. Network mode allows users to create "rooms" of 2-6 players for multiplayer dog fights. There is also a Broadband Adapter Settings menu. If a Dreamcast player is using the Broadband Adapter, enter the BBA settings menu and change the DNS to: 46.101.91.123 to connect to the DCNet servers. Players using the DreamPi method to connect do not need to change any settings. Flycast users must select connect to DCnet in the options. Microphone and Leaderboard functionality have not been restored, but should be available soon.

== Soundtrack ==
The game's soundtrack, consisting of punk rock, was created by both "branches" of Sega: a Japanese team (Sachio Ogawa and Tomoya Koga) had 13 songs composed and produced in-house, while an American team arranged a deal with the Fat Wreck Chords label to license nine songs from the bands Consumed, Zero Down, No Use for a Name, Mad Caddies, and Rise Against. Some of Sega's original songs were remixed as instrumental versions and reused in their 2006 sports game Virtua Tennis 3.

== See also ==
- List of entertainment affected by the September 11 attacks
- The Sky Crawlers: Innocent Aces, an air combat game with a somewhat similar setting
