= Lights Out (Sugarcult album) =

Studio album by Sugarcult
- Released: September 12, 2006
- Genres: Hard rock; alternative rock; pop-punk; pop rock
- Length: 38:56
- Labels: Fearless; V2
- Producer: Gavin MacKillop

Sugarcult chronology
Palm Trees and Power Lines (2004)	Lights Out (2006)

Singles from Lights Out
- 1. "Do It Alone" Released: July 18, 2006

Professional ratings
Review scores
Source	Rating
Allmusic	3.5/5 stars
Melodic	3.5/5 stars

Lights Out is the third and final studio album by American rock band Sugarcult, released on September 12, 2006 by Fearless Records and V2 Records. Produced by Gavin MacKillop, the album peaked at number 64 on the US Billboard 200 and marks the band's last studio work before their "de facto" hiatus. it is the last album to featured Kenny Livingston as the drummer before the original drummer Ben Davis would rejoined the band in 2011. The record is widely categorized as alternative rock and pop-punk, with reviewers noting a shift toward a more "modern rock" or "pop-rock" sound compared to their earlier punk-heavy material.

== Recording and production ==
The band’s record label Artemis Records had been absorbed by V2 Records prior to the release. Guitarist Marko DeSantis described the era as the band’s "grand arrival" after years of building a fanbase, though the label's power felt less stable than they initially hoped. DeSantis viewed the album as a "two-part dissertation": one half focused on self-medication through one-night stands and the other on frustration with the music industry.

Gavin MacKillop served as producer and recording engineer, Tom Lord-Alge handled the mixing at South Beach Studios, bringing his signature high-energy "glossed production" to the tracks and Steve Marcussen mastered the album at Marcussen Mastering. The sessions took place across three primary studios in Los Angeles: Full Kilt Studios, Sage & Sound and Music Friends Studios. The album made extensive use of Pro Tools engineering, with a team including Kyle Homme, Mauro Rubbi, Tim Pagnotta, and Vince Jones. Additional instrumental layers like the E-Bow and keyboards were provided by session musicians Martyn LeNoble and Victor Indrizzo. The band moved away from the "carefree, punky anthems" of their debut toward a more "serious, hard-rock stance". Frontman Pagnotta adopted a "rougher" and "scruffier" vocal delivery compared to earlier releases, which critics noted added to the album's mature, albeit darker, atmosphere.

== Release ==
On June 12, Lights Out was announced for release. "Do It Alone" was released to radio on July 18; the song's music video was posted online on August 4, 2006. On August 24, 2006, Lights Out was made available for streaming, before being released on September 12 through Fearless/V2. The next day, an alternative video for "Do It Alone" was posted online. In September and October, the band went on a headlining tour, with support from the Spill Canvas, Halifax, Maxeen, and So They Say. Following this, they appeared at the Bamboozle Left festival, and toured the US throughout November 2006 with the Pink Spiders. In April and May 2007, the band supported Talib Kweli on the Virgin College Mega Tour in the US. In August 2007, the band headlined the Bay Area Indie Music Festival.

== Reception ==
Critics generally describe the album as a solid but "safe" pop-punk record. A critic from Sputnikmusic praised the album for being "catchy as hell," particularly highlighting the opening intro and the track "Dead Living".

== Track listing ==
All tracks are written by Tim Pagnotta, except where noted.

Standard Edition
No.	Title	Length
1.	"Lights Out"	0:38
2.	"Dead Living"	3:39
3.	"Los Angeles"	3:58
4.	"Do It Alone" (Pagnotta, Nick Herrick, Brent Mulligan, Sean Mulligan)	3:07
5.	"Explode"	1:53
6.	"Out of Phase"	3:26
7.	"Made a Mistake" (Pagnotta, Gavin MacKillop, Brooke Heller)	4:14
8.	"Riot"	3:28
9.	"Majoring in Minors" (Pagnotta, MacKillop)	2:55
10.	"Shaking"	3:52
11.	"The Investigation"	3:50
12.	"Hiatus"	4:02
Total length:		38:56

Japanese Bonus Tracks
No.	Title	Length
13.	"Freezing"	1:51
14.	"A Hard Day's Night" (John Lennon and Paul McCartney)	2:25
Total length:		43:11

== Personnel ==
- Tim Pagnotta – lead vocals, rhythm guitar
- Airin Older – bass guitar, backing vocals
- Marko DeSantis – lead guitar
- Kenny Livingston – drums
- Gavin MacKillop - production
- Tom Lord-Alge - mixing
- Stephen Marcussen - mastering

== Charts ==
Chart performance
Chart (2006)	Peak position
Japanese Albums (Oricon)	12
US Billboard 200	64
