= Palm Trees and Power Lines =

Studio album by Sugarcult
- Released: April 13, 2004
- Recorded: March–June, September 2003
- Studios: Full Kilt, Hollywood, California; Third Stone Recordings, Hollywood, California
- Genres: Pop-punk; power pop
- Length: 40:43
- Labels: Fearless; Artemis
- Producer: Gavin MacKillop

Sugarcult chronology
Start Static (2001)	Palm Trees and Power Lines (2004)	Lights Out (2006)

Singles from Palm Trees and Power Lines
- 1. "Memory" Released: March 16, 2004; 2. "She's the Blade" Released: August 31, 2004

Palm Trees and Power Lines is the second studio album by American rock band Sugarcult, released on April 13, 2004, through Fearless and Artemis Records. A year after the release of their third studio album Start Static (2001), Kenny Livingston became their new drummer. Shortly afterwards, they started writing new material for the follow-up album. Recording started in March 2003 and ended in September 2003, in between various tours. Sessions were held at Full Kilt Studio and Third Stone Recording, both in North Hollywood, California, with producer Gavin MacKillop. Palm Trees and Power Lines is a pop-punk and power pop album that recalled the work of Blink-182.

Palm Trees and Power Lines received mixed reviews from music critics, some praising the quality of songwriting, while others felt that the music was uninspiring and lacked originality. It peaked number 46 on the Billboard 200. Following the album's recording, the band went on a headlining tour of the United States and supported Good Charlotte in Japan and the United Kingdom. Following another support slot, this time for MxPx and Simple Plan, "Memory" was released as the album's lead single in March 2004. The band then went on headlining stints of the US and Japan, leading into an appearance on the Warped Tour. "She's the Blade" was released as the second single form the album in August 2004.

== Background and production ==
Sugarcult released their third studio album Start Static in August 2001, which had two successful singles "Stuck in America" and "Bouncing Off the Walls", through Ultimatum Music in the United States and Epitaph Records in Europe. Drummer Ben Davis went to rehab and was replaced by Lefty drummer Kenny Livingston in September 2002; Davis officially left the group by Thanksgiving. With Livingston's arrival, the group was impressed by his skill level and inspired the members to improve their own skills on their respective instruments. The band then rented a rehearsal room and spend each day working on new material, writing all of the songs that would later feature on their next album in less than two months. The band supported Start Static with two years of tours, running into February 2003. By this point, frontman Tim Pagnotta had accumulated 16 new songs, with which he was hoping to expand on the "moodier" tracks from Start Static.

Pre-production was done at Studio 9 in Los Angeles, lasting for three weeks. Recording took place between March and June 2003 at Full Kilt Studio and Third Stone Recording in North Hollywood, California with Gavin MacKillop producing the proceedings. From May to September, the group went on a number of tours across Japan and Europe, with mixing and further recording sessions sprinkled in between. John Nooney, Mauro Rubbi and Trent Slatton, the latter of whom also did programming, served as the Pro-Tools engineers during the sessions. Wesley Seidman acted as assistant engineer at Third Stone Recording. Additional production was then done by Pagnotta.

Several friends contributed instrumentation or vocals: Tim Cullen of Summercamp (additional backing vocals), Alain Johannes (additional guitar), Nooney and Ariel Rechtshaid of the Hippos (keyboards). Mixing was split across a few people at different studios: Tom Lord-Alge at South Beach Studio ("She's the Blade", "Crying", "Memory", "Back to California" and "Over"), Mark Trombino at Chalice Recording Studios ("Worst December" and "Champagne") with assistance from Alan Mason, Mackillop ("Destination Anywhere", "What You Say", "Head Up" and "Counting Stars"), and Evan Frankfort ("Sign Off"). Brian Gardner mastered the recordings at Bernie Grudman Mastering in Hollywood, California.

== Composition ==
Musically, the sound Palm Trees and Power Lines has been described as pop punk and power pop, drawing comparisons to Blink-182. The title for the album was the result of DeSantis standing in the studio's back alley, look up at the skyline, where all he could see was palm trees and electrical lines, a view that Pagnotta saw as a combination of "beauty and harsh reality co-existing." It is named after the scenery in California where the band members live. Retaining the format of Start Static, Palm Trees and Power Lines consists of several uptempo rock songs with ballads placed throughout.

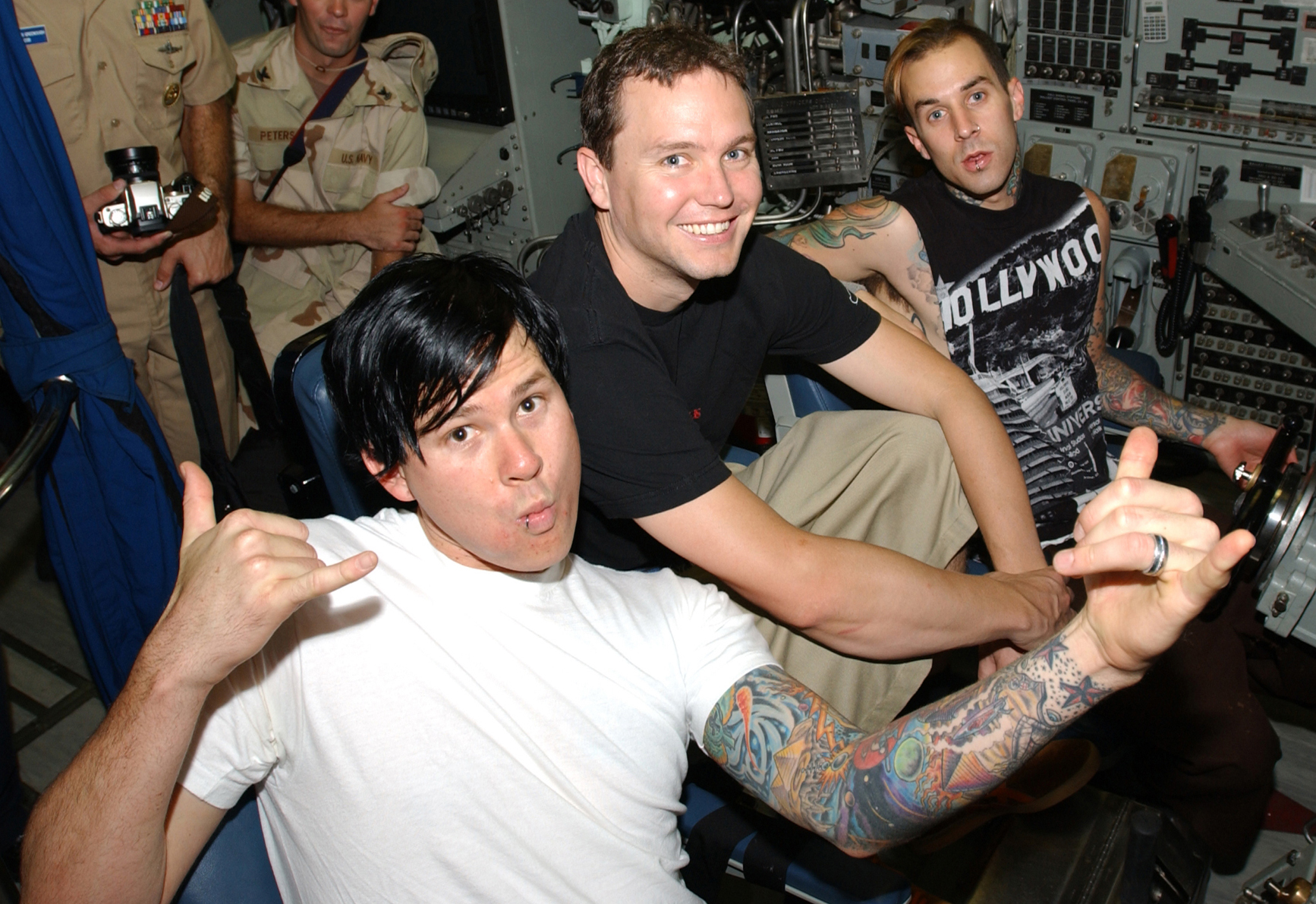
Palm Trees and Power Lines recalled the work of Blink-182.

All of the lyrics were written by Pagnotta, while all of the music was credited to Pagnotta and the band. He would show a rough sketch of a song to the rest of the group, at which point they'd flesh it out. The tracks talk about the preceding two and half years of Pagnotta's life as a touring musician, touching on the theme of being a traveller, determination to return home provoked by a relationship, with psychological and social struggles. All of the material that ended up on the album was written over a six-week period. DeSantis referred to the album as a "document of the end of our innocence; we had toured for over 2 years non-stop and kind of became alienated from our old selves".

=== Tracks 1–5 ===
"She's the Blade" was written when Pagnotta was playing his guitar in his bedroom. He was noodling with a chord progression that he thought was reminiscent of a transcending keyboard part – which he had admiration for Elvis Costello's attempts at this, namely on his track "Radio Radio". Pagnotta began singing melody lines over his chosen progression until he came up with the lyric "She's the blade and you're just paper", with the rest of the song falling into place afterwards. DeSantis visited Pagnotta and the pair worked on guitar parts, one of which eventually became a keyboard part that Rechtshaid would play on the final recording. Early versions of the song included an intro guitar riff but was scrapped in favour of Livingston's count-in. Similarly the track used to have a middle section of 12-bars that Pagnotta referred to as "bad classic rock", which was removed at MacKillop's insistence.

"Crying" was written over the course of six months, with Pagnotta only having a guitar riff for the pre-chorus and main chorus for long period of time. He said the bridge section was reminiscent of U2, specifically the use of a floor tom to keep time, as heard on some U2 songs on their War (1983) album. He added a guitar solo to the track, three days prior to it being mixed. Though Pagnotta disliked it, MacKillop kept it in the final mix. Cullen is singing harmonies on the song; during the recording of this, and since he felt the ending was too sparse, Pagnotta came up with a lyric for the song's outro. "Memory" was first song finished for the album, dating at least a year prior to when they recorded it. Pagnotta wrote it about a person he met while touring in Boston, Massachusetts. During this time he had just gotten out of a relationship and was cautious about starting another. He began daydreaming about how a relationship with the person from Boston wouldn't work. He then picked up his guitar and started strumming chords, writing what would ultimately become "Memory".

Pagnotta kept "Worst December" a secret for sometime, he reasoned that as the lyrics were "a bit confessional in regards to a relationship", he worried that his partner would find the lyric sheet and they'd "have to confront our issues." The music of the track was influenced by Bright Life, a band from the group's hometown, who Pagnotta applauded for the usage of open chords in their material. Livingston keeps time in the song using the edge of his tom, resulting in a clock-like ticking sound which gave the track "a nice ambient space." It ties into one of the two lyrical themes (space), with the other about being away from home. "Back to California", which had a similar structure to "Stay Together for the Kids" by Blink-182, was written about returning home from touring solely to break up with a partner. When Pagnotta showed the track to Livingston, the pair started talking about Jimmy Eat World's use of hand percussion, which found its way into the song's intro. It featured several stacked vocal parts and call-and-response harmonies during the chorus, which Pagnotta heard when listening to Carpenters albums during his childhood.

=== Tracks 6–12 ===
During an off-day in the first week of pre-production, Pagnotta arrived at the studio early and began playing drums while vocalising melodies. He based this off the group Spoon, whose music arrangements revolved around the drums and vocals. He began singing what would become "Destination Anywhere"; when Livingston arrived at the studio the pair started fleshing out the remainder of the song. At the group's next practice session bassist Airin Older came up with a riff that Pagnotta said was a mix between "New Year's Day" by U2 and several Motown tracks, while DeSantis added stabs in the vein of British mod music. Upon MacKillop hearing it, he remarked it sounded like INXS, to which the band was "all shocked in horror." The vocals for the track had to be re-recorded twice over as MacKillop thought it need to come across as intimate-sounding; a moog riff was added in the bridge.

"Champagne" is about Pagnotta's relationship with the group's former drummer Davis. He started writing it before Davis' departure when he noticed how different Davis was acting since he became an alcoholic. It bounces between first-and-third person views; Pagnotta referred to it as the Cars "on steroids." It was the last track finished during recording, and was mixed by Trombino, which Pagnotta felt added a denser layer to the song that they hadn't thought about. "What You Say" resulted from an in-the-moment jam session between Livingston and Pagnotta. It was compared to the Foo Fighters; the guitar riff specifically recalled the one heard in "Breed" by Nirvana. "Over" existed as a verse section for a few weeks; Pagnotta didn't feel it was fleshed out enough to share with the rest of the band. When the band was recording drums, Pagnotta showed Livingston and MacKillop a complete chorus section. The trio worked on it and planned to record it the following day, which by then they tracked it in 30 minutes. DeSantis suggested a rhythm break before the last chorus, which was then added to the track.

"Head Up" evolved out of an idea that was written backstage during a show while in Belgium. The opening act was playing onstage upstairs while Pagnotta was downstairs attempting to track the idea into his recorder. Unable to hear the key of the chords, he recorded a tiny bit and fleshed out the song during soundcheck with the rest of the band the following day. It talks about remaining positive when you're doing something that other people may not like, something that Pagnotta felt after dropping out of education to focus on music. The chord progression for "Counting Stars" existed for about two months, during this time Pagnotta was unable to come up with any melodies or lyrics. Pagnotta said he received test results from his doctor saying he was ill, only for further results nine days later to say he was okay. Between these results he wrote the lyrics to "Counting Stars", which acted as "an apology for anything I may have done wrong to hurt the world, people, friends." On the final recording, a friend of the band contributed what Pagnotta referred to as"sounds with his guitar that sounded like animals dying." The closing track, "Sign Off", was written by Pagnotta as he sat on the end of his bed. He explained that partway through the making of the album he felt lonely, confused and sad while questioning his life. It was recorded in the back room at the studio solely by Pagnotta, with some overdubs from MacKillop.

== Release ==
On September 24, 2003, Sugarcult mentioned on their website that their next album would appear in February 2004. Between October and December 2003, the group embarked on a headlining US tour with support from Story of the Year, Plain White T's, Jackson and Denver Harbor. During the stint, they played a number of new songs from their forthcoming album. Partway through the excursion, on November 20, 2003, the album's title Palm Trees and Power Lines was revealed. Prior to the tour taking place, an acoustic version of "Memory" was included on the Fearless Records-helmed compilation Punk Goes Acoustic. On December 15, 2003, the album was given an updated release date – March 2004. Following this, the group supported Good Charlotte on their tour of the United Kingdom, before supporting them again on a tour of Japan in January 2004. During the same month, the band filmed a music video for "Memory". On January 15, the band signed to Fearless Records. In January and February, the band supported MxPx and Simple Plan on their co-headlining US tour. On February 25, the album's track listing was revealed. The music video for "Memory" was posted online on March 11, 2004. The song was released to radio on March 16; the CD single featured "Blackout" and an acoustic version of "Memory".

After being originally scheduled for release on March 9, Palm Trees and Power Lines was eventually released on April 13. The artwork continues the Californian theme of the title with an actress in front of the palm trees and electrical lines that make up the album's namesake. Though DeSantis claimed it wasn't wholly a tribute to California, he explained that with the band frequently touring other countries "you sort of have a concept of home, and the more you're gone ... it becomes even more blurry, but it is home nonetheless. And California represents that for us." Ultimatum Music sold the rights to Palm Trees and Power Lines to Artemis Records, who partnered up with Fearless Records. Pagnotta explained they need a larger amount of label staff to handle the album; Ultimatum had downsized its operations while the group now worked with the same people at Artemis that had helped for Static Static. Epitaph wasn't interested in the album, after struggling to break the band in the UK/Europe, resulting in Rykodisc handling the release for that region. The Japanese edition, released through independent label Maximum10, featured "Blackout" as a bonus track.

The group had to cancel the first week of touring for the album due to Pagnotta suffering from tinnitus. When touring restarted, the band did a round of acoustic shows; their headlining US tour continued into May, when they embarked on a Japanese tour. Following the release, the band performed on the Warped Tour between mid July and mid August. "She's the Blade" was released to radio on August 31; the CD single featured a Mark Trombine mix of "Destination Anywhere", a live version of "Stuck in America", and the music video for "She's the Blade". The computer-generated video sees the group acting as doctors and operating on a girl; Pagnotta likened the clip to Weird Science (1985). In October and November, the group supported Green Day on their headlining US tour. The group closed the year supporting Blink-182 on their European tour. The band headlined the US Take Action Tour in February and March 2005, followed by another support slot for Green Day on their Japanese tour. They released their first video album, Back to Disaster, in November 2005, which featured footage from the previous few years of touring.

== Reception ==
Professional ratings
Review scores
Source	Rating
AllMusic	3/5 stars
Drowned in Sound	6/10
Melodic	3.5/5 stars
Rock Hard	7/10
Rolling Stone	2/5 stars
Spin	C−

Palm Trees and Power Lines was met with mixed reviews from music critics. AllMusic reviewer Johnny Loftus said it "might not be as direct" as their past releases, "meaning they want to trade a bit of the bubblegum for some mall-punk songwriting cred". He added that the "hooks are more murky [...] perhaps the bandmembers are aiming for some 'seriousness' this time around". Drowned in Sound writer Mike Diver felt that the band had toned down the "cheese and upped its angst", saying that have a "collective ear for a pop tune" that their contemporaries lacked. Though he summarised the album as "throwaway stuff for sure," it was a "blast while it lasts". Azeem Ahmad of musicOMH said the album was not "original, there's no question about that. But its brilliance lies in the fact that the best of other influences have been thrown into the equation, making a finished product that is pretty damn good". PopMatters' Stephen Haag felt that it "strives for the growth attained by the above-mentioned band, but comes up short". He explained that the reason was all the "too much damn moping". He added that acts like Sugarcult are not "popular for their introspection; they're popular for their guitar hooks and general catchiness".

DJ of CMU Daily wrote that while it had "few surprises on this long player, but there's plenty of satisfying tracks and much evidence of a progression in the Californian band's sound". The staff at Modern Fix saw it as a "strong" effort from the band, who "keeps it sweet with some dreamy lyrics for the younger fans, while touching on a hard edge for the older listeners". Melodic writer Andrew Ellis said that apart from a " few obligatory ballads which are just ok, this sweetheart of a CD shows that the band deserves to become an even bigger player in the game of major label rock". Rock Hard writer Marcus Schleutermann thought that the tracks were "just as casual as the album title". He praised the band's "knack for beautiful vocal melodies and well-rounded arrangements, [...] but in this form it all sounds too good, boring to me and interchangeable". Rolling Stone reviewer Christian Hoard thought that for each "woozily nostalgic or promisingly toothy moment [...] there's a torrent of youthful wallowing on its way. The craftsmanship on Palm Trees shows Sugarcult are moving toward adulthood, but for now they're still mad for sadness". The staff at Spin wrote that there was "something kinda sweet about pop-punk bands that express their everydude empathy by being as uninspired as the kids they would love to reach".

Palm Trees and Power Lines sold 22,000 copies, reaching number 46 on the Billboard 200.

== Track listing ==
All lyrics by Tim Pagnotta, all music by Pagnotta and Sugarcult.

1. "She's the Blade" – 2:59
2. "Crying" – 3:29
3. "Memory" – 3:46
4. "Worst December" – 3:37
5. "Back to California" – 4:07
6. "Destination Anywhere" – 3:51
7. "Champagne" – 2:56
8. "What You Say" – 2:39
9. "Over" – 3:24
10. "Head Up" – 3:56
11. "Counting Stars" – 3:38
12. "Sign Off" – 2:13

Japanese bonus track

13. "Blackout" – 3:10

== Personnel ==
Personnel per booklet.

Sugarcult

- Tim Pagnotta – lead vocals, rhythm guitar
- Marko DeSantis – lead guitar
- Airin Older – bass, vocals
- Kenny Livingston – drums

Additional musicians

- Tim Cullen – additional vocals
- Alain Johannes – additional guitar
- John Nooney – keyboards
- Ariel Rechtshaid – keyboards
- Trent Slatton – programming

Production

- Gavin Mackillop – producer, recording; mixing (tracks 6, 8, 10 and 11)
- Nick Condodina – enhanced CD footage
- Sim Klugerman – enhanced CD footage
- Sugarcult – enhanced CD footage
- John Logsdon – enhanced CD editing
- Piper Ferguson – band photos
- Lisa Johnson – band photos
- Yoshika Horita – band photos
- Gregg Kulick – art direction, design
- Tom Lord-Alge – mixing (tracks 1–3, 5 and 9)
- Mark Trombino – mixing (tracks 4 and 7)
- Alan Mason – mixing assistant
- Evan Frankfort – mixing (track 12)
- Brian Gardner – mastering
- Wesley Seidman – assistant engineer
- John Nooney – Pro-Tools engineer
- Mauro Rubbi – Pro-Tools engineer, drum tech
- Trent Slatton – Pro-Tools engineer
- Tim Pagnotta – additional production

== Charts ==
=== Weekly charts ===
Weekly chart performance
Chart (2004)	Peak position
Japanese Albums (Oricon)	24
UK Albums (Official Charts)	140
UK Independent Albums (Official Charts)	15
UK Rock & Metal Albums (Official Charts)	14
US Billboard 200	46
US Independent Albums (Billboard)	1

=== Year-end charts ===
Year-end chart performance
Chart (2004)	Position
US Independent Albums (Billboard)	9
