= Patrice Fisher =

American actress

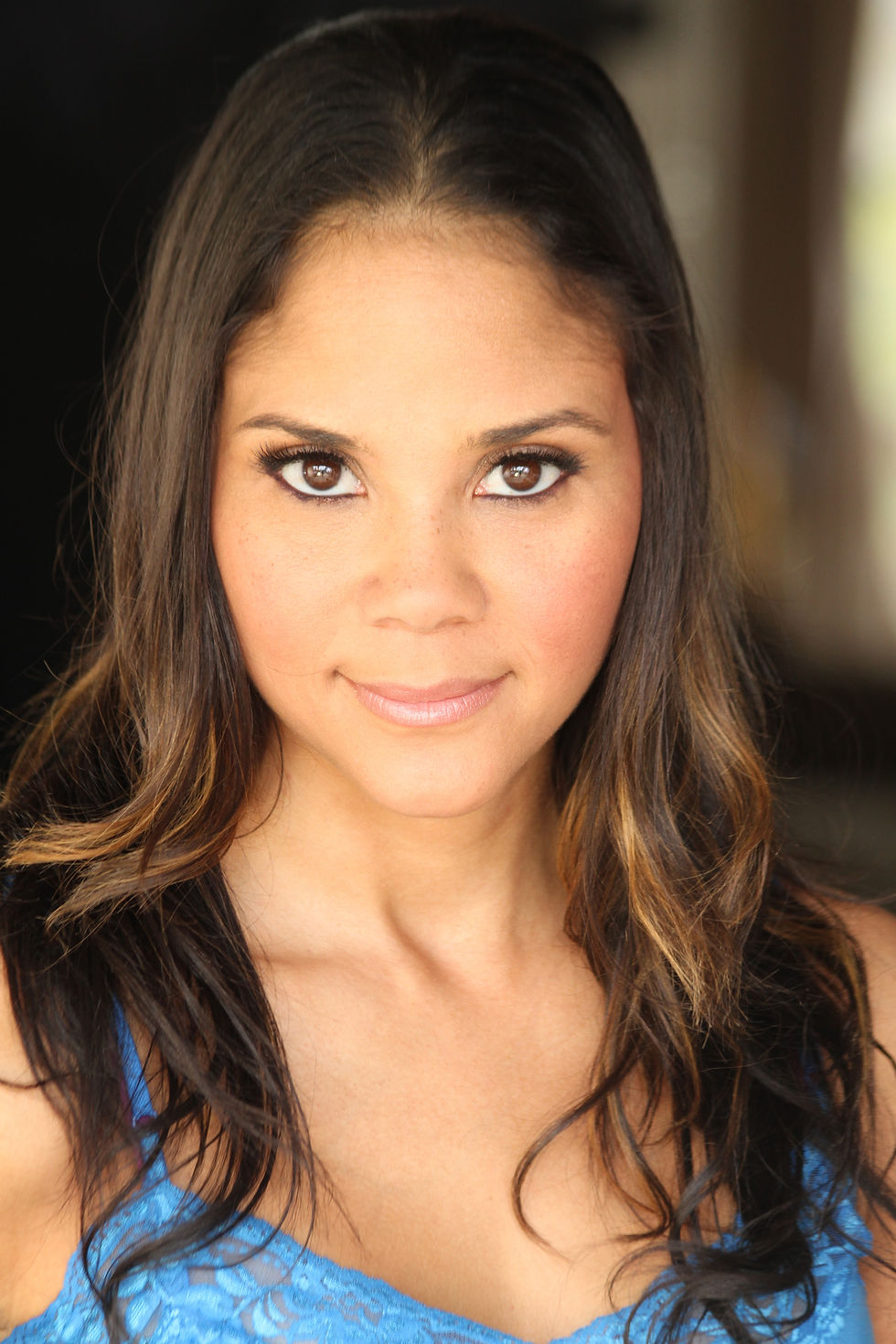
- Occupation: Actress
- Years active: 2001–present

Patrice Fisher is an American actress best known for her lead role as Patience James in the Cinemax television series Zane's Sex Chronicles.

== Career ==
Patrice Fisher was raised in a military family. At a young age she decided she wanted to be an entertainer. She moved to Los Angeles to model but soon discovered her love of acting, and picked up her first role as one of the prostitutes in the movie How High, featuring rappers Method Man and Redman. Fisher appears on the Cinemax TV series Zane's Sex Chronicles as the lead character Patience James. She has also guest starred on the TV series Boston Public; Yes, Dear; CSI and a recurring role in the TV series Charmed as the character Avatar Beta. She appears in the music video for Avant's single "4 Minutes".

== Filmography ==
=== Film ===
Year	Title	Role	Notes
2001	Stranger Inside	Sugar	TV movie
2001	Carmen: A Hip Hopera	Jealous Woman	TV movie
2001	How High	End Table Ass	
2002	The Country Bears	Backup Singer	
2002	Austin Powers in Goldmember	Dancer	
2002	Almost a Woman	Gang Girl	TV movie
2004	Doing Hard Time	Lt. Elaine Lodge	Video
2004	Trois: The Escort	Kyria Bynam	Video
2006	Behind the Smile	Regina	
2006	Big Top	Rose	
2007	4 Life	Gena	Video
2007	The Stolen Moments of September	Corina Hire	
2009	Permagrin	Kelly	
2013	Dearly Departed	Maya Thibodeaux	
2013	Comedy of Errorz	Voluptuous Servants	
2014	Men, Money & Gold Diggers	Paisley	
2016	Hollywood Hearts	India	TV movie
2016	Ulterior Motives: Reality TV Massacre	Desiree Taylor	
2017	The Job Interview	Mina	
2018	Raggity Anns	Nola	Short
2019	Everyday But Christmas	Katie	
2019	Before Dawn Breaks	Mya	
2021	Saints & Sinners Judgment Day	Stacia Cunningham	TV movie
2022	Super Turnt	Monique	
2023	Fancy Dance	Ruth	
2024	Zane's the Other Side of the Pillow	Jemistry	Video

=== Television ===
Year	Title	Role	Notes
2003	Boston Public	Uniqua	Episode: "Chapter Fifty-Three"
2003	CSI: Crime Scene Investigation	Sports Bar Waitress	Episode: "All for Our Country"
2004	Yes, Dear	Bess	Episode: "Mama Said Knock You Out"
2004–2005	Charmed	Avatar Beta	Recurring Cast: Season 7
2005	CSI: NY	Jamie Banks	Episode: "The Dove Commission"
2008–2010	Zane's Sex Chronicles	Patience James	Main Cast
2012	Front Seat Chronicles	Vera	Episode: "If I Tell U"
2014	Next Up	Santana Daniels	Recurring Cast
2015	Stitchers	LAPD Cop	Episode: "Finally"
2016–2017	If Loving You Is Wrong	Dispatcher	Recurring Cast: Season 2
2017–2022	Saints & Sinners	Stacia Cunningham	Recurring Cast: Season 2–6
2019	Boomerang	Selena	Episode: "The Let Out"
2019	Last Call	Rose	Episode: "The Great Pretender"
2021	BMF	Edna	Episode: "Heroes"
2021	Dopesick	Methadone Clinic Nurse	Episode: "Hammer the Abusers"
2022	Dynasty	Joyce	Episode: "A Real Actress Could Do It"
2022	First Kill	Ms. Mederos	Episode: "First Love"
2022	Tales	Mrs. Jones	Episode: "Fight the Power"
2022–2023	Kingdom Business	Detective Juanita Parker	Recurring Cast
2023	Found	Rosario Mendez	Episode: "Pilot"
2024	All the Queen's Men	Yolanda	Episode: "The Ultimate Price"

=== Video Game ===
Year	Title	Role
2009	The Chronicles of Riddick: Assault on Dark Athena	Grinder (voice)
