= Zane (author) =

Pseudonym of author Kristina Laferne Roberts

- Born: Kristina Laferne Roberts; 1966 or 1967 (age 59–60); Washington, D.C., U.S.
- Occupation: Writer
- Writing career
- Period: 1997–present
- Genre: Erotic fiction

Kristina Laferne Roberts (born 1966/1967), known by her pen name Zane, is an American author of erotic fiction novels. She is most notable for her novel Addicted.

== Biography ==
Kristina Laferne Roberts grew up in Washington, D.C., and Silver Spring, Maryland. Her father, J. Deotis Roberts, was an influential theologian and author, and her mother Elizabeth Caldwell Roberts was an elementary school teacher. Roberts attended Spelman College in Atlanta for one year, then moved Howard University to major in chemical engineering (without graduating).

In 1997, Zane began writing erotic stories to pass the time after her children went to bed. She was living in North Carolina and working as a sales representative. The stories developed a following on the Internet and she self-published The Sex Chronicles before landing a deal with Simon & Schuster. Zane is the publisher of Strebor Books (now part of Atria Books at Simon & Schuster), where she publishes 36–60 books a year by other authors.

Her work was the basis for the Cinemax program Zane's Sex Chronicles. A subsequent project, Zane's The Jump Off, premiered March 29, 2013, on Cinemax. The first feature film based on one of her works, Addicted, was released by Lionsgate on October 10, 2014.

In 2014, she was cited by Comptroller of Maryland Peter Franchot as one of Maryland's top tax cheats, owing the state $340,833.58. On June 11, 2014, Zane filed for Chapter 7 bankruptcy in U.S. Bankruptcy Court in Maryland, claiming total liabilities of more than $3.4 million.

Her work is mentioned in sociologist Shayne Lee's book Erotic Revolutionaries: Black Women, Sexuality, and Popular Culture. In it, Lee discusses Zane's work as an example of "urban erotica [that helps] create safe spaces for black female characters to explore lust and embark upon sexual experimentation."

== Bibliography ==
Zane's publications as author or editor include:

- The Sex Chronicles: Shattering the Myth
- Addicted
- Shame On It All
- Gettin’ Buck Wild: Sex Chronicles II
- The Heat Seekers
- Nervous
- The Sisters of APF
- Skyscraper
- Afterburn
- Dear G-Spot: Straight Talk about Sex and Love
- Zane’s Sex Chronicles
- Head Bangers: An APF Sexcapade
- Total Eclipse of the Heart
- Love Is Never Painless
- Flava Series: Honey Flava, Caramel Flava, Chocolate Flava
- Purple Panties
- Missionary No More
- The Hot Box
- Vengeance
- The Other Side of the Pillow (2018)
