= Van Wilder =

2002 comedy film directed by Walt Becker

National Lampoon's Van Wilder
- Theatrical release poster
- Directed by: Walt Becker
- Written by: Brent Goldberg; David T. Wagner
- Produced by: Peter Abrams; Robert L. Levy; Andrew Panay; Jonathon Komack Martin
- Starring: Ryan Reynolds; Tara Reid
- Cinematography: James Bagdonas
- Edited by: Dennis M. Hill
- Music by: David Lawrence
- Production companies: Myriad Pictures; Tapestry Films
- Distributed by: Artisan Entertainment (United States); Constantin Film (Germany); Myriad Pictures (Overseas)
- Release date: April 5, 2002
- Running time: 93 minutes
- Countries: Germany; United States
- Language: English
- Budget: $5 million
- Box office: $38.3 million

National Lampoon's Van Wilder (also known as Van Wilder: Party Liaison in certain countries) is a 2002 romantic comedy film directed by Walt Becker in his directorial debut and written by Brent Goldberg and David T. Wagner. The film stars Ryan Reynolds as the titular character, alongside Tara Reid, Tim Matheson and Paul Gleason.

The film received negative reviews from critics and grossed $38.3 million worldwide. A sequel, Van Wilder: The Rise of Taj, was released on December 1, 2006. A prequel, Van Wilder: Freshman Year, was released straight-to-DVD on July 14, 2009.

== Plot ==
Vance "Van" Wilder is a confident and sardonic seventh-year senior at Coolidge College who spends his days driving around campus in his customized golf cart, posing nude for figure drawing classes and organizing soirees and fundraisers for his peers. His father severs financial support upon learning that his son is still in school.

Van seeks a payment extension from the registrar, Deloris Haver. After copulating with her, she hands him the paperwork for an extension, whereupon Van realizes he only needed to ask for it.

After a couple of attempts to get money fast, Van is approached by the Lambda Omega Omega fraternity, offering to pay him one thousand dollars to throw them a blowout party to boost their popularity. Gwen Pearson, a reporter for the school paper, writes a story crediting Van as the party's host. Van, who usually refuses to do interviews for the paper, realizes the article can be the "cash cow" he needs to stay in school and agrees to sit down with Gwen for a follow-up piece.

Gwen's boyfriend, Richard "Dick" Bagg, is a pre-med student and the president of his fraternity Delta Iota Kappa, as well as of the student government. As he learns of Gwen's work with Van, suspecting a growing bond between them, he moves to sabotage their prospective romance.

Van and Richard exchange escalating pranks. Gwen learns that Van stopped attending classes years ago, eighteen credits short of graduation. Furious that she dug into such personal details, he disassociates himself from her, taking a contemplative look at his life.

Richard arranges to sabotage Van's latest party with Jeannie, a member of a sister sorority, by smuggling children in and getting them intoxicated, then calling campus police to the scene. Van is arrested for providing alcohol to minors and faces expulsion from Coolidge. He prepares to leave the college until his friend Taj inspires him to fight the charges.

Van throws himself at the mercy of the court, asking that rather than expelling him, they force him to graduate. He offers to complete his remaining credits before the semester ends, earning a degree in leisure studies. The academic board votes three to two in favor of Van's reinstatement; the decisive vote is surprisingly cast by his least favorite professor, McDougal. Van begins studying for the finals, which will be held in six days.

Outside the court, Jeannie reveals Richard's plot to Gwen and his infidelity. An outraged Gwen then proceeds to sabotage Richard by spiking his protein shake with a powerful laxative just before his entrance exam to Northwestern Medical School. Once it takes effect, Richard hurries down the line with his exam, not even reading the questions due to his dire need for release.

As he hurries to a restroom, Richard is intercepted by his future alumni, intending to interview him for his entrance. Unable to hold it in any longer, Richard proceeds to defecate violently in a wastebasket in front of the doctors, much to their horror and disgust.

Van uses the entire exam period for his last final with McDougal, who later informs that he passed. McDougal explains that he had been so harsh on Van all those years because he believed that he was not living up to his potential, not because he had additionally hooked up with McDougal's daughter freshman year.

Gwen finishes her article on Van for the graduation issue. In it, she reveals his many contributions to the students and staff of Coolidge in the last seven years, his superhuman accomplishment of doing a semester's worth of studying in just six days and Richard's plot to have him expelled, whose reputation and medical school dreams are now in shambles.

The university celebrates Van's graduation with a wild party in his honor. After reading Gwen's article, his father admits that he was wrong and expresses his pride in Van's success. Gwen arrives, lovingly reuniting with Van.

== Cast ==
- Ryan Reynolds as Vance "Van" Wilder, Jr.
- Tara Reid as Gwen Pearson
- Kal Penn as Taj Mahal Badalandabad
- Tim Matheson as Vance Wilder, Sr.
- Paul Gleason as Professor McDougal
- Daniel Cosgrove as Richard Bagg
- Tom Howard as Doctor Pearson
- Darcy Shean as Mrs. Pearson
- Harry Danner as Doctor Beeverman
- John Colton as Doctor Henke
- Teck Holmes as Hutch
- Emily Rutherfurd as Jeannie
- Curtis Armstrong as Officer Gibson
- Deon Richmond as "Mini Cochran"
- Alex Burns as Gordon
- Chris Owen as Timmy
- Ivana Božilović as Naomi
- Sophia Bush as Sally
- Lydia Hull as Lindsey
- Cynthia Fancher as Ms. Haver
- Simon Helberg as Vernon
- Quentin Richardson as "Q"
- Michael Olowokandi as Leron
- Darius Miles as Darius
- Erik Estrada as himself
- Edie McClurg as a local tour guide
- Michael Waltman as Coach Ken Massey
- Aaron Paul as a student that Van's father talks to
- Teresa Hill as an attractive doctor
- Doctor Joyce Brothers as herself
- Tom Everett Scott (uncredited) as Elliot Grebb
- Walt Becker (uncredited) as a firefighter
- Lamar Odom (uncredited) as a player for the Coolidge Chickadees

== Production ==
The role of Taj Mahal was down to between Kal Penn and a white actor in "brownface", Penn felt motivated to get the role after seeing the other actor during the audition process. After getting cast, Penn helped to get the character rewritten, who was initially written with stereotypical traits.

== Soundtrack ==
The soundtrack album was released on March 26, 2002 by Ultimatum Music and Artemis Records.

1. "Roll On" – The Living End (Chris Cheney)
2. "Bleed American" – Jimmy Eat World (Jimmy Eat World)
3. "Hit the Ground" – 6gig (6gig)
4. "Bouncing Off the Walls" – Sugarcult (Sugarcult)
5. "I'm a Fool" – American Hi-Fi (Stacy Jones)
6. "Girl On the Roof" – David Mead
7. "Things Are Getting Better" – N*E*R*D (Chad Hugo, Pharrell)
8. "Okay" – Swirl 360 (Denny & Kenny Scott, Tonio K)
9. "Blind Spot" – Transmatic (Transmatic)
10. "Makes No Difference" – Sum 41 (Sum 41)
11. "At Auntie Tom's" – Fuzz Townshend (Fuzz Townshend, Matt Machin, Roger Charlery)
12. "Little Man (2002 Mix)" – Sia (Sia Furler, Sam Frank)
13. "Start Over" – Abandoned Pools (Tommy Walter, Pete Pagonis)
14. "You Get Me" – Michelle Branch (Michelle Branch)

The song "Show Me" by Mint Royale is featured in the movie, although it is not included on the official soundtrack.

== Release ==
=== Home media ===
Van Wilder was released via VHS and DVD by Artisan Entertainment on August 20, 2002. The DVD was presented in rated and unrated editions, both editions containing a cropped full-frame transfer, and a widescreen version in its original 1.85:1 aspect ratio. The two-disc set also contained deleted scenes, outtakes, three Burly Bear TV specials, a Comedy Central: Reel Comedy TV special, "Bouncing Off the Walls" music video performed by Sugarcult, trailers, and other promotional material like television ads and poster art.

On November 28, 2006, as a way of promoting the sequel to Van Wilder, The Rise of Taj, Lions Gate Home Entertainment released a 2-disc special edition DVD with new bonus features including a "Drunken Idiot Kommentary" (featuring National Lampoon editors Steven Brykman and Mason Brown), behind-the-scenes footage, and interviews with the cast and crew.

The film was also released on Blu-ray on August 21, 2007, which had almost the same features as the 2-disc special edition DVD. Also included (and exclusive to the Blu-ray edition) is the "Blu-Book Exam", an interactive game that focuses on Van Wilder trivia questions, plus a series of "Blu-line" options including a pop-up film-progression menu that allows the viewer to set bookmarks and skip around the feature film. The film was released on 4K UHD Blu-Ray on August 14, 2018.

== Reception ==
=== Box office ===
Van Wilder opened with $7,302,913, ranking number 6 at the domestic box office. It grossed $21,305,259 domestically with $16,970,224 internationally for a worldwide total of $38,275,483. Based on a $5 million budget, the film was a box office success.

=== Critical response ===
On the review aggregator website Rotten Tomatoes, 18% of 96 critics' reviews are positive, with an average rating of 3.6/10. The website's consensus reads: "A derivative gross-out comedy that's short on laughs." Metacritic, which uses a weighted average, assigned the film a score of 26 out of 100, based on 24 critics, indicating "generally unfavorable" reviews. Audiences surveyed by CinemaScore gave the film a grade "C+" on scale of A to F.

== Sequel ==
A sequel, entitled The Rise of Taj, followed this, centering on the character of Taj Mahal Badalandabad. The film was released theatrically in 2006 by Metro-Goldwyn-Mayer and produced by Bauer Martinez.

== Prequel ==
A direct-to-DVD prequel to this film was also released in 2009 by Paramount Pictures under its Paramount Famous Productions label, entitled Freshman Year; the film follows Van as he deals with his freshman year of college.
