= Sugarcult =

American rock band

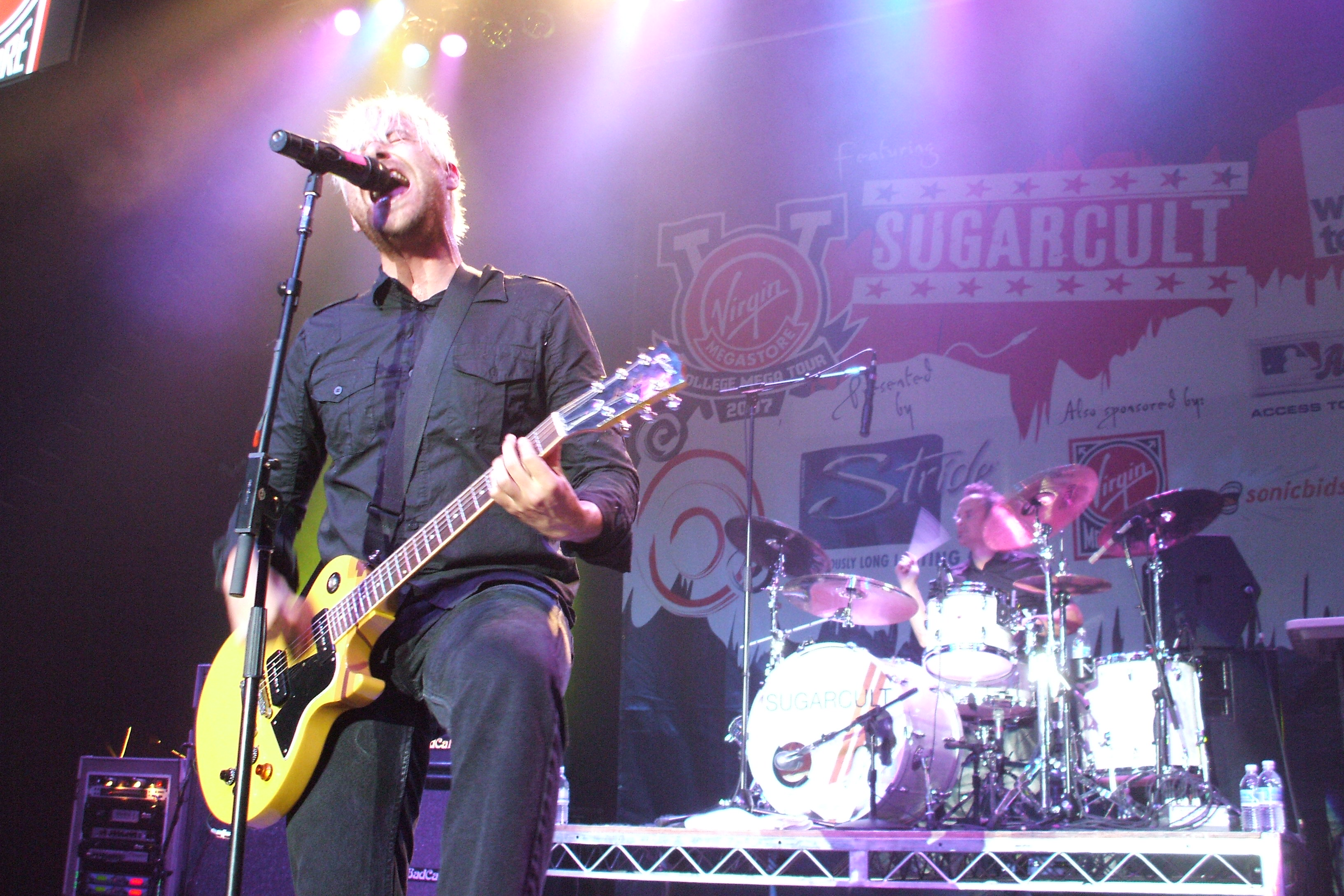
- Sugarcult performing in 2007

Background information
- Origin: Santa Barbara, California, United States
- Genres: Punk rock; pop-punk; power pop; alternative rock
- Years active: 1998–2011 (Note: Indefinite hiatus)
- Labels: Cooler; Ultimatum; Artemis; Epitaph; Fearless; V2
- Past members: Kenny Livingston; Tim Pagnotta; Airin Older; Marko DeSantis; Ben Davis

Sugarcult was an American rock band from Santa Barbara, California, formed in 1998. The band consisted of Tim Pagnotta (vocals, rhythm guitar), Airin Older (bass), Marko DeSantis (lead guitar), and Kenny Livingston (drums). They are best known for their 2001 debut album Start Static, which featured the hit singles "Stuck in America", "Bouncing Off the Walls", and "Pretty Girl (The Way)". Original drummer Ben Davis left the group in 2003 to seek treatment for alcoholism and was replaced by Kenny Livingston, although Davis would rejoin the band in 2011.

== History ==
=== Formation (1998–99) ===
As a child, frontman Tim Pagnotta moved around a lot, living in thirteen different homes and going to nine different schools before graduating from high school. As a result he had a hard time fitting in; as an escape, Pagnotta turned to music. In 1997, Pagnotta moved to Santa Barbara, California and eventually met ex-drummer Ben Davis during a cigarette break at Santa Barbara City College. Davis, who had recently quit his job at Denny's in Boulder, Colorado to pursue his musical career on the West Coast, and Pagnotta started to play together on a regular basis. Although Davis began playing drums when he was just 9 years old, his musical aspirations were grand. He now plays a multitude of instruments and was producing local Santa Barbara bands when the two hooked up.

Pagnotta met Airin Older in a music class where Pagnotta was copying Older's work. They became good friends and Pagnotta invited Older to join his band. Davis moved to the position of drummer and Older filled in for Davis on bass. Marko DeSantis was added into the band after meeting Pagnotta backstage at a Superdrag concert. The name "Sugarcult" was originally the name of seven lesbians that lived across the hall from Pagnotta in Santa Barbara City College; the song Debbie was written about the leader of the group when he has a crush on her.

=== Early releases (1999–2003) ===
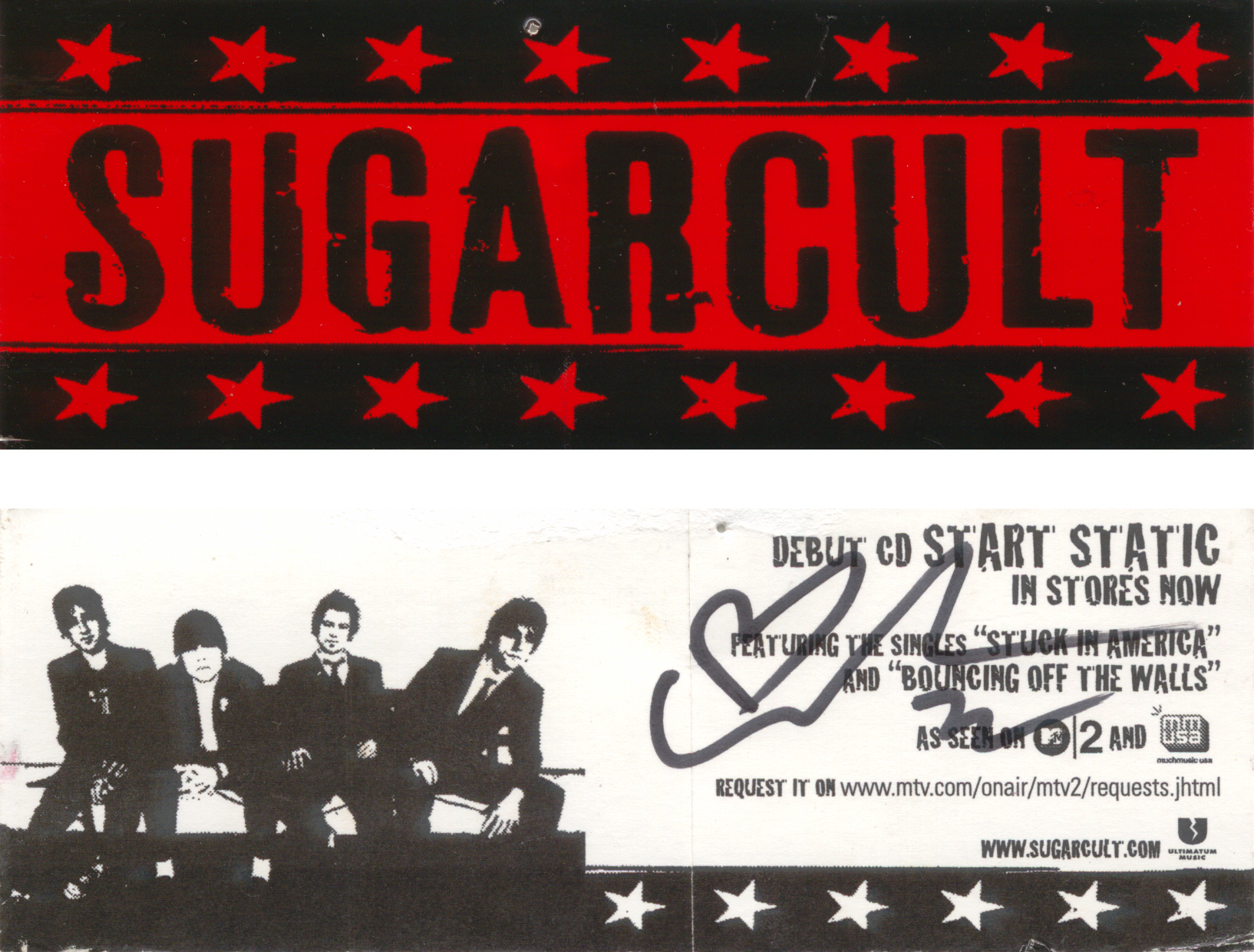
An ad for the band's debut album Start Static (2001)

Sugarcult released their first collection of demo recordings, Eleven, in 1999. Their second collection, Wrap Me Up in Plastic, was released in 2000. The group sent demos to record labels, eventually signing to independent label Ultimatum Music in January 2001. In August 2001, the band released their debut album, Start Static, which featured the hit singles "Pretty Girl", "Bouncing Off The Walls" (also featured in the movie and soundtrack to National Lampoon's Van Wilder) and "Stuck in America". In early 2003, "Stuck in America" won the Los Angeles Regional Poll in The 2nd Annual Independent Music Awards. Start Static featured several songs that had previously been released as demos on Wrap Me Up in Plastic. In May 2001, the band re-released Wrap Me Up in Plastic with a new track listing that included songs from both Eleven and the original Wrap Me Up in Plastic, as well as new artwork. In 2003, Davis officially left Sugarcult. Davis had been regularly missing shows since the release of Start Static, and left Sugarcult to enter rehab to get help for his alcoholism. Pagnotta was close to Davis, and wrote the song "Champagne" about his addictions when he was forced to leave the band.

=== Later releases (2004–2008) ===
On April 13, 2004, Sugarcult released Palm Trees and Power Lines and performed on Late Night with Conan O'Brien. This album featured the MTV hits "Memory" and "She's the Blade". Sugarcult successfully landed a spot on the Warped Tour 2004 main stage and they also supported Green Day on their American Idiot tour and Blink-182 on their December 2004 European tour. They released Back to the Disaster, a feature-length documentary film (with a bonus live EP), in late 2005. Lights Out, their latest studio album, was released on September 12, 2006. The release of Lights Out was immediately followed by two tours, a fall tour and a winter tour. Their fall tour included So They Say, Maxeen, Halifax, and The Spill Canvas. Their winter tour included such bands as Meg and Dia, Damone, The Pink Spiders, All Time Low, and The Adored. In 2006, Sugarcult song "Do It Alone" was featured on the CW's show One Tree Hill during Season and in the film Employee of the Month. Sugarcult played at the Soundwave Tour in 2008.

=== Hiatus and occasional shows (2009–present) ===
The band members took a year off in 2009 from Sugarcult for their 10-year anniversary to do their own side-projects. They were neither broken up, nor were known to be working on new Sugarcult material as of mid-2010.

At the end of 2010, they announced that they would play at least two shows in the United Kingdom and then perform at the Belgium music festival Groezrock, all at the end of April.

Sugarcult reunited with Davis to play a one-off show at the Chain Reaction in Anaheim, California on December 10, 2011, where they celebrated the tenth anniversary of the release of Start Static. More recently, members of the group performed with members of 5 Seconds of Summer (who have cited Sugarcult as a primary influence on their band) and past tourmate Goldfinger frontman and acclaimed record producer John Feldmann for Strange '80s, a benefit concert on May 14, 2017, at the Fonda Theatre.

== Musical style and influences ==
Sugarcult has been categorized as punk rock, pop-punk, power pop and alternative rock. Jamie Allen of CNN described the band's sound as "a melodic, power-pop vibe reminiscent of the Knack crossed with the Ramones and Elvis Costello." The band has drawn comparisons to American Hi-Fi, Rancid, Unwritten Law, Blink-182, Less Than Jake, Good Charlotte, The Hives and Jimmy Eat World. Sugarcult cites The Beatles, the Police, The Clash, Ramones, Sex Pistols, the Jam, Elvis Costello, the Romantics and The Suicide Commandos as influences. Lyrically, Sugarcult explores themes of relationships, youth angst, and introspection.

== Band members ==
Final lineup

- Tim Pagnotta – lead vocals, rhythm guitar (1998–2009, 2011), lead guitar (1998–1999)
- Airin Older – bass guitar, backing vocals (1998–2009, 2011)
- Marko DeSantis – lead guitar (1999–2009, 2011)
- Ben Davis – drums, backing vocals (1998–2003, 2011)

Former

- Kenny Livingston – drums (2003–2009)

Timeline

== Discography ==
=== Demo collections ===
- Eleven (1999)
- Wrap Me Up in Plastic (2000)

=== Studio albums ===
Title	Details	Peak chart positions
Title	Details	US
Start Static	Released: August 21, 2001; Label: Ultimatum; Formats: CD, LP, digital download, streaming	194
Palm Trees and Power Lines	Released: April 13, 2004; Label: Fearless, Artemis; Formats: CD, LP, digital download, streaming	46
Lights Out	Released: September 12, 2006; Label: Fearless, V2; Formats: CD, LP, digital download, streaming	64

=== DVDs/retrospectives/live albums ===
- Action DVD (2002)
- Back to the Disaster: A Film About Sugarcult DVD/EP (2005)
- Rewind 2001–2008 Japanese Exclusive (2008)

=== EPs ===
- Five Demo (1998)
- Get Street Cred Demo (1999)
- A Hard Day's Night Japanese Exclusive (2006)

=== Singles ===
Year	Title	Album	US Alternative Songs position	UK Singles Chart position
2001	"Bouncing Off the Walls"	Start Static	40	98
2001	"Stuck in America"	Start Static	—	91
2002	"Pretty Girl (The Way)"	Start Static	30	—
2004	"She's the Blade"	Palm Trees and Power Lines	—	—
2004	"Memory"	Palm Trees and Power Lines	—	—
2006	"Do It Alone"	Lights Out	40	—
2006	"Los Angeles"	Lights Out	—	—

== Media appearances ==
- Burnout 3: Takedown (2004)
  - "Memory" was featured on the soundtrack.
- Burnout Dominator (2007), Burnout Paradise (2008), and Burnout Paradise Remastered (2018)
  - Dead Living was featured on the soundtrack.
