= List of Lafayette Leopards football seasons =

The following is a list of Lafayette Leopards football seasons for the football team that has represented Lafayette College.

== Seasons ==
Year	Coach	Overall	Conference	Standing	Bowl/playoffs	Coaches^{#}	AP^{°}
Independent (1882–1885)
1882	No coach	0–2					
1883	No coach	2–4					
1884	No coach	2–5					
1885	No coach	3–2–1					
1886	No coach	10–2					
1887	No coach	7–2					
1888	No coach	6–3					
1889	No coach	3–4–2					
1890	No coach	2–5–1					
1891	Wallace Moyle	2–9–1					
1892	Wallace Moyle	5–7					
1893	Pearl T. Haskell & H. H. Vincent	3–6					
1894	Hugh Janeway & H. H. Vincent	5–6					
1895	Parke H. Davis	6–2					
1896	Parke H. Davis	11–0–1					
1897	Parke H. Davis	9–2–1					
1898	Samuel B. Newton	3–8					
1899	Samuel B. Newton	12–1					
1900	Samuel B. Newton	9–2					
1901	Samuel B. Newton	9–3					
1902	Dave Fultz	8–3					
1903	Alfred E. Bull	7–3					
1904	Alfred E. Bull	8–2					
1905	Alfred E. Bull	7–2–1					
1906	Alfred E. Bull	8–1–1					
1907	Alfred E. Bull	7–2–1					
1908	George Barclay	6–2–2					
1909	Bob Folwell	7–0–1					
1910	Bob Folwell	7–2					
1911	Bob Folwell / Samuel B. Newton	8–2					
1912	George McCaa	4–5–1					
1913	George McCaa	4–5–1					
1914	Wilmer G. Crowell	5–3–2					
1915	Wilmer G. Crowell	8–3					
1916	Wilmer G. Crowell	2–6–1					
1917	Punk Berryman	3–5					
1918	Lewis A. Cobbett	3–4					
1919	Jock Sutherland	6–2					
1920	Jock Sutherland	5–3					
1921	Jock Sutherland	9–0					
1922	Jock Sutherland	7–2					
1923	Jock Sutherland	6–1–2					
1924	Herb McCracken	7–2					
1925	Herb McCracken	7–1–1					
1926	Herb McCracken	9–0					
1927	Herb McCracken	5–3–1					
1928	Herb McCracken	6–1–2					
1929	Herb McCracken	3–5					
1930	Herb McCracken	5–3–1					
1931	Herb McCracken	7–2					
1932	Herb McCracken	3–5					
1933	Herb McCracken	3–5–1					
1934	Herb McCracken	2–6					
1935	Herb McCracken	2–7					
1936	Ernie Nevers	1–8					
1937	Edward Mylin	8–0					
1938	Edward Mylin	5–3					
1939	Edward Mylin	4–5					
1940	Edward Mylin	9–0					19
1941	Edward Mylin	5–4					
1942	Edward Mylin	3–5–1					
1943	Ben Wolfson	4–1					
1944	Ben Wolfson	6–1					
1945	Ben Wolfson	1–7–1					
1946	Edward Mylin	2–7					
1947	Ivy Williamson	6–3					
1948	Ivy Williamson	7–2					
1949	Maurice J. "Clipper" Smith	2–6					
1950	Maurice J. "Clipper" Smith	1–8					
1951	Maurice J. "Clipper" Smith	1–7					
1952	Steve Hokuf	0–9					
1953	Steve Hokuf	5–4					
1954	Steve Hokuf	4–5					
1955	Steve Hokuf	6–2					
1956	Steve Hokuf	6–3					
1957	Steve Hokuf	4–4					
1958	James McConlogue	5–3–1					
1959	James McConlogue	5–4					
1960	James McConlogue	5–4					
1961	James McConlogue	2–6–1					
1962	James McConlogue	3–6					
1963	Kenneth Bunn	1–8					
1964	Kenneth Bunn	0–7–2					
1965	Kenneth Bunn	3–7					
1966	Kenneth Bunn	3–6					
1967	Harry Gamble	4–5					
1968	Harry Gamble	7–3					
1969	Harry Gamble	4–6					
1970	Harry Gamble	6–5					
1971	Neil Putnam	5–5					
1972	Neil Putnam	3–7					
1973	Neil Putnam	6–3–1					
1974	Neil Putnam	3–7					
1975	Neil Putnam	5–5					
1976	Neil Putnam	5–5					
1977	Neil Putnam	5–6					
1978	Neil Putnam	4–7					
1979	Neil Putnam	5–3–2					
1980	Neil Putnam	3–7					
1981	Bill Russo	9–2					8
1982	Bill Russo	7–3					20
1983	Bill Russo	6–5					
1984	Bill Russo	5–5					
1985	Bill Russo	6–5					
Colonial League (1986–1989)
1986	Bill Russo	6–5	2–2	T–2nd			
1987	Bill Russo	4–7	2–3	4th			
1988	Bill Russo	8–2–1	5–0	1st			
1989	Bill Russo	5–5	2–2	T–2nd			
Patriot League (1990–present)
1990	Bill Russo	4–7	1–4	5th			
1991	Bill Russo	6–5	3–2	T–2nd			
1992	Bill Russo	8–3	5–0	1st			
1993	Bill Russo	5–4–2	3–1–1	2nd			
1994	Bill Russo	5–6	5–0	1st			
1995	Bill Russo	4–6–1	3–2	3rd			
1996	Bill Russo	5–5	2–2	4th			
1997	Bill Russo	3–8	2–4	T–4th			
1998	Bill Russo	3–8	3–3	T–3rd			
1999	Bill Russo	4–7	2–4	T–5th			
2000	Frank Tavani	2–9	1–5	T–6th			
2001	Frank Tavani	2–8	1–6	7th			
2002	Frank Tavani	7–5	5–2	3rd			
2003	Frank Tavani	5–6	2–5	6th			
2004	Frank Tavani	8–4	5–1	T–1st	L NCAA Division I-AA First Round		19
2005	Frank Tavani	8–4	5–1	T–1st	L NCAA Division I-AA First Round		21
2006	Frank Tavani	6–6	5–1	T–1st	L NCAA Division I-AA First Round		
2007	Frank Tavani	7–4	4–2	T–2nd			
2008	Frank Tavani	7–4	3–3	4th			
2009	Frank Tavani	8–3	4–2	T–2nd		25	24
2010	Frank Tavani	2–9	1–4	T–5th			
2011	Frank Tavani	4–7	1–4	T–5th			
2012	Frank Tavani	5–6	2–3	T–3rd			
2013	Frank Tavani	5–7	4–1	1st	L NCAA Division I-AA First Round		
2014	Frank Tavani	5–6	2–3	T–3rd			
2015	Frank Tavani	1–10	0–6	7th			
2016	Frank Tavani	2–9	1–5	6th			
2017	John Garrett	3–8	3–3	T–3rd			
2018	John Garrett	3–8	2–4	T–4th			
2019	John Garrett	4–8	4–2	2nd			
2020	John Garrett	2–1	2–1	2nd (South Division)			
2021	John Garrett	3–8	2–4	5th			
2022	John Troxell	4–7	3–3	3rd			
2023	John Troxell	9–3	5–1	1st	L NCAA Division FCS First Round	19	21
2024	John Troxell	6–6	2–4	T–4th			
Total:		706–647–39					
National championship Conference title Conference division title or championship game berth
