= List of Lafayette Leopards head football coaches =

== Key ==
Key to symbols in coaches list
General		Overall		Conference		Postseason (Note: Although the first Rose Bowl Game was played in 1902, it has been continuously played since the 1916 game, and is recognized as the oldest bowl game by the NCAA. "—" indicates any season prior to 1916 when postseason games were not played.)	
No.	Order of coaches (Note: A running total of the number of head coaches, with coaches who served separate tenures being counted only once. Interim head coaches are represented with "Int" and are not counted in the running total. "—" indicates the team played but either without a coach or no coach is on record. "X" indicates an interim year without play.)	GC	Games coached	CW	Conference wins	PW	Postseason wins
DC	Division championships	OW	Overall wins	CL	Conference losses	PL	Postseason losses
CC	Conference championships	OL	Overall losses	CT	Conference ties	PT	Postseason ties
NC	National championships	OT	Overall ties (Note: Overtime rules in college football were introduced in 1996, making ties impossible in the period since.)	C%	Conference winning percentage		
†	Elected to the College Football Hall of Fame	O%	Overall winning percentage (Note: When computing the win–loss percentage, a tie counts as half a win and half a loss.)				

== Head coaches ==
Statistics correct as of the end of the 2025 college football season.

No.	Name	Term	GC	OW	OL	OT	O%	CW	CL	CT	C%	PW	PL	CCs	NCs	Awards
1	Student coaches	1882–1890	69	35	29	4	.544	—	—	—		—	—	—	—	
2	Wallace Moyle	1891–1892	24	7	16	4	.333	—	—	—		—	—	—	—	
2	Pearl T. Haskell & H. H. Vincent	1893	9	3	6	0	.333	—	—	—		—	—	—	—	
3	Hugh Janeway & H. H. Vincent	1894	11	5	6	0	.455	—	—	—		—	—	—	—	
4	Parke H. Davis	1895–1897	42	28	12	2	.690	—	—	—		—	—	—	1	
5	Samuel B. Newton	1898–1901; 1911	42	34	8	0	.810	—	—	—		—	—	—	—	
6	Dave Fultz	1902	11	8	3	0	.727	—	—	—		—	—	—	—	
7	Alfred E. Bull	1903–1907	50	37	10	3	.770	—	—	—		—	—	—	—	
8	George Barclay	1908	10	6	2	2	.700	—	—	—		—	—	—	—	
9	Bob Folwell	1909–1911	22	19	2	1	.886	—	—	—		—	—	—	—	
10	George McCaa	1912–1913	20	8	10	2	.450	—	—	—		—	—	—	—	
11	Wilmer G. Crowell	1914–1916	30	15	12	2	.552	—	—	—		—	—	—	—	
12	Robert Berryman	1917	8	3	5	0	.375	—	—	—		—	—	—	—	
13	Lewis A. Cobbett	1918	7	3	4	0	.429	—	—	—		—	—	—	—	
14	Jock Sutherland^{†}	1919–1923	43	38	8	2	.813	—	—	—		—	—	—	1	
15	Herb McCracken^{†}	1924–1935	105	59	40	6	.590	—	—	—		—	—	—	1	
16	Ernie Nevers^{†}	1938	9	1	8	0	.111	—	—	—		—	—	—	—	
17	Edward Mylin^{†}	1937–1942; 1946	61	36	24	1	.598	—	—	—		—	—	—	—	
18	Ben Wolfson	1943–1946	21	11	9	1	.548	—	—	—		—	—	—	—	
19	Ivy Williamson	1947–1948	18	13	5	0	.722	—	—	—		—	—	—	—	
20	Clipper Smith	1949–1951	25	4	21	0	.160	—	—	—		—	—	—	—	
21	Steve Hokuf	1952–1957	52	25	27	0	.481	—	—	—		—	—	—	—	
22	James McConlogue	1958–1962	45	20	23	2	.467	—	—	—		—	—	—	—	
23	Kenneth Bunn	1963–1966	37	7	28	2	.216	—	—	—		—	—	—	—	
24	Harry Gamble	1967–1970	40	21	19	0	.525	—	—	—		—	—	—	—	
25	Neil Putnam	1971–1980	102	44	55	3	.446	—	—	—		—	—	—	—	
26	Bill Russo	1981–1999	205	103	98	4	.512	41	29	1	.585	—	—	3		
27	Frank Tavani	2000–2016	191	84	107	0	.440	48	55	0	.466	0	4	—	—	
28	John Garrett	2017–2021	48	15	33	0	.313	13	14	0	.481	0	0	—	—	
29	John Troxell	2022–present	47	27	20	0	.574	16	9	0	.640	0	1	1	—	
