= H. H. Vincent =

H. H. Vincent may refer to:

- H. H. Vincent (actor) (1848–1913), British actor
- H. H. Vincent (American football) (1867–1935), American football player and coach
