= 1955 Rutgers Scarlet Knights football team =

American college football season

1955 Rutgers Scarlet Knights football
- Conference: Middle Three Conference
- Record: 3–5 (0–2 Middle Three)
- Head coach: Harvey Harman (14th season)
- Captains: Ed Evans; Robert E. Kelley
- Home stadium: Rutgers Stadium

1955 Middle Three Conference football standings
	Conf.					Overall
Team	W		L		T	W		L		T
Lafayette $	2	–	0	–	0	6	–	2	–	0
Lehigh	1	–	1	–	0	4	–	5	–	0
Rutgers	0	–	2	–	0	3	–	5	–	0
$ – Conference champion

The 1955 Rutgers Scarlet Knights football team represented Rutgers University in the 1955 college football season. In their 14th and final season under head coach Harvey Harman, the Scarlet Knights compiled a 3–5 record and were outscored by their opponents 163 to 95.

== Schedule ==
Date	Opponent	Site	Result	Attendance	Source
September 24	at Princeton*	Palmer Stadium; Princeton, NJ (rivalry)	L 7–41	18,500	
October 8	Muhlenberg*	Rutgers Stadium; Piscataway, NJ	W 21–0	3,500	
October 15	at Brown*	Brown Stadium; Providence, RI	W 14–12	12,000	
October 22	Lehigh	Rutgers Stadium; Piscataway, NJ	L 14–21	11,000	
October 29	Delaware*	Rutgers Stadium; Piscataway, NJ	L 7–33	7,000	
November 5	at Lafayette	Fisher Field; Easton, PA	L 7–16	8,500	
November 12	Penn State*	Rutgers Stadium; Piscataway, NJ	L 13–34	12,000	
November 19	at Columbia*	Baker Field; New York, NY	W 12–6	3,000	
*Non-conference game
