= Lafayette Leopards football =

American football team of Lafayette College

2026 Lafayette Leopards football team
- First season: 1882; 144 years ago
- Head coach: John Troxell; 4th season, 27–20 (.574)
- Location: Easton, Pennsylvania
- Stadium: Fisher Stadium (capacity: 13,132)
- NCAA division: Division I FCS
- Conference: Patriot League
- Colors: Maroon and white
- All-time record: 714–650–39 (.523)

National championships
- Claimed: 1896, 1921, 1926

Conference championships
- Patriot League: 1988, 1992, 1994, 2004, 2005, 2006, 2013, 2023
- Consensus All-Americans: 15
- Rivalries: Lehigh (known as The Rivalry); Bucknell; Penn

Uniforms
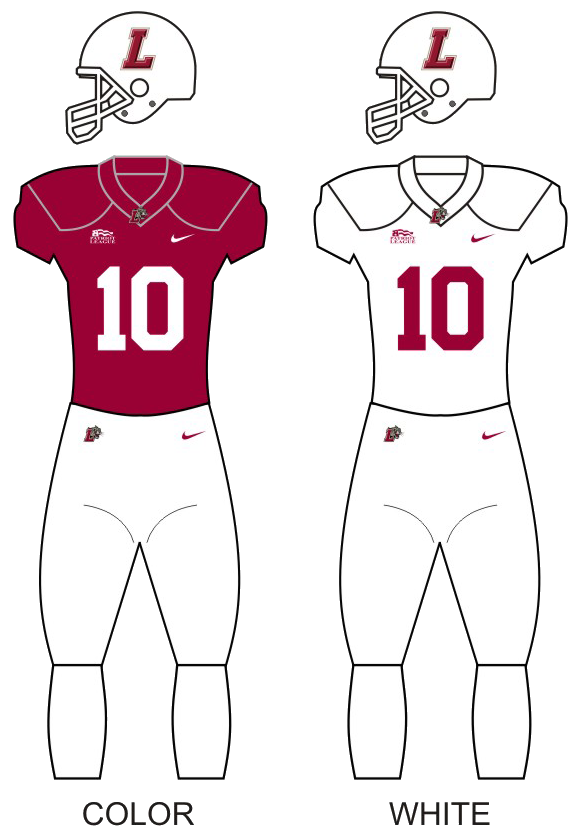
- Fight song: On, Lafayette!
- Mascot: The Leopard
- Marching band: Leopard Pride
- Website: goleopards.com

The Lafayette Leopards football program represents Lafayette College in Easton, Pennsylvania in college football. One of the oldest college football programs in the United States, Lafayette currently plays in the Patriot League at the NCAA Division I Football Championship Subdivision level.

Fielding their first team in 1882, Lafayette has won three college football national championships (1896, 1921, 1926), eight Patriot League championships (1988, 1992, 1994, 2004, 2005, 2006, 2013, 2023), six undefeated seasons (1896, 1909, 1921, 1926, 1937, 1940) and four undefeated, untied seasons (1921, 1926, 1937, 1940).

For most of its history, Lafayette played an independent schedule until joining the Patriot League in 1986. Between 1929 and 1975, the Leopards were a part of an unofficial conference, the "Middle Three Conference," which consisted of Rutgers University and Lehigh University. Today, Lafayette is most noted for its fierce arch-rivalry with Lehigh, which is the most played rivalry in college football (158 games) and the most consecutive years played (since 1897). ESPN considers "The Rivalry" to be among the top ten in college football, and was the subject of a PBS documentary narrated by NFL Films voice and Philadelphia Phillies broadcaster Harry Kalas. Aside from Lehigh, Lafayette's primary rivals are Bucknell University and the University of Pennsylvania.

Lafayette has produced four consensus All-Americans (FBS), 11 FCS All-Americans, four College Football Hall of Fame players, and three College Football Hall of Fame coaches. Lafayette football has produced and nurtured several legendary football personalities, such as George Barclay, inventor of the football helmet, and Jock Sutherland, legendary coach of the Pittsburgh Panthers and Pittsburgh Steelers. Lafayette's Herb McCracken is also credited with inventing the huddle during a game in which Pennsylvania was stealing hand signals.

Lafayette's nickname is the Leopards, dating from October 21, 1924. In its early history, the students, alumni, and press referred to the team as the 'Maroon.' The Leopards are still occasionally referred to as the 'Maroon' or the 'Maroon and White.' Currently, Lafayette has 650 wins, 33rd all-time in Division I.

== History ==
=== Early history (1882–1890) ===
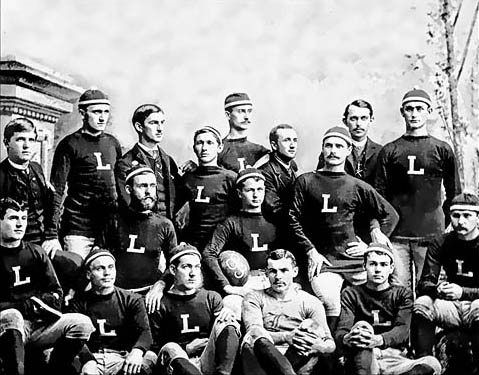
The Lafayette team of 1883

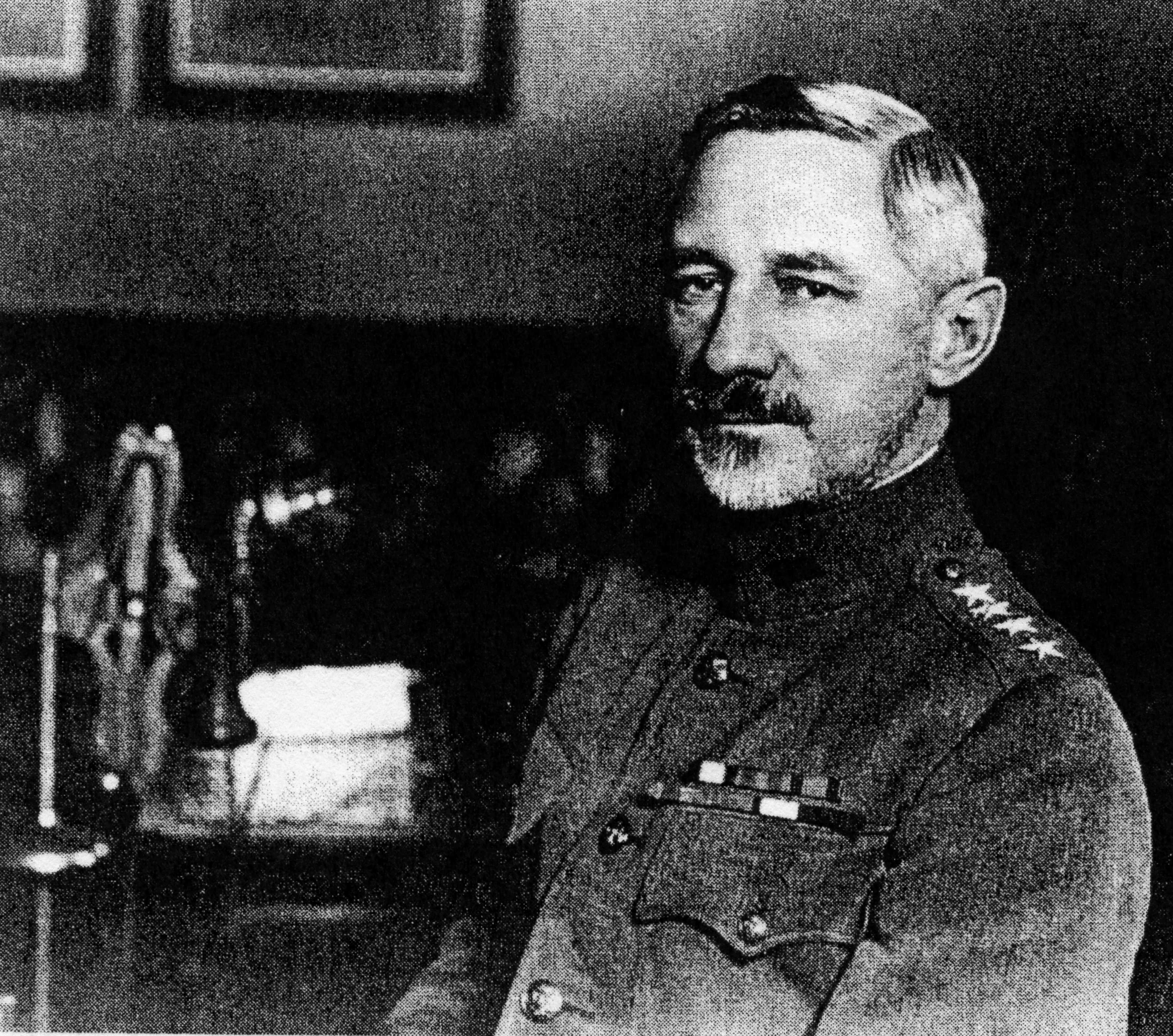
General Peyton C. March, Class of 1884, the U.S. Army Chief of Staff following World War I, was a fullback on Lafayette's first football team; he is the son of Francis A. March, who originated the study of English in academia.

'Rugby' football was first introduced on College Hill in the fall of 1880 by Theodore H. Welles. A member of the class of 1884, Welles brought football to Easton after learning the new game at Wilkes-Barre Academy and Princeton University, where he studied as a college freshman. H.R. Craven, who played and learned the sport at the Lawrenceville School, served as the first team captain.

Early football at Lafayette was not organized. In 1880 and 1881, students competed against each other on campus. However, in the fall of 1882, Lafayette traveled to Rutgers to play its first intercollegiate football contest. On November 7, 1882, Lafayette fell to Rutgers in overtime, 0-0/8-3. One week later, Lafayette lost its second game ever against the University of Pennsylvania 0-0/1-3. Although official records reflect only two games being played in 1882, Welles mentions playing Swarthmore College and the Stevens Institute of Technology on College Hill, winning both contests.

With one season of intercollegiate football experience, Lafayette won its first game ever in 1883. After dropping its first three games to Princeton, Pennsylvania, and Stevens, Lafayette broke through against Rutgers on November 10. With four inches of slushy snow covering the Quad, Lafayette avenged the previous year's defeat 25–0 with four touchdowns despite a water-logged ball.

The first game in 1884 brought a new team to Lafayette's schedule: Lehigh University. Located in nearby Bethlehem, Lehigh would be playing its first football game. With experience and superior skill on its side, Lafayette annihilated Lehigh 56–0 in what would shortly become known as The Rivalry. Due to the proximity of the schools, Lafayette played a Lehigh as their last opponent in 1884, winning 36–0 in Bethlehem. True animosity soon developed between both teams. In 1886, Lafayette was winning 12–0 until a severe downpour halted play 15 minutes into the second half; in 1886, there were two 45 minute halves. Both team captains mutually agreed to end the game even though football tradition called for football to be played in all weather. The game's referee wrote Walter Camp on how to resolve the game. Camp said that the game should be declared a tie, but Lehigh acknowledged they were outplayed and gave Lafayette the victory. Later in the season, with the game scoreless late in the second half, Lehigh was protesting the officiating of the game. As the Lehigh captain pulled his team off the field in protest, Lafayette picked up the ball and scored a touchdown. To this day, Lafayette counts the game as a 4–0 win, while Lehigh considers the game scoreless. The schools would play each other twice per season until 1902.

A bitter rivalry also emerged with Pennsylvania. During their annual contest on the Lafayette Quad on November 6, 1889, Lafayette's right tackle Wells, who had been ejected by the umpire earlier in the contest, tripped a Pennsylvania player running with the ball along the sidelines. As the two players converged following the trip, a crowd of spectators surged the Penn player and "struck, kicked, and generally misused him." Many outside newspapers trumped up the incident to make it seem like a mob had severely beaten the Penn player and there was general unruliness at the Lafayette game. However, since it was the late 19th century, it is possible that the account of the unruly mob was an instance of yellow journalism. Additionally, the umpire who ejected Wells, Dr. Shell, was from the University of Pennsylvania and was cited in the newspaper for making several bad calls against Lafayette, including negating a five-point field goal on a phantom offside. Regardless, Pennsylvania was upset about the altercation relations between the two schools were strained. The incident was a key catalyst in forming the Alumni Advisory Committee in January 1890. Pennsylvania played only two more times at Lafayette, in 1891 and 1893, until 1973.

Although there were no formal conferences, Lafayette, Lehigh, and Pennsylvania were loosely affiliated and their games, two against each opponent, were considered the battle for the Pennsylvania State Championship

=== College football upstart (1891–1918) ===
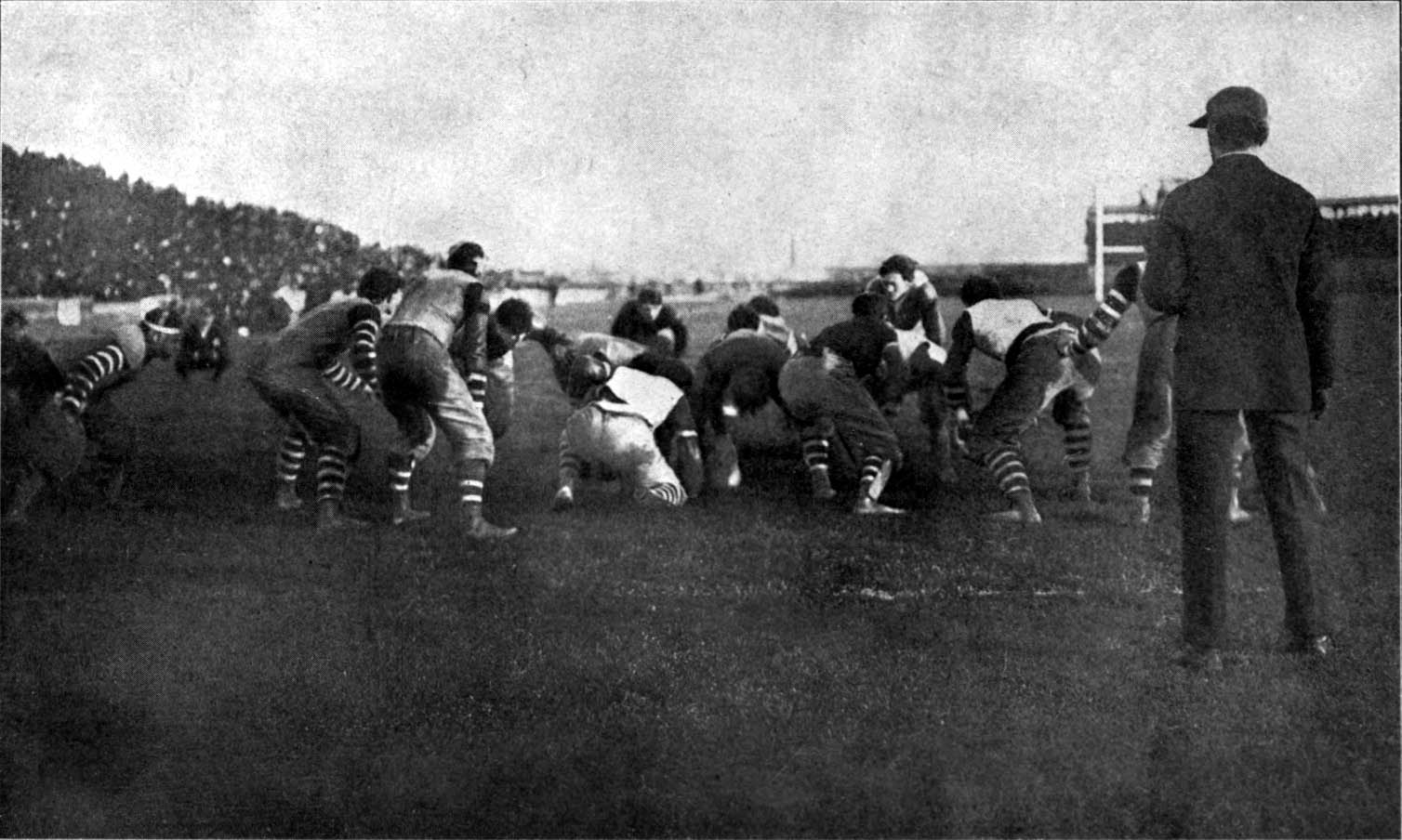
Lafayette holds Penn on defense in the 1896 National Championship game at Franklin Field in Philadelphia on October 24; Lafayette won in a 6–4 upset, representing the only loss for Penn in a 66-game stretch. Two Lafayette players are wearing the first football helmet; one is the helmet's inventor, George "Rose" Barclay

After being managed by students, Lafayette hired its first paid football coach for the 1891 season, W.S. Moyle. Moyle was hired from Yale University since he was familiar with the Yale system and was considered a good player. His stipend was $400. As coach from 1891 to 1892, Moyle played in nearly every game and carried the ball on nearly every down. He was lauded as a football hero until the faculty disapproved of his playing. However, he was regarded as 'good coach' who 'taught for the first time what teamwork was.'

Despite hiring coaches, Lafayette's record had a losing record each season. Between 1891 and 1894, Lafayette went 2–9 against Lehigh, including two losses and a neutral site loss before 3,000 spectators in Wilkes-Barre in 1891.

In 1895, the alumni athletic advisors hired who would become a legendary college football figure, Parke H. Davis. Writing a history of Lafayette Athletics in 1926, Francis A. March, Jr. said, "With the advent of Davis, little Lafayette stepped from comparative obscurity to a level with the football giants." Davis, who played at Princeton, was the first coach hired based on experience, having coached Amherst College and the University of Wisconsin in previous seasons. Lafayette went 6–2 and had its first winning season since 1888 swept Lehigh for the first time since 1886. Davis is credited with bringing organization, recognition, and enthusiasm to Lafayette football through his charismatic personality and writing college fight songs. In 1896, Lafayette won its first National Championship, which featured a dramatic 6–4 win against Pennsylvania at Franklin Field.

Davis coached one more season, a 9–2–1 campaign in 1897. Samuel B. Newton, who arrived after coaching Penn State led Lafayette to its most victories ever with a 12–1 record in 1899, with a lone 12–0 defeat to national champions Princeton (12–1) and outscoring opponents 253–23. Newton was 7–0 against Lehigh and 33–14 overall through his last season of 1902 before leaving Lafayette to coach Lehigh. In four games against Lafayette, Newton only won twice while going 23–20–2 overall. During this time, Newton coached Walter E. Bachman, who developed the roving center concept in football. Bachman was named second-team All-American by Walter Camp in 1900 and 1901, one of the first players outside of the 'Big Four' to earn the honor.

The legendary roll of Lafayette coaches continued after the departure of Newton. Dr. Alfred E. Bull coached between 1903 and 1907, compiling a 37–10–3 record in five seasons, with one loss to Lehigh. Tragically, Lafayette football hero and helmet inventor George "Rose" Barclay, who became coach in 1908 and was the first Lafayette player to coach the team, died following after one season after suffering from an appendicitis. His successor, Bob Folwell, became one of the most decorated coaches in Lafayette history by posting a 19–2–1 record. Folwell led the University of Iowa to its first conference championship and after Lafayette, led Washington & Jefferson College to be recognized as 'an elite power team,' along with Notre Dame, Michigan, the University of Chicago, and Yale. In 1925, he became the first coach of the New York Giants.

Folwell coached Lafayette to its first win against Princeton on October 23, 1909, in what The New York Times said was, "the most sensational finish that has ever been seen in a football game." With six second remaining and the score 0–0, Princeton was set to attempt a game-winning field goal from the Lafayette 10-yard line. Irmschler blitzed through the tackle and guard, caught the ball as it left the kicker's foot, and raced 92 yards for the win as time expired for a 6–0 win. The team was greeted with a jubilant crowd that paraded through Easton and College Hill when the team returned. In their next game two weeks later, Lafayette tied Pennsylvania 6–6 and ultimately finished second behind Yale (10–0–0) in the East and for the national championship. Lafayette outscored the opposition 176–6.

Folwell left in the middle of the 1911 season with Lafayette holding a 5–0 record. It came at an inopportune moment as Lafayette was set to host the Carlisle Indians and Jim Thorpe. Lafayette lost 19–0 and went 2–3 the rest of the season under S.B. Newton.

=== National college football power (1919–1948) ===
Between 1921 and 1948, Lafayette was considered one of the premiere college football programs. The team earned two national championships, had four undefeated seasons, featured several All-Americans, played in major games, and was involved in several bowl scenarios. During nearly every season of the era, the team was led by a coach that would later be inducted into the College Football Hall of Fame.

==== The 1920s ====
The hiring of Jock Sutherland in 1919 started Lafayette on the road to national prominence during the 1920s. After coaching an undefeated team at an Army base in Georgia during World War I and only a few years removed from playing for the University of Pittsburgh and Pop Warner, Sutherland was prepared to enter a career in dentistry. However, a chance meeting with a friend propelled Sutherland to take a coaching job at Lafayette.

Lafayette finished 1919 at 6–2 and 5–3 the following season. According to Sutherland, with virtually the same team as 1920, Lafayette went 9–0 in 1921 and went on a 17-game winning streak that stretched between 1920 and 1922, where Lafayette outscored opponents 495–47, with wins over major teams such as Penn, coached by John Heisman, Pittsburgh (twice), Fordham University, and Boston College. During the national championship season of 1921, no team came within three touchdowns of Lafayette except Pittsburgh, coached by Pop Warner. Late in the game, Lafayette used a triple pass and touchdown by 'Bots' Brunner near the Pitt goal line to gain a 6–0 lead. Pitt was inside the Lafayette ten with under two minutes to play, but an illegal substitution by Pitt cost the Panthers dearly and Lafayette held on for the win.

Six games into the 1922 season, Lafayette was poised to claim another national championship. The Maroon defeated the University of Pittsburgh at Forbes Field in the only loss of the season for a 10–1 team that claimed a post-season victory at Stanford. Facing the 1922 Rose Bowl participant Washington & Jefferson before 38,000 at the Polo Grounds in New York City, Lafayette took a commanding 13–0 halftime lead. However, a dramatic and miraculous comeback by the Presidents resulted in a 14–13 Maroon defeat, one of the most bitter in Lafayette football history.

Sutherland coached the Maroon until 1923, when he returned to Pitt, his alma mater, for the 1924 season. New coach Herb McCracken, also a recent player under Pop Warner, quickly proved himself by defeating Sutherland at Pittsburgh 10–0 in the second game of the season. McCracken won his first five games before falling to Pennsylvania 6–3. Before the game, McCracken discovered that Penn had decoded Lafayette's play-calling signals. McCracken responded with a new and innovative solution: the huddle. Although McCracken is often credited as the inventor of the huddle, there are earlier, though some less substantiated claims of other schools implementing the huddle only a few years earlier.

At the start of the 1926 season, Lafayette inaugurated its new, unfinished 18,000-seat stadium with a 35–0 win over Muhlenberg. The Maroon continued to win by dominate scores en route to their third national championship on the back of All-American halfback Mike "George" Wilson, who led the nation in scoring with 120 points and 20 touchdowns, a national record at the time. The Maroon also led the East in scoring, with 328 points, and only surrendered 37 points in nine games. Halfback and team captain Frank Kirkleski, who later starred for the NFL's Pottsville Maroons, also received All-American praise played in the East-West Shrine Game in San Francisco.

Lafayette continued to dominate opponents in the late 1920s, but would win only a few games against major teams, such as Penn State. In 1929, Lafayette joined with Lehigh and Rutgers to form the Middle Three Conference, which consisted of round-robin games between the two teams. The schools split the first year of the series at 1–1–0 each. Lafayette won their first Middle Three title the following season.

==== The 1930s ====
Lafayette made college football history on October 25, 1930, when the Leopards and Washington & Jefferson played the first night indoor college football game in history at the Atlantic City Boardwalk Hall before 25,000. The Presidents won 7–0 on an easy touchdown within the two-yard line with the help of a play that is illegal today—a recovered "fumble" by pushing a Lafayette defender into the kicker and the ball. In their final game of the season, Lafayette defeated Lehigh 16–6 before 20,000 at Fisher Field, the largest crowd to witness "The Rivalry" at the time.

After a 7–2 season in 1931, Lafayette's record began to decline. Coach Herb McCracken had only won less than five games once since his first season in 1924, but did not win more than three games through his final season at Lafayette in 1935. Although he was only 36 at the time, McCracken retired from coaching to help friend Maurice Robinson start-up Scholastic Publications and write a popular magazine, Scholastic Coach.

To return the Leopards to the spotlight, Lafayette called on Ernie Nevers, an assistant coach at Stanford University who helped lead the Indians to three straight Rose Bowl games. Nevers, along with Jim Thorpe, was considered one of the two best college football players ever and had a legendary career in the early NFL. Hope was high on College Hill as the 1935 freshman team went undefeated against the leading freshmen teams of the East, including Princeton. However, with a young team plagued by injuries, the Leopards went 1–8, their worst record since their first season of football in 1882, and were blown out in their last five games. Despite stating he would stay for the 1937 season, Nevers resigned to become an assistant coach at the University of Iowa.

Absent a coach for the second straight season, Lafayette turned to Edward "Hook" Mylin, the inaugural Orange Bowl winning head coach of Bucknell University. In one of the most remarkable turnarounds in college football at the time, the 1–8 Leopards of 1936 went 8–0 in 1937. Furthermore, the Leopards posted seven shutouts, outscored opponents 130–6, and featured an unscored upon defense, including a 13–0 win over heavily favored New York University at Yankee Stadium. The key win featured a key 79-yard punt by quarterback Tommy Kearns and a 50-yard and 30-yard touchdown pass. Media sources such as "The Lafayette" student newspaper began referring to the 1937 team as the "Mylin Miracle Men" since the victory left Lafayette as the only undefeated, untied, and unscored upon team in the East. Two games later, Lafayette surrendered their only touchdown of the season against Rutgers. Early in the game, Rutgers defender Bill Tranavitch, who was the leading scorer in the nation at the time, returned an 87-yard interception for a touchdown. The victory elicited the first football parade in downtown Easton in 12 years as boisterous students clogged trolley and car traffic. Lafayette concluded their perfect season with a 6–0 win over Lehigh, their first victory over the Engineers since 1933. There was speculation that Lafayette would receive an Orange Bowl bid for the January 1, 1938 game. Sources at New York newspapers told the student newspaper that Lafayette was at the top of the list of the Bowl Committee as 'feelers' were sent to inquire about schools' interest. Associated Press news releases at the end of the season also listed Lafayette at the top of a list that included Colorado, Fordham, Holy Cross, Villanova, Detroit, and Nebraska. However, the administration did not want to interfere with academic activity and a trustee doubted permission would be granted to play in Miami. Michigan State University was ultimately selected from the East.

Mylin continued with a strong team in 1938, posting a 5–3 record and a 7–0 win at Penn State. Lafayette defeated Lehigh in 1938 and again in 1939. Following the 1939 season, Leopard captain John Quigg was invited to play in the Eastern Collegiate All-Star Game against the New York Giants, but the invitation arrived after the game was played.

==== The 1940s ====
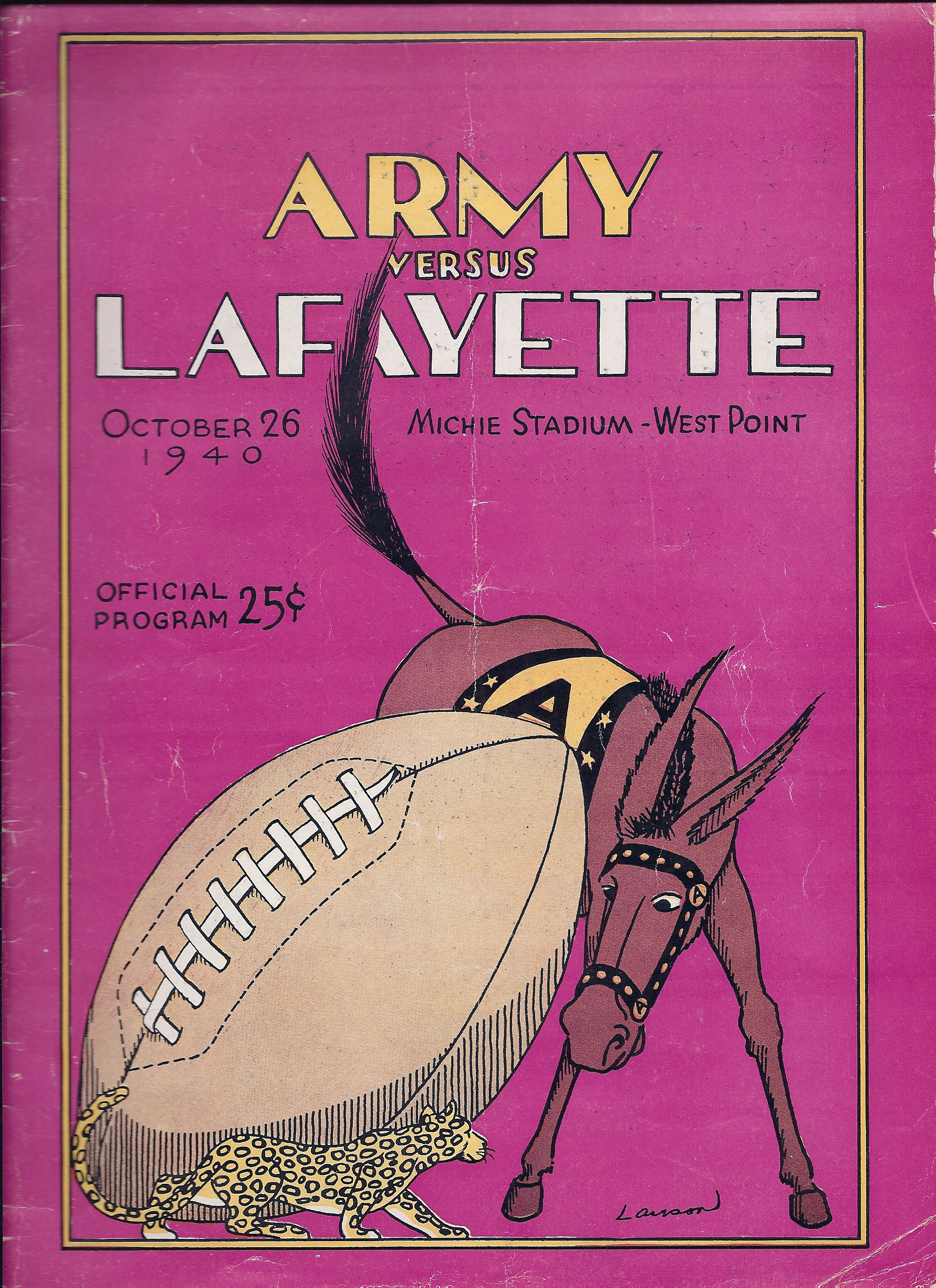
Lafayette upset Army 19–0 at West Point and was compared to Notre Dame the following week en route to an undefeated season. It is Lafayette's only win against Army.

Mylin led Lafayette to its second undefeated season in four years with the help of a physical team and the triumvirate of Walt Zirinsky, Sammy Moyer, and James Farrell. With a narrow 9–7 win over New York University in their second game and missing several injured players, Lafayette carried a 4–0 record into their meeting with Army at West Point. The team was suddenly awakened at 4 a.m. as the Cadets, cavalrymen, and horses paraded in front of the team hotel in an attempt to rattle the Leopards. It was also an important date at West Point since a visiting delegation of South American generals would be reviewing the cadets before the game. Army advanced deep into Lafayette territory early in the first quarter, but a missed field goal and key stops kept the Leopards in the game. Zirinsky scored in the third for a 6–0 lead, a spread formation newly unveiled by Mylin helped Lafayette to a 12–0 lead. A 70-yard interception return by Zirinsky in the final minute sealed Lafayette's 19–0 win. Despite injuries and facing many Army substitutes, Lafayette outgained Army 184–104. The following week, Army fell to Notre Dame 7–0 on a returned interception, leading many writers to compare Lafayette to Notre Dame. As of 2011, the 1940 victory over Army is Lafayette's only victory in 20 meetings.

Two weeks later, Lafayette edged Rutgers University by an extra point 7–6 in New Brunswick before 20,000. At 8–0, Lafayette demolished Lehigh 46–0. Zirinsky scored three touchdowns as Lafayette gained 585 total yards, a record at the time in "The Rivalry." Lafayette finished 1940 with 238 points, third in the nation behind Boston College and leader Tennessee. Lafayette was once again considered for the Orange Bowl as 'feelers' from the Committee approached Lafayette. Despite being in the final three from the East, the Committee selected Georgetown University. Ironically, the Administration elected to participate in the Bowl, with President Lewis going as far as throwing out an orange to open a post-season student pep rally. The Sun Bowl expressed interest in Lafayette, but the Administration declined. Farrell and Moyer received AP All-American honorable mention status as Lafayette achieved its only Associated Press Poll ranking: 19.

The following year, Zirinsky scored two touchdowns to finish his career with 55 points against Lehigh, the most of any player in "The Rivalry." Coupled with the 1939 game, Zirinsky outscored the entire Lehigh team 55–20 during the three-year span. Drafted by the Cleveland Rams in 1942, Zirinsky played in only the 1945 season.

World War II soon impacted the Leopard football as many players and coaches became enlisted men, including Mylin. Lafayette went 3–5–1 in 1942, including a 19–13 win over the University of Virginia at Fisher Field and coming up one-yard short against Lehigh in the final seconds of a 7–7 tie. In 1943 and 1944, Lafayette continued to play football as other colleges suspended their programs such as nearby Moravian College, the former team of new Leopard coach Ben Wolfson. Unlike Harvard and Yale, Lafayette and Lehigh continued their rivalry, playing each other twice, as well as Rutgers twice and one game against nearby Willow Grove Naval Air Station. Only 5,000 attended the game in Easton, and 3,500 in Taylor Stadium, both Lafayette routs and devoid of bands or cheerleaders. In 1944, Lafayette expanded their schedule to include 'local' trips to Syracuse University and NYU, as well as two games against Rutgers and Lehigh. Only 300 fans attended the first game against Lehigh in a rainstorm. Lafayette romped in the finale 64–0, their largest margin of victory in the series, to finish 6–1.

Between 1945 and 1946, Lafayette won three games, including two shutouts over Lehigh. Mylin returned for the 1946 season, his last, and finished his Lafayette career with a 6–0–1 mark against Lehigh.

Ivan Williamson replaced Mylin in 1947 and went 6–3 in his first season, including a 14–7 win over Syracuse and the fifth straight shutout of Lehigh.

==== "The Greatest Game They Never Played"—the 1949 Sun Bowl incident ====
Following a 7–2 mark in 1948 and a 23–13 win against Lehigh before 21,000 at Fisher Field, Lafayette received an invitation to play UTEP (Texas College of Mines) in the 1949 Sun Bowl. Lafayette accepted the bid contingent upon being able to bring David Showell, an African-American halfback and former Tuskegee Airman. Texas law at the time prohibited African-Americans from playing on the same field as Caucasian players in a state-supported stadium. Showell's team members also did not want to accept the bid unless Showell could accompany the team to El Paso. The Chairman of the Sun Bowl, C.D. Belding, rejected the provision and Lafayette declined the bid. The Athletic Department did not issue a reason for the rejection, prompting a protest of 1,500 students and a bonfire. The students marched on the President's house, demanding an explanation. President Ralph Cooper Hutchison explained the situation and along with student leaders, phoned the Bowl Committee chairman to reconsider. Upon a prompt rejection by Belding, the student protest marched downtown and received an audience at the local radio station. The station and the students sent a telegram to President Truman condemning racial intolerance and segregation with a terse, "Denied Sun Bowl bid with Negro on team. Is that Democracy?"

The protest and received national media attention in the New York Times and AP wires. The incident was also basis of a popular song, "The Greatest Game they Never Played." The situation was also significant in that it drew attention to segregation and discrimination against African-American players in bowl games and college football.

=== The 30-year 'Slump' (1949–1980) ===
After a string of successful decades, Lafayette football receded from the national stage and was defined more by its Middle Three Conference duels with Lehigh University and Rutgers University. Lafayette gradually de-emphasized football with the inauguration of alumnus Ralph Cooper Hutchinson as president of the college. At Washington & Jefferson College, where he had been president from 1931 to 1945, Hutchinson had presided over the de-emphasis of the Presidents national profile in light of improper payments to players. Additionally, with the rise of state universities through the influx of returning servicemen and state funding, Lafayette and other small private schools were at a competitive disadvantage in financial support and recruiting. During this era, Lafayette defeated Lehigh only eight times out of 31 games and Rutgers only three times through the cessation of the rivalry in 1975.

Following the departure of Ivy Williamson to the University of Wisconsin, Clipper Smith, who lost only two games as the coach of Villanova, only won four games between 1949 and 1951. However, he led the 1–6 Leopards to a 21–12 win over a 6–2 Lehigh team in 1949. Lafayette was losing 12–0 at halftime before a ferocious comeback gave the Leopards their seventh straight win over Lehigh and as of 2011, is the largest upset (record-wise) by the Leopards in the series to date. Lehigh rebounded the next year for their first win since 1936 and go undefeated for the first time in their history.

Steve Hokuf took over as head coach in 1952 and led the Leopards to their first winless season since the program's first year in 1882. However, Lafayette rebounded and won three straight games against Lehigh through 1955, their last three-game winning streak until 2004–2006. The 1955 season was also one of the best of the era as the 6–2 Leopards scored two upset wins. Traveling to Dartmouth College as a 13-point underdog, Lafayette scored a 21–13 win for their first win over an Ivy League team since a 1923 win over Penn. Several weeks later, Lafayette defeated Rutgers 16–7 and Lehigh in the last week of the season to capture their last outright Middle Three Conference championship. Lafayette won six games in 1956 and would not win as many games until going 7–2 in 1968.

Lafayette and Lehigh made college football history in 1964. Both schools met in Easton for the 100th edition of "The Rivalry" before a sold-out crowd and national media attention. Ironically, it was one of the worst-ever match-ups of the Rivalry as Lafayette was winless and Lehigh had one win. The game fared no better as the schools played to a 6–6 tie, and both schools missed an extra point.

Lafayette soon hired Harry Gamble, who would achieve later prominence as a coach at Penn and president of the Philadelphia Eagles. Gamble was the only coach between Edward "Hook" Mylin and Bill Russo to have a winning record as coach of the Leopards. In his second season in 1968, Gamble led Lafayette to their best record since 1948 with a 7–3 mark. The team had a three and four-game winning streak and was ranked first in the Lambert Cup poll as the best team in the east, but was upset at home by a two-win Lehigh team, 21–16. Wide receiver Mike Miller was named to the honorable mention 'Little' All-American team, the first time since 1940 any Lafayette player was mentioned on an All-American list. Gamble also went 2–2 against Lehigh, the best record of any coach from the era.

The end of the Gamble era in the early 1970s saw the emergence of running back Tony Giglio, who would become one of the most prolific rushers in Lafayette history. Giglio amassed 2,519 yards and 22 touchdowns in only three seasons, including a 238-yard outburst in a 19-point loss at Colgate. Giglio was named third-team All-America by the Associated Press in 1973, the first Leopard team placement since legendary rusher Mike "George" Wilson in 1926.

Lafayette continued to struggle on the field, never winning more than five games until 1981. In 1971, the Leopards scored an upset win over Penn in Gamble's first season as the Quakers' coach. The 17–15 at Franklin Field was the first Lafayette win over Penn since 1923. The season also featured the Leopards last-ever win (as of 2011) over Rutgers.

Despite mediocre records of three and five win seasons, the Lafayette student newspaper editorialized in 1975 that the program was in a 25-year demise between 1949 and 1975 and was being dominated by teams which the paper considered football 'powers.' Between 1960 and 1974, Lafayette went 10–56–1 against Bucknell, Colgate, Delaware, Lehigh, Penn, and Rutgers. Citing poor morale on campus and the administration's unwillingness to commit to improving the program and attributing losing to a 'temporary down cycle', the paper editorialized, "Let's get rid of Colgate and yes, even Lehigh. Both schools have moved onto higher football plateaus... the Engineers are actively seeking greater things for their program, while Lafayette only seems to be striving for mediocrity." The rivalry with Rutgers ended that season as the Leopards were blown out in their last three meetings.

Lafayette managed a 21–17 upset of Lehigh in 1976, but finished no better than .500 or defeated Lehigh through the remainder of Neil Putman's tenure in 1980.

=== Resurgence and Rebirth under Russo (1981–1996) ===
With the hiring of Bill Russo, Lafayette football turned the program around through increased offensive output. Through Russo's first 16 seasons, the Leopards finished below .500 only three times. In the preceding 30 years, the Leopards only had ten winning seasons and won more than six games five times.

Russo quickly asserted his new style by winning the first five games of the season, a first since 1956, and entered the season finale against Lehigh with an identical 8–2 record. Despite being huge underdogs against the Lambert Cup leading Engineers, the Leopards relied upon their defense to spring a 10–3 upset at Taylor Stadium. Even though Lafayette finished with one more win than Lehigh and played a near identical schedule, Lafayette was denied a bid to the Division I-AA playoffs and finished fourth in the Lambert Cup poll. As of 2012, the 1981 game, along with 2004, is the highest combined win total for each school entering the season finale.

Success continued under Russo as the Leopards defeated Lehigh for a second straight year and won seven games. The era also saw the inaugural season of the Colonial League in 1986, which later became known as the Patriot League.

After beating Lehigh in 1984 and 1986, the Leopards finally won their first Colonial League championship in 1988 with an 8–2–1 mark. In the second game of 1988, Lafayette scored a monumental 28–20 upset over Holy Cross. The previous season, Holy Cross finished 11–0 and No. 1 in the final 1987 NCAA Division I-AA poll and its best player Gordie Lockbaum, finished third in the Heisman Trophy voting. With another win in 1992, Lafayette was the only Patriot League team to defeat Holy Cross between its dominant run against Eastern football between 1986 and 1993.

The 1988 season was one of the best in Lafayette history and witnessed the emergence of its best quarterback ever, Frank Baur. Baur smashed and rewrote nearly every Lafayette offensive and passing record with a cannon arm. In the 1988 season, he led the nation in passing efficiency at 64% and led the Leopards to finish as the second-ranked offense. He finished his career with 8,399 yards and 62 touchdowns, which stood until 2003.

Baur also achieved fame by being the only Lafayette and Patriot League athlete, as well as one of only a few non-BCS collegiate athletes, to appear on the cover of Sports Illustrated. He appeared on the cover of the September 4, 1989 college football preview and was projected to be one of the first three quarterbacks taken in the 1990 NFL Draft, along with Troy Aikman and Steve Walsh. After being selected the Hula Bowl following his senior season, Baur was drafted but later cut by the New York Giants.

The 1988 team also featured Lafayette's record-breaking running back and wide receiver up to that time. As a freshman, Tom Costello ran for 1132 yards and later grabbed the record from Giglio with 1,397 yards in 1989. Phillip Ng served as Baur's primary target and raked in 13 touchdowns and 1,048 yards. His touchdown mark still stands as the most in Leopards history and was the first Leopard to catch over 1,000 yards in a season.

With the Colonial League championship up for grabs, the 1988 Lafayette–Lehigh meeting surpassed all hype. Lafayette rolled to a 52–45 win in an explosive game, where both teams passed for over 300 yards by halftime and broke many Rivalry records that still stand today.

Russo was also acknowledged following the 1988 season by winning the Eddie Robinson Coach of the Year award, which is presented to the best coach in Division I-AA.

Lafayette won the Patriot League championship for the second time in 1992 and was the only school aside from Holy Cross to win the league championship at the time. At 8–3, Lafayette finished the season on a six-game winning streak and lost two games each by three points. During the season, Erik Marsh burst onto the scene and became the most prolific rusher in Lafayette football history. He rushed for 1,365 yards as a sophomore to set the record, only to break his own mark with 1,441 the next season. The record still stands today and is one of the highest single season totals in Patriot League history. During the 1992 season, Tom Kirchoff also established records as one of the most efficient quarterbacks in Lafayette history. Ranking only second to Baur at the time, Kirchoff threw for 26 touchdowns and nine interceptions, the best spread ever in a single season. His 26 touchdowns stood as a Lafayette record until 2009.

Despite the loss of Kirchoff to graduation, Lafayette's offense continued to excel with Marsh through 1994. The running back essentially had a player's average career season against Lehigh alone, rushing for over 800 yards in four games against the Engineers, including 251 yards in 1992 and 249 yards in 1993.

The 1994 season was arguably one of the most bizarre yet triumphant season's in Lafayette football history despite finishing with a 5–6 record. After losing their first six games of the season, including five losses by more than two touchdowns, the Leopards went on to win their last five games of the season to capture their third Patriot League championship. In their five wins, Lafayette allowed only more than two touchdowns once, with the only exception being a 56–20 drubbing of Lehigh.

=== The "Study" Years (1997–1999) ===
Despite decades of rich tradition, Lafayette nearly dropped its football program from Division I to Division III or outright canceled the program. As early as 1996, athletics director Eve Atkinson made proposals to de-emphasize portions of the department. Poor overall performance, interdepartmental budget conflicts, and issues with coach-recommended athletes competing in the admissions pool were factors cited for all athletics programs as a reason for downgrading to Division III. Several faculty argued that football should be eliminated to achieve budget savings and that the sport should not be a focus of the student body. The trustees ultimately voted to remain Division I and continue football.

Considerable damage was done to the program during the period. Prospective recruits would not consider Lafayette based upon rumor of a downgrade or elimination of football, and current players transferred. Russo's teams, which had only four losing seasons in his first 15 years and did not win less than four games once, went a combined 10–23 in the next three seasons. Miraculously, Russo's teams contested Lehigh closely during the era, including a two-point loss to an undefeated Lehigh squad in his final game in 1999.

=== Frank Tavani era (2000–2016) ===
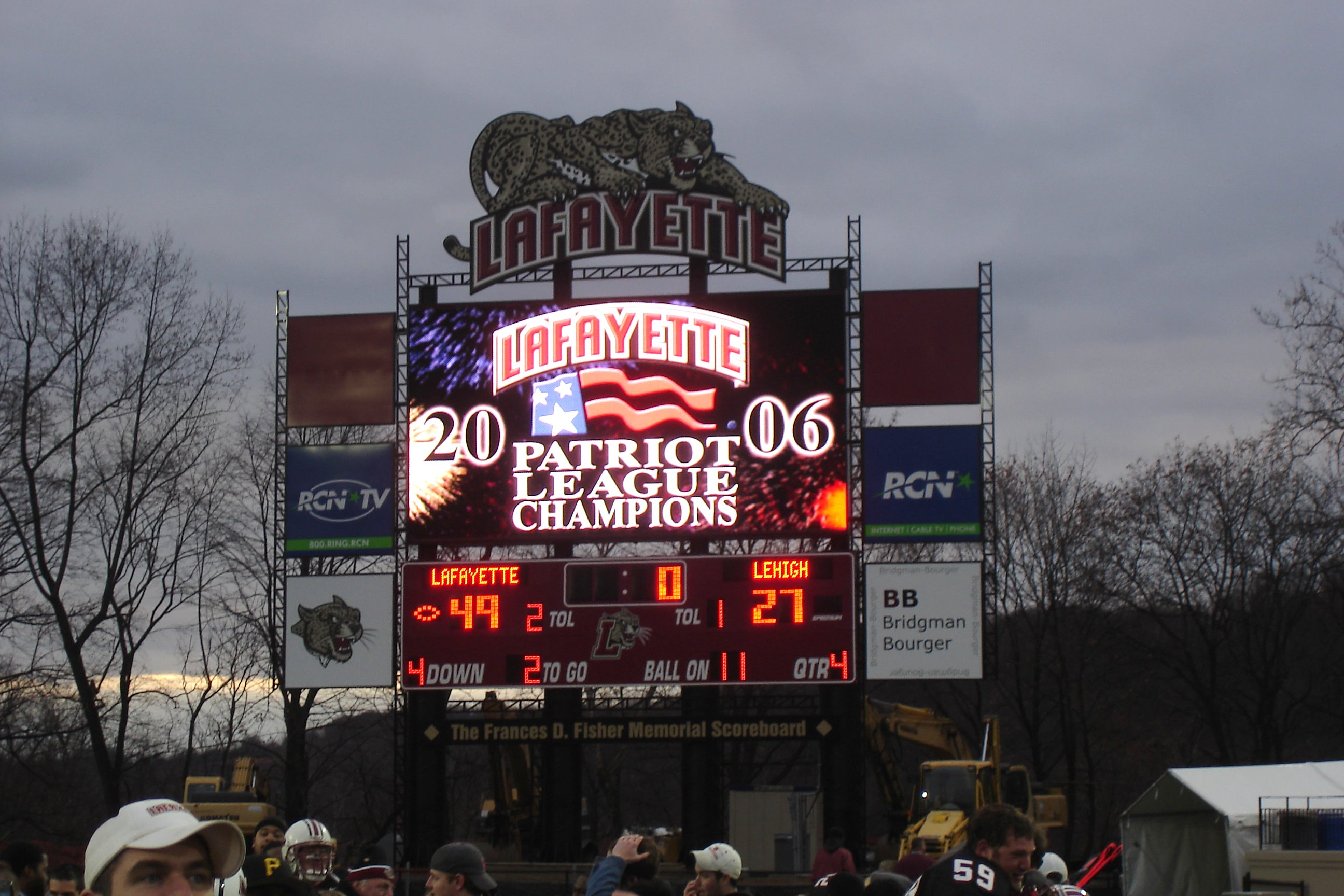
Fisher Stadium's scoreboard following Lafayette's victory over Lehigh University in the 142nd edition of "The Rivalry" in 2006. The series between the two colleges, which are 17 miles (27 km) away from each other in the Lehigh Valley, is the most-played rivalry in college football history with 158 meetings since 1884.

Frank Tavani was named head coach following the retirement of Russo in December 1999. Tavani had been a coach on Russo's staff since 1986 and was most recently the associate head coach. Challenges confronted the program at every angle: the recent study to disband or de-emphasize the program had left Lafayette in a disadvantaged position on the recruiting trail. Also, the success of Lehigh reaching double-digit wins and playoff berths each season since 1998, coupled with aged facilities, placed Lafayette in the shadow of its regional rival. However, Tavani's vision helped revitalize the program within five seasons and led to three consecutive championships and playoff appearances, nine winning seasons, national rankings, and a string of four consecutive victories over Lehigh.

The tide began to turn with the arrival of quarterback Marko Glavic in Tavani's first season. The Canadian native was initially recruited to Bowling Green University, but offensive coordinator Mike Faragalli's move to Lafayette prompted Bowling Green to rescind Glavic's scholarship offer. Glavic, who won the Patriot League rookie of the year by throwing for 1,964 yards and 12 touchdowns, surpassed many of Baur's records and finished as Lafayette's all-time leading quarterback with 9,819 yards and tied Baur with 62 touchdowns. Glavic was the all-time Patriot League passing leader until Dominic Randolph of Holy Cross surpassed the mark in 2008.

Lafayette continued to score recruiting gains with the arrival of running back Joe McCourt, the 2000 Philadelphia Inquirer player of the year. Several key linemen were also recruited in 2001, and success continued in 2002 with many key defensive players that built Lafayette's title run, such as All-American linebacker Maurice Bennett and future NFL player Blake Costanzo.

Lafayette won two games each in Tavani's first two seasons, but the Leopards surpassed all expectations in 2002 by going 7–5, tying for second place, and upsetting Lehigh 14–7. The Mountain Hawks entered the season ranked as the nation's number one team and had beaten Lafayette for seven straight seasons. With the score tied 7–7 in the fourth quarter, the Leopards engineered "The Drive," a 19-play, nine-minute drive that resulted in Joe McCourt's winning touchdown dive. However, "The Drive's" biggest play occurred on a fake field goal attempt. Lafayette was set to kick a 58-yard field goal, but holder Mike O'Connor changed the play and scurried eight yards for a first down to keep the march alive.

Expectations were high in 2003, but Lafayette went 5–6. However, Glavic and McCourt contributed record-breaking efforts. Glavic threw for a record 2,725 yards, while McCourt ran for 1,393 yards, the third most behind Marsh and Costello, and 15 touchdowns, the most since Nick Kowigos in 1982.

Despite losing Glavic to graduation, many key players returned to the Leopards in 2004 and led Lafayette to its first-ever postseason appearance and first Patriot League Championship since 1994. The Leopards signaled their championship form with an upset 21–16 win over scholarship University of Richmond and a game saving tackle inside the one-yard line in a 14–13 win at Bucknell. Quarterback Brad Maurer emerged as a dual run-and-pass threat for the Leopards by throwing and rushing for over 100 yards at Fordham, Tavani's first win over the Rams. Lafayette entered their game as underdogs to Lehigh, ranked number eight in the polls, but the dual-threat ability of Maurer, McCourt's 23 carries, and a punishing defensive effort, propelled the Leopards to a 24–10 win. The Leopards fell the following week to the University of Delaware when a game-tying touchdown drive was intercepted and returned for a score, but ended the season ranked 19 in two polls. It was Lafayette's first ranking since the 1997 preseason. McCourt finished the season with 16 touchdowns, tying Tom Costello in 1989 as second most behind Mike "George" Wilson's 20 scores in 1926. McCourt also finished his career second to Marsh with 4,474 yards and the 50 touchdowns, the most at Lafayette. He also finished with the fifth most career receptions ever, 139, and ranks 11th in career receiving yards.

Success continued into 2005 as Maurer and a stingy defense led the Leopards to a second consecutive Patriot League Championship season, playoff berth, and 8–4 record. The Leopards entered their final game of the season at 12th ranked Lehigh needing a win to tie for the Patriot League championship and keep their slim playoff hopes alive. On the first drive, Maurer was injured and replaced by back-up quarterback Pat Davis. Though up 10–3 at halftime, Lafayette was down 19–17 in the fourth quarter. With 38 seconds remaining and Lafayette facing its potential last play, Davis chucked a 37-yard touchdown strike to running back Jonathan Hurt, who managed to sneak behind the last defender at the five for the reception and skipped into the end-zone for the winning 23–19 score. The play, known as "The Big Hurt," is one of the most famous plays in the storied "Rivalry". Future NFL San Francisco 49er Blake Costanzo terrorized Lehigh with three sacks. Following the win, Lafayette was awarded an at-large berth into the NCAA playoffs, assisted by its 7–0 win over Richmond, a top 15 team, earlier in the season. Though Lafayette fell to Appalachian State, the eventual national champions, after being tied 20–20 entering the fourth quarter, the Leopards ended the season ranked in the top 25.

Lafayette earned its third consecutive trip to the NCAA Division I FCS Playoffs by clinching its third straight Patriot League Championship in 2006. The championship run was second to only 1994 in terms of improbability. After being ranked as high as 22 in week two, Lafayette lost its next five games. At 2–5, the Leopards earned a momentum-changing win at Colgate, Tavani's first over. Lafayette won its next three games, including what is known as the "Shock and Awe" game over Lehigh. Lafayette scored 28 points in eight minutes during the first half and led 28–21 at halftime. Lehigh cut the score to 28–27, but Lafayette scored 21 unanswered points in compiling 500 yards of offense. Maurer and Hurt were named game co-MVPs, one of only two occasions that the award was shared. The game was also characterized by many vicious Lafayette hits.

The 2006 season also witnessed the reopening of Fisher Field. During the off-season, the 80-year-old stadium underwent extensive renovations that included new bleachers, press box, scoreboard, FieldTurf, and a football varsity house complex, among many other additions.

Winning seasons continued through 2009. Lafayette defeated Lehigh for the fourth straight year in 2007, the first such string of Leopard victories since the 1943–1949 seasons. In 2008, Lafayette knocked off 14th-ranked Liberty University on their home field to end the nation's longest active home winning streak. Led by quarterback Rob Curley, the Leopards had a record-breaking campaign in 2009. After starting 1–1, Lafayette won seven straight games, their longest in-season winning streak since the 9–0 1940 squad. The Leopards were also ranked 20th, the sixth straight season that they were in the top 25. Curley also had a record campaign by being the only Lafayette quarterback to throw for over 3,000 yards in a season and finished with a Lafayette record 28 touchdowns. He also threw for a record seven touchdowns in a wild 56–49 win over nationally ranked Colgate. At 8–1, Lafayette lost their next two games and their chance at a league championship. A two-point loss to eventual champion Holy Cross under controversial circumstances and an overtime upset loss at Lehigh kept the Leopards from their fourth playoff berth and title of the Tavani era.

The Leopards struggled in the 2010 and 2011 seasons as injuries, depth, and the loss of many key players had a tremendous impact on the team. On November 30, 2016, Frank Tavani left Lafayette after 30 years on staff and 40 years of coaching college football.

=== John Garrett era (2016–2021) ===
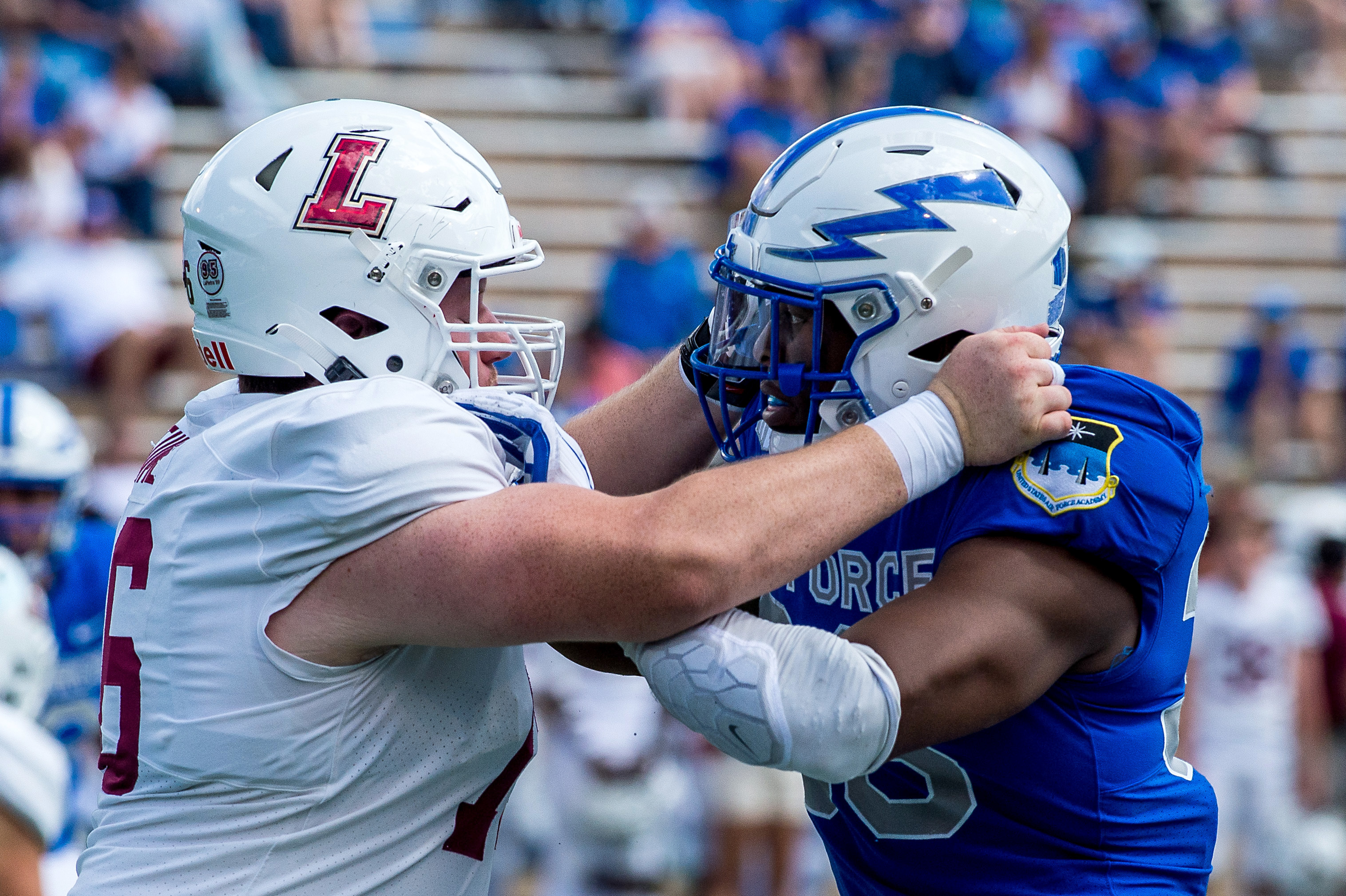
A Lafayette player (left) grapples with an Air Force opponent during a 2021 game

On December 21, 2016, former NFL assistant and college football assistant coach John Garrett (brother of Jason Garrett, then head coach of the Dallas Cowboys) was named the new Lafayette head football coach. Garrett was fired on November 22, 2021, following the 10–17 loss to Lehigh on November 20.

=== John Troxell era (2022-present) ===
On December 14, 2021, Lafayette hired its alumnus, John Troxell who most recently served 16 seasons at Franklin & Marshall.

== Conference affiliations ==
Lafayette has been both an independent and affiliated with two conferences.

- Independent (1882–1985)
- Colonial League (1986–1989)
- Patriot League (1990–present)

== Head coaches ==
The following served as head coach at Lafayette.

Coach	Seasons	Years	Record	Pct.
No coach	9	1882–1890	35–29–4	.544
Wallace Moyle	2	1891–1892	7–16–1	.313
Pearl T. Haskell & H. H. Vincent	1	1893	3–6	.333
Hugh Janeway & H. H. Vincent	1	1894	5–6	.455
Parke H. Davis	3	1895–1897	28–12–2	.700
Samuel B. Newton	5	1898–1901, 1911	34–8	.810
Dave Fultz	1	1902	8–3	.727
Alfred E. Bull	5	1903–1907	37–10–3	.770
George Barclay	1	1908	6–2–2	.700
Bob Folwell	3	1909–1911	19–2–1	.886
George McCaa	2	1912–1913	8–10–2	.450
Wilmer G. Crowell	3	1914–1916	15–12–3	.550
Punk Berryman	1	1917	3–5	.375
Lewis A. Cobbett	1	1918	3–4	.429
Jock Sutherland	5	1919–1923	33–8–2	.791
Herb McCracken	12	1924–1935	59–40–6	.590
Ernie Nevers	1	1936	1–8	.111
Edward Mylin	7	1937–1942, 1946	36–24–1	.598
Ben Wolfson	3	1943-45	11–9–1	.548
Ivy Williamson	2	1947–1948	13–5	.722
Clipper Smith	3	1949–1951	4–21	.160
Steve Hokuf	6	1952–1957	25–27	.481
James McConlogue	5	1958–1962	20–23–2	.466
Kenneth Bunn	4	1963–1966	7–28–2	.216
Harry Gamble	4	1967–1970	21–19	.525
Neil Putnam	10	1971–1980	44–55–3	.446
Bill Russo	19	1981–1999	103–98–4	.512
Frank Tavani	17	2000–2016	84–107	.440
John Garrett	5	2017–2021	15–33	.313
John Troxell	4	2022–present	27–20	.574

== Championships ==
=== National championships ===
Lafayette has been selected national champions in three seasons (1896, 1921, 1926) by NCAA-designated major selectors. Lafayette claims all three national titles.

Year	Conference	Coach	Selectors	Record
1896	Independent	Parke H. Davis	National Championship Foundation, Parke Davis	11–0–1
1921	Independent	Jock Sutherland	Boand System, Parke Davis	9–0
1926	Independent	Herb McCracken	Parke Davis	9–0

1896

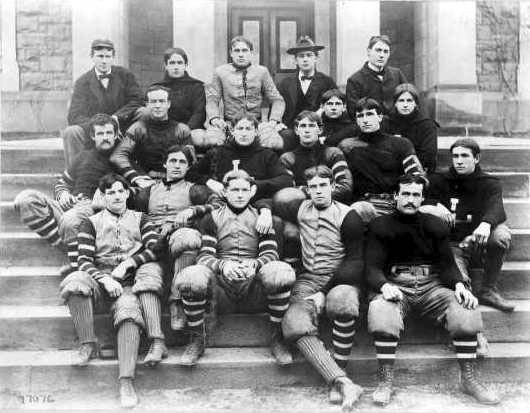
The Lafayette Maroon 1896 National Champions team photo was a souvenir provided in a cigar box.

Lafayette's 1896 championship was one of the most surprising and dramatic in the history of college football, and included arguably the first college football 'upset.' Lafayette began their season by tying Princeton 0–0, the first tie in their series, and defeated the University of West Virginia three times in three days by a combined score of 56–0. At 4–0–1, Lafayette was set to meet Pennsylvania on October 24 at Franklin Field. Penn, coached by George Woodruff, was in the midst of a 34-game winning streak and was only guaranteeing Lafayette $150 for a game that would net $10,000. As an intense media war surrounded the game, Lafayette enrolled Fielding H. Yost, a tackle from West Virginia, whom Lafayette had defeated in the final game of their series on October 17. With Yost, College Football Hall of Famer Charles "Babe" Rinehart, and the inventor of the football helmet George 'Rose' Barclay on the field, Lafayette won 6–4. It was the first victory of a 'small school' over one of the Big Four (Harvard-Yale-Penn-Princeton). Penn would win its next 31 games. Lafayette closed its season with an 18–6 win over Navy. Following the season, Lafayette was recognized as national champions along with Princeton (11–0–1) and was the first national champion outside of the H-Y-P-P rotation. However, absent from their 1896 schedule was Lehigh, who protested the eligibility and amateur status of George Barclay who had played professional baseball at Chambersburg the previous summer.

1921

In their final game, Lafayette defeated Lehigh University 28–6, prompting major papers such as the New York Herald to proclaim Lafayette to possess a share of the mythical title. Lafayette was mentioned in the press along with the University of Iowa (7–0), which upset Knute Rockne and Notre Dame (10–1) to end a 20-game winning streak. Officially, the NCAA record book recognizes the University of California (9–0–1), Cornell University (8–0), Lafayette, Iowa, and Washington & Jefferson (10–0–1) as champions, with only California, Cornell, and Lafayette claiming the title.

According to Sutherland, Lafayette was approached by promoters to play a postseason game against a team from the west or southwest. Ultimately, Washington & Jefferson accepted an invitation to play California in the 1922 Rose Bowl. Lafayette and the Presidents had three common opponents in 1921: Pittsburgh, Bucknell University, and Lehigh. And both Lafayette and the Presidents won by nearly identical scores: Pittsburgh 6–0 vs. 7–0, Bucknell University 20–7 vs. 26–0, Lehigh 28–6 vs. 14–7. However, the policy of the athletic committee prohibited Lafayette from playing postseason games. Sutherland was also hesitant to play any postseason games as well, citing the 1921 team had the same players as the 'mediocre' 1920 team.

1926

The Maroon entered 1926 having narrowly missed winning the 1925 national championship. The previous year, Lafayette defeated the University of Pittsburgh for the Panthers lone loss in a season where they would be crowned Eastern champions. However, Lafayette tied Colgate University 7–7 at Franklin Field and lost to Washington & Jefferson 7–6 at the Polo Grounds.

The Leopards received a boost on opening day by inaugurating Lafayette Stadium. Their still unfinished stadium, which was soon to be known as Fisher Field and modeled after Harvard Stadium, saw the Leopards defeat Muhlenberg College 35–0. Lafayette and Pittsburgh played another classic at Forbes Field, a 17–7 Maroon victory. Entering their sixth game at 5–0 and averaging 34 points per game, Lafayette met Washington & Jefferson and legendary coach Andy Kerr in what would soon become one of the greatest games in school history. Down 10–0 heading into halftime, Herb McCracken benched the entire starting 11 and had a starters-only closed-door meeting at halftime. The strategy worked, as Lafayette scored on the sixth play of the second half. Late in the fourth, down 10–9 and at their own 12 on third down, a fake punt handoff kept the drive alive. After a long pass to the W&J 35, a reverse-lateral-forward pass put the Maroon on the four with seconds to play. Tuffy Guest punched in the winning score and sent the Presidents to their only loss in a 7–1–1 season. McCracken called the victory the most dramatic, spirited and determined of his career, while sportswriters dubbed the game among the top ten they had witnessed.

Lafayette did not surrender a point the rest of the season and scored the fewest points in a 35–0 win over Lehigh. Following the season and the nation's leading scorer Mike "George" Wilson's exploits, Lafayette was crowned Eastern champion. The Associated Press also crowned Lafayette as the national five-year champion, ahead of Michigan, Notre Dame, and the selected Rose Bowl participant Alabama.

=== Conference championships ===
Lafayette has won eight conference championships.

Year	Conference	Coach	Overall record	Conference record
1988	Colonial League	Bill Russo	8–2–1	5–0
1992	Patriot League	Bill Russo	8–3	5–0
1994	Patriot League	Bill Russo	5–6	5–0
2004	Patriot League	Frank Tavani	8–4	5–1
2005	Patriot League	Frank Tavani	8–4	5–1
2006	Patriot League	Frank Tavani	6–6	5–1
2013	Patriot League	Frank Tavani	5–7	4–1
2023	Patriot League	John Troxell	9–3	5–1

== Postseason ==
=== NCAA Division I-AA/FCS playoffs ===
The Leopards have made five appearances in the FCS Playoffs, with a combined record of 0–5.

Year	Round	Opponent	Result
2004	First Round	Delaware	L, 14–28
2005	First Round	Appalachian State	L, 23–34
2006	First Round	Massachusetts	L, 14–35
2013	First Round	New Hampshire	L, 7–45
2023	First Round	Delaware	L, 34–36

== Stadium and facilities ==
=== Fisher Field ===
The Leopards have played their home games at Fisher Field at Fisher Stadium since the 1926 season. The Field's west end was the site of the Easton City Dump. Fisher Field was made possible through a substantial donation by Thomas Fisher, Class of 1888, who almost single-handed raised the $445,000 for the Field's construction. The Field used to be known solely as Fisher Field until the 2006 season, when it was upgraded with FieldTurf, jogging track, new visitor stands, new bleacher seats, chairback seats, a video replay board, landscaping, lighting, press box, convenience stands, and the Bourger Varsity House. It acquired the name 'Fisher Stadium' to reflect the generosity of James Fisher, Class of 1977 (no relation), who donated a significant sum for the $23 million renovation. Fisher Field at Fisher Stadium is subsequently recognized as having one of the best FCS facilities in the country.

Previously, Fisher Field contained a six-lane running track and track-and-field competition areas adjacent to the playing surface. The field was natural grass and a simple scoreboard at the west end of the stadium, which is the current location of the Bourger Varsity House. Additionally, the bleachers on the home side of the field were natural wood and thought to have been the original seats dating to the 1920s. In the early 21st century, seating areas became dangerous as rotting wood seats and their loose screws were uncomfortable for spectators. The press box and coaches' boxes rested at the top of the grandstand and were constructed approximately in the 1950s, according to old photos. The visiting stands' dimension and capacity altered several times, with the last concrete grandstand being built in 1973 along with the construction of Allan P. Kirby Field House.

=== March Field ===
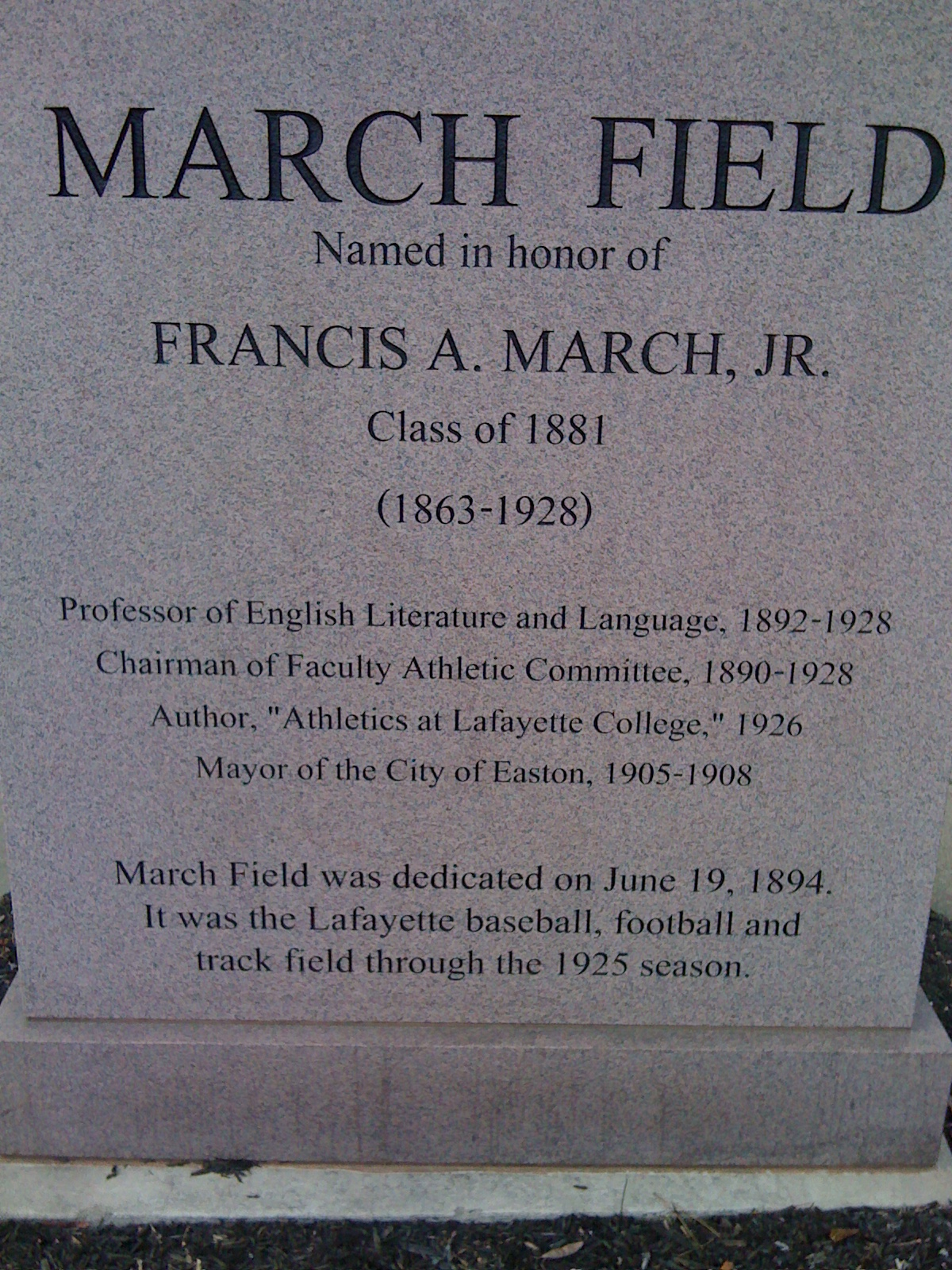
A marker currently stands between Farber and Ramer Hall dorms on March Field. None of the original structures remain, though the dimensions of the Field remain the same. DKE, Phi Psi, Ramer, Farber, Kunkel Hall, and portion of Hugel Hall occupy the former athletics grounds.

March Field served as the primary venue from 1894 through 1925. The first organized athletic structure built at Lafayette was a small grandstand in front of Martien Hall (located on dormitory row, near the site of the current Kirby House), seating roughly 250 spectators. The grandstand, built in 1890, was one of the first acts of the newly formed Alumni Advisory Committee. Though the grandstand was well received by the college at the time, the Alumni Advisory Committee wanted to establish a formal athletics grounds.

The site for the athletics grounds, which would be known as March Field, was identified as early as 1890. "The ground lies on the historic Sullivan road, or as it is more commonly called, Lover's Lane, fronting 440 feet on that street, beginning 7 feet west of the reservoir, and extending southwest between parallel lines to the Bushkill Creek, and contains about 7 acres." Plans included a 440-yard circular track, 100-yard straight away track, baseball and football fields, grandstand, large bleachers, and carriage stand. The entrance would be at the reservoir, which was at the time a reserve reservoir of the Easton Water Company.

Engineers in the sophomore class surveyed the grounds in 1890, but financing was difficult. Originally anticipated to cost $2,000, the rocky subsurface on the upper half of the field and required grading on the lower half increased the cost to $3,000. The Panic of 1893, along with funds solicited mainly from the Alumni Advisory Committee members and alumni meetings, slowed progress on the field. Professor Francis A. March Jr. enabled the field's completion in 1894 by writing an alumni fundraising letter and selling bonds on the field, with the new field's mortgage as collateral.

The field opened on June 19, 1894, with an all-Lafayette track meet that featured Olympic events, baseball throw, and tennis matches. Before baseball and football games could be played, special soil had to be imported since the hard, clay soil was not suitable to grow grass. The first football game was hosted on October 3, with a 36–0 defeat of Gettysburg College. Ultimately, the cost of the field was $12,000.

The new field was soon unable to accommodate the athletics program. Since the football, baseball, and track configurations overlapped each other due to the angle of the field and the reservoir, the Athletic Association had to spend money on contractors to build and disassemble the bleachers for each season. The effort soon plunged the Alumni Advisory Committee into debt. However, the Committee devised a permanent solution: purchase the reservoir, enlarge the grounds, and build a field house. At commencement in 1904, the field house cornerstone was laid and work on the new field was completed towards the end of 1905 for a total cost of $9,000.

=== The Quad ===
The Quad is located in the center of Lafayette's campus and served as the venue of the first Lafayette–Lehigh in 1884 and other games through 1893. Baseball was also played on the Quad. Sources from the period indicate that games were played on the level ground between McKeen Hall and college buildings to the south (known today as the Quad). Since football was a new sport and organized by the undergraduates, games were played on the open field in the central area of campus. Small, but manageable crowds would attend the games, mostly consisting of students, alumni, and faculty. Spectators stood or sat alongside the unenclosed field, while undergrads watched the games from their dormitories that flanked the Quad. Around 1888 and 1889, crowds at Lafayette football games began to surge. Attempts were made to collect money for ticket revenues to offset the costs of athletic equipment, a trainer, and a training table. Policemen would be stationed at the entrances of the college to enforce the new ticket policies, however, it was not difficult to avoid paying the small fee. Young boys and many citizens of Easton would easily gain admittance, with only alumni wishing to support the new, informal athletic association paid for tickets. The need to raise revenue from ticket sales, as well as growing crowds, a few spectator incidents, and the persistent destruction of the Quad's grass, led to the formation of the Alumni Advisory Committee that soon raised funds for the new enclosed March Field.

== Tradition ==
=== Nickname ===
The Lafayette Student Council voted on the nickname "Leopards" since many other rival schools, such as Princeton, Pittsburgh, and Bucknell, had animal nicknames. It is not clear why the nickname "Leopards" was selected, although it is reasonable to speculate that an 'L' nickname was ideal since other schools had animal nicknames that started with the school's first letter (Pittsburgh Panthers, Bucknell Bison). The leopard was also selected because its 'cunning and physical strength, combined with the fact that it is irresistible when aroused, seemed to be typical of a Lafayette team.' The Leopard mascot made its debut against Washington & Jefferson at Yankee Stadium on October 25, 1924, a 20–6 Leopard victory.

=== Rivalries ===
==== Lehigh ====
Lehigh is Lafayette's primary rival and is the most played rivalry in college football (160 games as of the 2024 season). The rivalry is also the longest running annual college football series in the United States, with the two schools meeting every year since 1897. Many publications, such as ESPN and Sports Illustrated, have dubbed the Lafayette–Lehigh rivalry as one of the most fierce and "must-see" events in college football. The schools played twice annually from 1884 until 1902, with three games in 1891, one at a neutral site in Wilkes-Barre, Pennsylvania. The schools also played two games annually during 1943 and 1944.

== Individual honors ==
The Leopards have placed 13 players on the All-American team, two of which earned the distinction twice. Due to the division of college football between FBS (I-A) and FCS (I-AA), Lafayette's All-Americans are divided between different eras.

Although Lafayette earned many All-America team selections from various publications, especially in the early half of the 20th century, the Leopards' major college football All-Americans are considered consensus selections by receiving the majority of votes at their respective position by the NCAA Football Records book. Its FCS era selections were named first-team All-Americans by a variety of recognized publications.

=== Retired numbers ===
Lafayette has retired only one jersey in its entire 130 season history, that of Fred Kirby of the class of 1942. In addition to being a standout player for the Leopards, Kirby was a dedicated alumnus who supported the program and was a recognized figure in the world of college football. In 2000, he received the Gold Medal Award from the National Football Foundation and was a member of the NFF from its founding in 1958 and was a board member until his death in 2011. His jersey was retired on October 1, 2011, during the intermission of a game against Harvard.

Lafayette Leopards retired numbers
No.	Player	Pos.	Tenure	No. ret.	Ref.
53	Fred Kirby	DL/OL	1939–1941	2011	

=== Major Awards ===
Several Leopards have also won major regional and national awards.

- Amos Alonzo Stagg Award

1988 Herb McCracken

- Eddie Robinson Coach of the Year

1988 Bill Russo

- ECAC Player of the Year

1988 Frank Baur, QB

- ECAC Rookie of the Year

1988 Tom Costello, RB
2000 Marko Glavic, QB
2001 Joe McCourt, RB

- CFPA National Freshman Performer of the Year

2013 Drew Reed, QB

== Lafayette's NFL Players ==
Lafayette has sent several players to the NFL since the inception of the league in 1920. A majority of the Leopards who played in the NFL were members of the early league, when Lafayette was a major college football power and possessed some of the top talent in the country.

- Malik Hamm (LB, 2023–present) – Signed as undrafted free agent by the Baltimore Ravens.

=== Pottsville Maroons ===
During the 1920s, several Lafayette alumni played for the NFL's Pottsville Maroons. The Maroons are best known for their role in the well documented and infamous 1925 NFL Championship controversy. Four players on the famous 1925 squad played for Lafayette: Charlie Berry, Jack Ernst, Joe Mahrefka, and Bob Millman. Berry played the largest role on the team, leading the NFL in scoring with 74 points and kicked the game-winning field goal against the University of Notre Dame All-Stars, the game which caused the NFL Championship controversy. Berry's field goal was arguably one of the most famous moments in the early NFL since college football was considered superior to the NFL and Notre Dame featured the famed Four Horsemen. Lafayette standout Frank Kirkleski also played for Pottsville in 1927.

== Future non-conference opponents ==
Announced schedules as of January 2, 2026.

2026	2027	2028
at UConn	at Air Force	at Akron
Marist	at Marist	
at Columbia	Columbia	
	Princeton	
	at Wagner	
