= Robert E. Kelley =

U.S. Air Force lieutenant general (1933–2021)

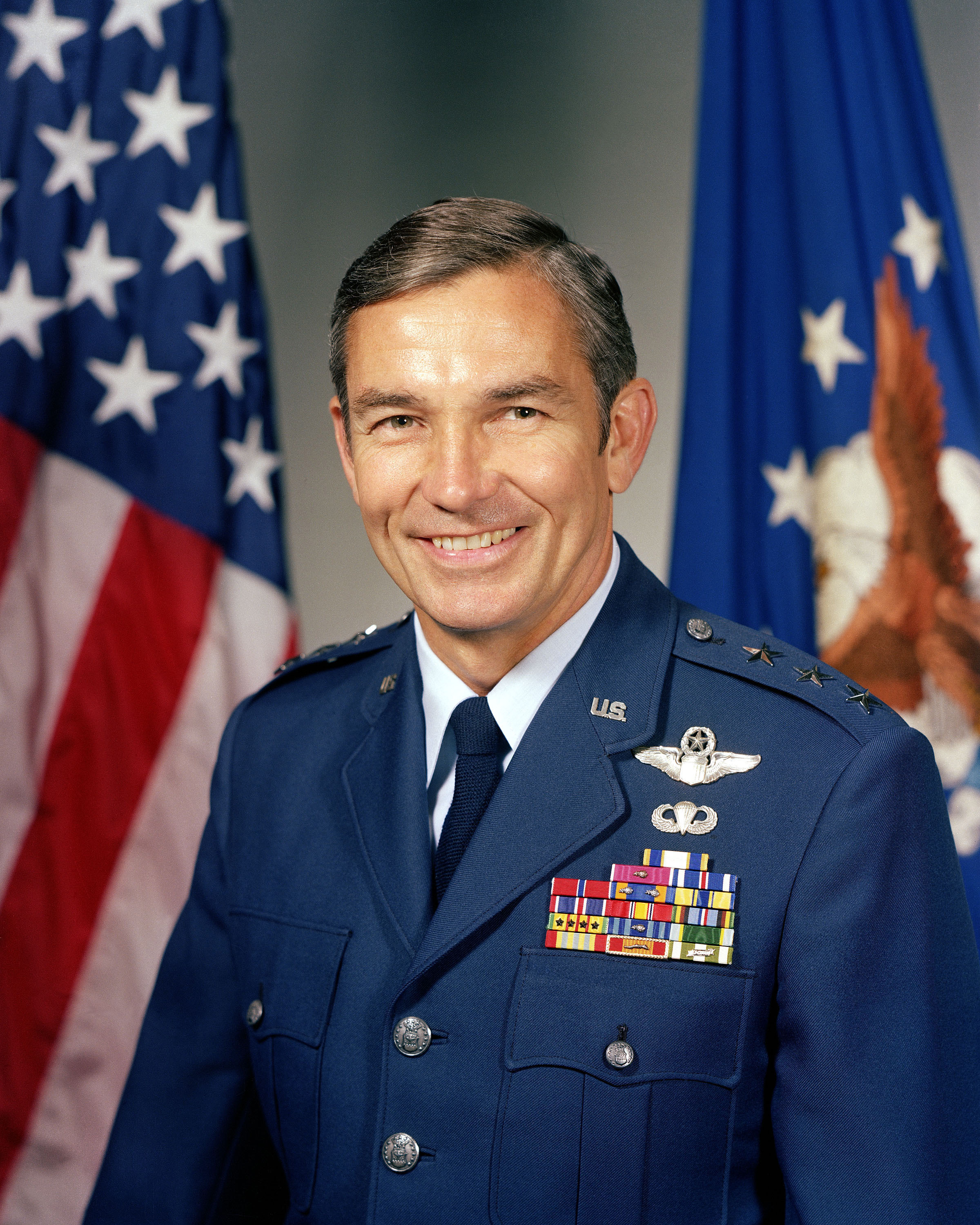
- Kelley in 1983
- Born: Robert Edwin Kelley; November 3, 1933; Albany, New York, U.S.
- Died: February 5, 2021 (aged 87); Marblehead, Massachusetts, U.S.
- Military career
- Allegiance: United States of America
- Branch: United States Air Force
- Service years: 1956–1986
- Rank: Lieutenant General
- Nickname: Bob
- Commands: Superintendent, USAF Academy
- Conflicts: Vietnam War
- Awards: Air Force Distinguished Service Medal; Legion of Merit (twice); Distinguished Flying Cross; Bronze Star; Air Medal (nine times)
- Other work: Director, The Canon Institute; President, Freedoms Foundation at Valley Forge

Robert E. Kelley (November 3, 1933 – February 5, 2021) was a United States Air Force lieutenant general, the ninth Superintendent of the U.S. Air Force Academy. He retired as a lieutenant general on September 1, 1986.

== Early life and education ==
Born in Albany, New York, Robert Edwin "Bob" Kelley was raised in New Canaan, Connecticut. He attended Peekskill Military Academy and then Rutgers University where he was a brother in Chi Psi. During his senior year at Rutgers, he was co-captain of the football team and also served as captain of the lacrosse team. Kelley earned a Bachelor of Science degree in June 1956 and was commissioned in the U.S. Air Force as a distinguished military graduate of the Air Force Reserve Officer Training Corps program.

Kelley earned his Master of Science degree in international affairs from George Washington University in Washington, D.C. in 1973, where his thesis was entitled Policy, military strategy and capabilities in the Nixon era. He was also a graduate of the National War College at Fort Lesley J. McNair, also in Washington, D.C.

== Military career ==
Kelley entered primary flying training at Bainbridge Air Base, Georgia in August 1956 and completed basic flying training at Greenville AFB, Mississippi, earning his wings in September 1957. Combat crew training in F-86Fs (with "Top Gun" award) and F-100s followed at Williams AFB, Arizona and Nellis AFB, Nevada.

His first operational assignment was as an F-100 pilot with the 461st Fighter-Day Squadron of the 36th Tactical Fighter Wing at Hahn Air Base, West Germany. In May 1959, Kelley joined the 53rd Tactical Fighter Squadron at Ramstein Air Base, also in West Germany, serving as a Special Weapons Officer and becoming a Select Crew member.

Returning to the United States in 1961, Kelley was checked-out in F-104 Starfighters with the 435th Tactical Fighter Squadron of the 479th Tactical Fighter Wing at George AFB, California. He was redeployed to Germany in the fall of 1961 as part of the United States response to the Berlin crisis. In January 1962, Kelley was selected to help form the 4443rd Combat Crew Training Squadron at George AFB. This unit trained Allied instructor pilots in F-104Gs as part of the Military Assistance Program.

From 1964 to 1967, Kelley served in the Department of Athletics at the U.S. Air Force Academy, Colorado, as the director's administrative assistant and coached varsity lacrosse (1st varsity coach) and skiing. During this tour of duty, he qualified as an airborne parachutist (with Leadership Award) at Fort Benning, Georgia.

Following three years at the academy, Kelley completed F-4 combat crew training (with "Top Gun" award) at Davis Monthan AFB, Arizona. He remained at Davis-Monthan as an F-4 instructor pilot and served as executive officer of the 4453rd Combat Crew Training Wing until December 1968, when he joined the 366th Tactical Fighter Wing at Da Nang Air Base in the Republic of Vietnam. En route to Southeast Asia, he completed the U.S. Air Force Fighter Weapons Instructor Course (with Flying Award) at Nellis AFB. While at Da Nang, Kelley completed 119 combat missions in F-4Es before being assigned, in November 1969, as executive officer of the Tactical Air Control Center Headquarters, Seventh Air Force, at Tan Son Nhut Air Base in the Republic of Vietnam.

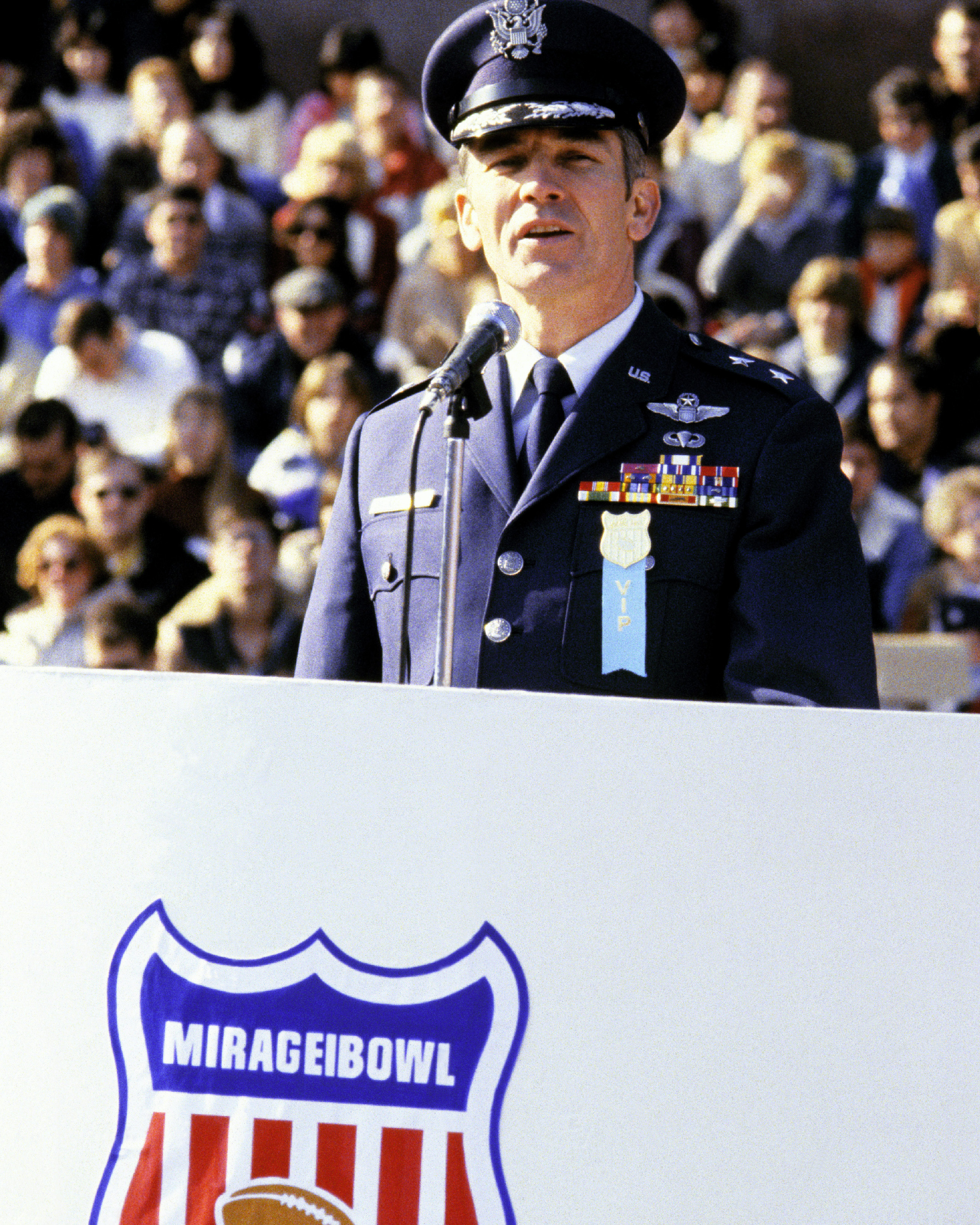
Kelley speaking at the Mirage Bowl in Japan in 1981

On his return from Southeast Asia in June 1970, Kelley became an operations staff officer in the tactics branch of fighter operations at Tactical Air Command's headquarters in Langley AFB, Virginia. His responsibilities included the Air-to-Air Weapons Evaluation program, Air Combat Maneuvering Instrumentation, Continental Operations Range and MCM 3-1 issues. From August 1972 to July 1973, he attended the National War College.

In 1973, Kelley was assigned to the Air Force headquarters in Washington, D.C., where he served as Chief of the Fighter Forces Branch in the Office of the Deputy Chief of Staff for Plans and Operations. He was a member of the Tactical Fighter Force Modernization Study Group convened by the Chief of Staff and charged with developing a modernization strategy for the 1980s. He became Assistant for General Officer Matters at the Office of the Deputy Chief of Staff, Personnel, in June 1974.

Kelley served as Vice Commander of the U.S. Air Force Tactical Air Warfare Center, Eglin AFB, Florida, from July 1977 to July 1978; then as Vice Commander of the West Coast Delta Force; and then as Commander of Tactical Training, at Davis-Monthan AFB. In March 1979, he took command of the U.S. Air Force Tactical Fighter Weapons Center at Nellis AFB and also served as chairman of the executive committee Multinational Test and Evaluation of the F-16 Fighting Falcon.

Kelley was appointed the ninth Superintendent of the U.S. Air Force Academy, Colorado, in June 1981, and served for two years. Promoted to lieutenant general in 1983, his final assignment was back at Langley AFB as Vice Commander, Tactical Air Command; he retired at age 52 on October 1, 1986.

== Flight hours, awards, and decorations ==
Kelley was a command pilot with more than 4,000 flying hours. Fighter and attack aircraft he has flown include F-86, F-100, F-104, F-4, A-7, A-10, F-5, F-15, F-16 and F-111.

His military decorations and awards include the Air Force Distinguished Service Medal with oak-leaf cluster, Legion of Merit with oak-leaf cluster, Distinguished Flying Cross, Bronze Star, Air Medal with eight oak-leaf clusters, Air Force Commendation Medal, Republic of Vietnam Armed Forces Honor Medal 1st Class and Republic of Vietnam Gallantry Cross with Palm.

- Air Force Distinguished Service Medal with oak-leaf cluster.
- Legion of Merit with oak-leaf cluster.
- Distinguished Flying Cross
- Bronze Star
- Air Medal with eight oak-leaf clusters
- Air Force Commendation Medal

== Post-military life ==
Kelley served as a director of The Canon Institute in Princeton, New Jersey, and President of the Freedoms Foundation at Valley Forge. He founded a defense consulting firm, a sports marketing company, and Wright Stuff Press. Kelley also served as senior military advisor to the Air Force's "Gulf War Air Power Survey."

He served on the Board of the Lacrosse Foundation & Hall of Fame, the Board of Veterans Advantage, the Board of Directors of the Air Force Academy Foundation, and the American-European Community Association. He was a member of the Order of Daedalians, a life member of US Lacrosse and US Squash and a member of The Merion Cricket Club.

In 1983, Kelley received an honorary Doctor of Science degree from the University of Nevada, Las Vegas. In 1984, he was inducted into the National Lacrosse Hall of Fame. Kelley was inducted into the Rutgers Athletic Hall of Fame in 1994 and into the Rutgers Hall of Distinguished Alumni in 1999. He won the National Squash Championship for his age group in 1999; the Hyder Trophy in 2000 and the Eastern States Veterans Championship in 2001.

Kelley died on February 5, 2021. He was interred at the United States Air Force Academy Cemetery on June 14, 2021.

Preceded by Kenneth L. Tallman	Superintendent of the United States Air Force Academy; 1981 – 1983	Succeeded by Winfield W. Scott Jr.
