= 1955 Lafayette Leopards football team =

American college football season

1955 Lafayette Leopards football

Middle Three champion
- Conference: Middle Three Conference
- Record: 6–2 (2–0 Middle Three)
- Head coach: Steve Hokuf (4th season)
- Captains: Jack Burcin; Bob Fyvie
- Home stadium: Fisher Field

1955 Middle Three Conference football standings
| | Conf. | | | | | Overall |
| Team | W | | L | | T | W | | L | | T |
|---|---|---|---|---|---|---|---|---|---|---|
| Lafayette $ | 2 | – | 0 | – | 0 | 6 | – | 2 | – | 0 |
| Lehigh | 1 | – | 1 | – | 0 | 4 | – | 5 | – | 0 |
| Rutgers | 0 | – | 2 | – | 0 | 3 | – | 5 | – | 0 |
$ – Conference champion

The 1955 Lafayette Leopards football team was an American football team that represented Lafayette College during the 1955 college football season. Lafayette won the Middle Three Conference championship. In their fourth year under head coach Steve Hokuf, the Leopards compiled a 6–2 record, and defeated both of their Middle Three opponents. Bob Fyvie and Jack Burcin were the team captains. Lafayette played home games at Fisher Field on College Hill in Easton, Pennsylvania.

== Schedule ==
| Date | Opponent | Site | Result | Attendance | Source |
|---|---|---|---|---|---|
| September 24 | Muhlenberg* | Fisher Field; Easton, PA | W 7–0 | 3,000 | |
| October 1 | at Carnegie Tech* | Forbes Field; Pittsburgh, PA | W 41–14 | 4,000 | |
| October 8 | Delaware* | Fisher Field; Easton, PA | L 6–14 | 5,000 | |
| October 15 | at Dartmouth* | Memorial Field; Hanover, NH | W 21–13 | | |
| October 22 | Bucknell* | Fisher Field; Easton, PA | W 34–13 | 9,000 | |
| October 29 | at Gettysburg* | Musselman Stadium; Gettysburg, PA | L 14–15 | 5,000 | |
| November 5 | Rutgers | Fisher Field; Easton, PA | W 16–7 | 8,500 | |
| November 20 | at Lehigh | Taylor Stadium; Bethlehem, PA (The Rivalry) | W 35–6 | 15,000 | |
*Non-conference game
