= 1955 Lehigh Engineers football team =

American college football season

1955 Lehigh Engineers football
- Conference: Middle Three Conference
- Record: 7–2 (1–1 Middle Three)
- Head coach: Bill Leckonby (10th season)
- Captain: Bruno Pagnani
- Home stadium: Taylor Stadium

1955 Middle Three Conference football standings
	Conf.					Overall
Team	W		L		T	W		L		T
Lafayette $	2	–	0	–	0	6	–	2	–	0
Lehigh	1	–	1	–	0	4	–	5	–	0
Rutgers	0	–	2	–	0	3	–	5	–	0
$ – Conference champion

The 1955 Lehigh Engineers football team was an American football team that represented Lehigh University during the 1955 college football season. Lehigh placed second in the Middle Three Conference.

In their tenth year under head coach Bill Leckonby, the Engineers compiled a 7–2 record, 1–1 against conference opponents. Bruno Pagnani was the team captain.

Lehigh played its home games at Taylor Stadium on the university's main campus in Bethlehem, Pennsylvania.

== Schedule ==
Date	Opponent	Site	Result	Attendance	Source
September 24	at Cornell*	Schoellkopf Field; Ithaca, NY	L 6–14	10,000	
October 1	at Delaware*	Delaware Stadium; Newark, DE (rivalry)	W 19–13	5,600	
October 8	Bucknell*	Taylor Stadium; Bethlehem, PA	W 27–20	6,500	
October 15	at Gettysburg*	Musselman Stadium; Gettysburg, PA	W 21–18	5,000	
October 22	at Rutgers	Rutgers Stadium; Piscataway, NJ	W 21–14	11,000	
October 29	Temple*	Taylor Stadium; Bethlehem, PA	W 27–14	4,200	
November 5	VMI*	Taylor Stadium; Bethlehem, PA	W 39–0	5,000	
November 12	at Albright*	Albright College Stadium; Reading, PA	W 51–19	3,500	
November 19	Lafayette	Taylor Stadium; Bethlehem, PA (The Rivalry)	L 6–35	15,000	
*Non-conference game
