= Hugh Janeway =

American football player, coach, and referee (1865–1921)

Biographical details
- Born: December 3, 1865; Plainfield, New Jersey, U.S.
- Died: January 1, 1921 (aged 55); Philadelphia, Pennsylvania, U.S.

Playing career

Football
- 1889: Princeton

Track
- 1889: Princeton
- Position: Guard

Coaching career (HC unless noted)

Football
- 1894: Lafayette

Head coaching record
- Overall: 5–6

Hugh H. Janeway (December 3, 1865 – January 1, 1921) was an American football player, coach, and referee. He served as the co-head football coach with H. H. Vincent at Lafayette College in 1894, compiling a record of 5–6. Janeway played college football at Princeton University, where was a member of the 1889 Princeton Tigers football team, later recognized as a consensus national champion. He was also the captain of Princeton's track team in 1889. Janeway served as the head referee for the 1891 Yale vs. Crescent Athletic Club contest.

Janeway was born on December 3, 1865, in Plainfield, New Jersey. He died suddenly on January 1, 1921, in Philadelphia, Pennsylvania.

== Head coaching record ==
Year	Team	Overall	Conference	Standing	Bowl/playoffs
Lafayette (Independent) (1893–1894)
1894	Lafayette	5–6			
Lafayette:		5–6			
Total:		5–6			
