= Alfred E. Bull =

American sportsperson (1867–1930)

Biographical details
- Born: February 5, 1867; Wilkes-Barre, Pennsylvania, U.S.
- Died: January 20, 1930 (aged 62); Wilkes-Barre, Pennsylvania, U.S.

Playing career
- 1894–1895: Penn
- 1898: Latrobe Athletic Association
- Positions: Center, quarterback

Coaching career (HC unless noted)
- 1896: Iowa
- 1896–1897: Franklin & Marshall
- 1898: Latrobe Athletic Association
- 1900: Georgetown
- 1902: Penn (assistant)
- 1903–1907: Lafayette
- 1908–1910: Muhlenberg

Head coaching record
- Overall: 62–34–15 (college)

Accomplishments and honors

Championships
- 1 WIUFA (1896)

Awards
- Consensus All-American (1895)

Alfred E. Bull (February 5, 1867 – January 20, 1930) was an American football player, coach and rower. He played football at the University of Pennsylvania and was selected as a center to the 1895 College Football All-America Team. Bull later served as the head football coach at the University of Iowa (1896), Franklin & Marshall College (1896–1897), Georgetown University (1900), Lafayette College (1903–1907), and Muhlenberg College (1908–1910), compiling a career college football coaching record of 62–34–15.

== Early life and education ==
Bull was born on February 5, 1867, in Wilkes-Barre, Pennsylvania. He attended the University of Pennsylvania in Philadelphia, where he graduated with a degree in dentistry, played football for the Penn Quakers, and was named to the All-American team in 1895.

During a game between Penn and the Carlisle Indian Industrial School, Bull faced off against All-American and early professional footballer Bemus Pierce. Bull and Pierce faced each other on the line throughout the game. On a play late in the game, Pierce knocked Bull to the ground, and the play went over him. After the play, Pierce, who was a Native American, cried out to the Penn players, "Look, look at Sitting Bull." Bull also rowed for the Penn crew.

== Coaching and professional playing career ==
After graduating from Penn, Bull served as head football coach at Iowa, Franklin & Marshall, Georgetown, Lafayette, and Muhlenberg, compiling a record of 62–34–15 in a career that lasted from 1896 to 1910. Bull's 1896 Iowa team won the first conference title in school history. Bull played quarterback and served as the coach for the Latrobe Athletic Association in 1898. The 1898 team started off to a 7–0 record, before losing three games to Pittsburgh Athletic Club, Duquesne Country and Athletic Club and the Greensburg Athletic Association to finish 7–3.

== Later life ==
Bull spent the last 30 years of his life, from 1900 to 1930, practicing dentistry in Wilkes-Barre, Pennsylvania.

== Head coaching record ==
=== College ===
Year	Team	Overall	Conference	Standing	Bowl/playoffs
Iowa Hawkeyes (Western Interstate University Football Association) (1896)
1896	Iowa	7–1–1	2–0–1	1st	
Iowa:		7–1–1	2–0–1		
Franklin & Marshall (Independent) (1896–1897)
1896	Franklin & Marshall	3–4–2			
1897	Franklin & Marshall	2–6–2			
Franklin & Marshall:		5–10–4			
Georgetown Blue and Gray (Independent) (1900)
1900	Georgetown	5–1–3			
Georgetown:		5–1–3			
Lafayette (Independent) (1903–1907)
1903	Lafayette	7–3			
1904	Lafayette	8–2			
1905	Lafayette	7–2–1			
1906	Lafayette	8–1–1			
1907	Lafayette	7–2–1			
Lafayette:		37–10–3			
Muhlenberg Cardinal and Grey (Independent) (1908–1910)
1908	Muhlenberg	2–5–1			
1909	Muhlenberg	3–4–2			
1908	Muhlenberg	3–3–1			
Muhlenberg:		8–12–4			
Total:		62–34–15			
