= Frank Tavani =

American football player and coach (born 1953)

Biographical details
- Born: July 31, 1953 (age 73)

Playing career
- 1972–1975: Lebanon Valley
- Position: Running back

Coaching career (HC unless noted)
- 1976–1985: Franklin & Marshall (OC)
- 1986: Lebanon Valley (DC)
- 1987–1999: Lafayette (RB)
- 2000–2016: Lafayette

Head coaching record
- Overall: 84–107
- Tournaments: 0–4 (NCAA D-I-AA/FCS playoffs)

Accomplishments and honors

Championships
- 4 Patriot League (2004–2006, 2013)

Frank Tavani (born July 31, 1953) is an American former college football coach. He served as the head football coach at Lafayette College from 2000 until his retirement in 2016, compiling a record of 84–107.

== Head coaching record ==
Year	Team	Overall	Conference	Standing	Bowl/playoffs
Lafayette Leopards (Patriot League) (2000–2016)
2000	Lafayette	2–9	1–5	T–6th	
2001	Lafayette	2–8	1–6	7th	
2002	Lafayette	7–5	5–2	3rd	
2003	Lafayette	5–6	2–5	6th	
2004	Lafayette	8–4	5–1	T–1st	L NCAA Division I-AA First Round
2005	Lafayette	8–4	5–1	T–1st	L NCAA Division I-AA First Round
2006	Lafayette	6–6	5–1	T–1st	L NCAA Division I First Round
2007	Lafayette	7–4	4–2	T–2nd	
2008	Lafayette	7–4	3–3	4th	
2009	Lafayette	8–3	4–2	T–2nd	
2010	Lafayette	2–9	1–4	T–5th	
2011	Lafayette	4–7	2–4	T–5th	
2012	Lafayette	5–6	2–4	T–3rd	
2013	Lafayette	5–7	4–1	1st	L NCAA Division I First Round
2014	Lafayette	5–6	3–3	T–3rd	
2015	Lafayette	1–10	0–6	7th	
2016	Lafayette	2–9	1–5	6th	
Lafayette:		84–107	48–55		
Total:		84–107			
National championship Conference title Conference division title or championship game berth
