= Wilmer G. Crowell =

American football official (1884–1943)

Biographical details
- Born: January 29, 1884; Philadelphia, Pennsylvania, U.S.
- Died: August 23, 1943 (aged 59); Philadelphia, Pennsylvania, U.S.

Playing career

Football
- 1903–1905: Swarthmore
- Position: Quarterback

Coaching career (HC unless noted)

Football
- 1906: George Washington
- 1907–1908: Swarthmore (assistant)
- 1912–1913: Central Manual HS (PA)
- 1914–1916: Lafayette

Basketball
- 1915–1916: Lafayette

Lacrosse
- 1909–1911: Swarthmore

Administrative career (AD unless noted)
- 1914–1916: Lafayette

Head coaching record
- Overall: 19–15–5

Accomplishments and honors

Awards
- Third-team All-American (1905)

Wilmer Gardner Crowell (January 29, 1884 – August 23, 1943) was an American college football, basketball and lacrosse player and coach. He was a quarterback and drop kicker at Swarthmore. He served as the head football coach at George Washington University in 1906 and at Lafayette College from 1914 to 1916, compiling a career coaching record of 19–15–5. Crowell died on August 23, 1943, at Chestnut Hill Hospital in Philadelphia, Pennsylvania.

Crowell was the head referee during the 1936 NFL Championship Game.

== Head coaching record ==
Year	Team	Overall	Conference	Standing	Bowl/playoffs
George Washington Hatchetites (Independent) (1906)
1906	George Washington	4–3–2			
George Washington:		4–3–2			
Lafayette (Independent) (1914–1916)
1914	Lafayette	5–3–2			
1915	Lafayette	8–3			
1916	Lafayette	2–6–1			
Lafayette:		15–12–3			
Total:		19–15–5			
