= Steve Hokuf =

American football player and coach (1910–2000)

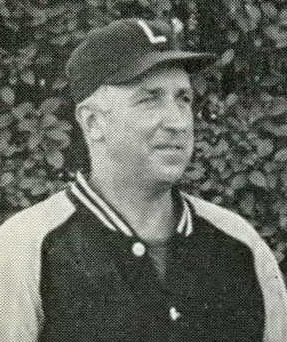
- Hokuf in 1958

Biographical details
- Born: September 26, 1910; Wilber, Nebraska, U.S.
- Died: July 1, 2000 (aged 89); Cockeysville, Maryland, U.S.

Playing career

Football
- 1929–1930: Nebraska
- 1932: Nebraska
- 1933–1935: Boston Redskins

Basketball
- 1929–1931: Nebraska
- 1932–1933: Nebraska
- Positions: Quarterback, fullback, end (football)

Coaching career (HC unless noted)

Football
- 1936: Colorado Mines (line)
- 1937–1941: Wyoming (line)
- 1946: Wyoming (line)
- 1947–1948: Brooklyn Dodgers (line)
- 1950: Columbia (assistant)
- 1951: Pittsburgh (line)
- 1952–1957: Lafayette

Head coaching record
- Overall: 25–27

Accomplishments and honors

Championships
- 2 Middle Three (1954–1955)

Awards
- 2× first-team All-Big Six (1930, 1932); Second-team All-Big Six (1929)

Stephen Melvin Hokuf (September 26, 1910 – July 1, 2000) was an American football player and coach. He played college football for the Nebraska Cornhuskers and professionally in the National Football League (NFL) as a quarterback and fullback for the Boston Redskins from 1933 to 1935. Hokuf served as the head football coach at Lafayette College from 1952 to 1957, compiling a record of 25–27.

Hokuf also competed on the Nebraska basketball team and track and field team, where he was a Big Six Conference champion in the javelin throw.

Prior to his head coaching stint at Lafayette, Hokuf was an assistant football coach at a number of other colleges: Colorado School of Mines, the University of Wyoming, Columbia University and the University of Pittsburgh. He also coached for the Brooklyn Dodgers of the All-America Football Conference from 1947 to 1948. Hokuf earned a master's degree in education at the University of Wyoming and a doctorate in education from Columbia University in 1951. From 1958 to 1979, he worked in the athletic department at Baltimore Junior College—now Baltimore City Community College—serving as athletic director and coach of football and golf.

Hofuk died of a stroke on July 1, 2000, at his home in the Broadmead Retirement Community located in Cockeysville, Maryland.

== Head coaching record ==
| Year | Team | Overall | Conference | Standing | Bowl/playoffs |
|---|---|---|---|---|---|
Lafayette Leopards (Middle Three Conference) (1952–1957)
| 1952 | Lafayette | 0–9 | 0–2 | 3rd | |
| 1953 | Lafayette | 5–4 | 1–1 | 2nd | |
| 1954 | Lafayette | 4–5 | 1–1 | T–1st | |
| 1955 | Lafayette | 6–2 | 2–0 | 1st | |
| 1956 | Lafayette | 6–3 | 0–2 | 3rd | |
| 1957 | Lafayette | 4–4 | 0–2 | 3rd | |
| Lafayette: | | 25–27 | 4–8 | | |
| Total: | | 25–27 | | | |
National championship Conference title Conference division title or championship game berth
