= Ben Wolfson =

American football coach

Playing career
- 1927–1930: East Stroudsburg

Coaching career (HC unless noted)
- 1940: Catasauqua HS (PA)
- 1942: Moravian
- 1943–1945: Lafayette
- 1946: Scranton Miners
- 1947: Wilkes–Barre Barons

Head coaching record
- Overall: 15–12–2 (college)

Accomplishments and honors

Championships
- 2 Middle Three (1943–1944)

Ben Wolfson was an American football coach. He served as the head football coach at Moravian College in Bethlehem, Pennsylvania in 1942 and Lafayette College in Easton, Pennsylvania from 1943 to 1945, compiling a career college football coaching record of 15–12–2.

== Coaching career ==
=== Catasauqua High School ===
Wolfson was the head football coach at Catasauqua High School in Northampton, Pennsylvania in 1940.

=== Moravian College ===
Wolfson served as the head football coach at Moravian College in Bethlehem, Pennsylvania for one season in 1942.

=== Lafayette College ===
When Moravian shut down sports during World War II, Wolfson took the head coaching job at Lafayette College in Easton, Pennsylvania, where he coached for thee seasons from 1943 to 1945.

=== Scranton Miners ===
Wolfson served as the head coach of the Scranton Miners (1946) and Wilkes–Barre Barons (1947) of the American Football League.

== Head coaching record ==
=== College ===
Year	Team	Overall	Conference	Standing	Bowl/playoffs
Moravian Greyhounds (Independent) (1942)
1942	Moravian	4–3–1			
Moravian:		4–3–1			
Lafayette Leopards (Middle Three Conference) (1943–1945)
1943	Lafayette	4–1	3–1	T–1st	
1944	Lafayette	6–1	4–0	1st	
1945	Lafayette	1–7–1	1–1	2nd	
Lafayette:		11–9–1	8–2		
Total:		15–12–1			
