= George McCaa =

American athlete and coach (1884–1960)

Biographical details
- Born: March 8, 1884; Wilkes-Barre, Pennsylvania, U.S.
- Died: November 28, 1960 (aged 76); Pittsburgh, Pennsylvania, U.S.

Playing career

Football
- 1908–1909: Lafayette
- Position: Fullback

Coaching career (HC unless noted)

Football
- 1910: Whitman
- 1911: New Hampshire
- 1912–1913: Lafayette
- 1914–1915: Muhlenberg

Basketball
- 1914–1917: Muhlenberg

Baseball
- 1914–1915: Muhlenberg

Head coaching record
- Overall: 16–27–5 (football); 19–15 (basketball); 9–18 (baseball)

Accomplishments and honors

Awards
- 2× third-team All-American (1908, 1909)

George Shiffer McCaa (March 8, 1884 – November 28, 1960) was an American college football, college basketball, and college baseball player and coach. He played football as a fullback at Lafayette College. McCaa served as the head football coach at Whitman College in 1910, New Hampshire College of Agriculture and the Mechanic Arts—now known as the University of New Hampshire—in 1911, Lafayette College from 1912 to 1913, and Muhlenberg College from 1914 to 1915.

== Biography ==
McCaa was born on March 8, 1884, in Wilkes-Barre, Pennsylvania. He played college football for Lafayette College of Easton, Pennsylvania, as a fullback in 1908 and 1909. He also played basketball and baseball, and ran track.

McCaa served as the head football coach at Whitman College in Walla Walla, Washington, in 1910. He began the 1911 season as head football coach at New Hampshire, but resigned after three games to become supervisor of athletics and assistant football coach at Lafayette. He served as head football coach at Lafayette during 1912 and 1913, and at Muhlenberg College in Allentown, Pennsylvania, during 1914 and 1915.

McCaa died at the age of 76 on November 28, 1960, at Allegheny General Hospital in Pittsburgh.

== Head coaching record ==
=== Football ===
Year	Team	Overall	Conference	Standing	Bowl/playoffs
Whitman Fighting Missionaries (Northwest Conference) (1910)
1910	Whitman	2–4	0–4	6th	
Whitman:		2–4	0–4		
New Hampshire (Independent) (1911)
1911	New Hampshire †	0–2–1			
New Hampshire:		0–2–1			
Lafayette (Independent) (1912–1913)
1912	Lafayette	4–5–1			
1913	Lafayette	4–5–1			
Lafayette:		8–10–2			
Muhlenberg Cardinal and Grey (Independent) (1914–1915)
1914	Muhlenberg	2–6–2			
1915	Muhlenberg	4–5			
Muhlenberg:		6–11–2			
Total:		16–27–5			

† Resigned after 3 games
