= James McConlogue =

American football coach (1914–1967)

Biographical details
- Born: May 12, 1914
- Died: October 28, 1967 (aged 53); Greenville, South Carolina, U.S.

Playing career

Football
- c. 1945: Moravian

Basketball
- c. 1945: Moravian

Coaching career (HC unless noted)

Football
- c. 1950: Netcong HS (NJ)
- c. 1950: Allentown Central Catholic HS (PA)
- 1953–1957: Lafayette (backfield)
- 1958–1962: Lafayette
- 1963: Colorado (assistant)
- 1965–1966: Bethlehem Catholic HS (PA)
- 1967: Lehigh (assistant)

Head coaching record
- Overall: 20–23–2 (college)

James P. McConlogue (May 12, 1914 – October 28, 1967) was an American football coach. He served as the head football coach at Lafayette College from 1958 to 1962, compiling a record of 20–23–2.

McConlogue died on October 28, 1967, in Greenville, South Carolina, after suffering a heart attack while coaching Lehigh against Furman.

== Head coaching record ==
=== College ===
Year	Team	Overall	Conference	Standing	Bowl/playoffs
Lafayette Leopards (Middle Atlantic Conference / Middle Three Conference) (1958–1962)
1958	Lafayette	5–3–1	5–1–1 / 0–1–1	2nd (University) / T–2nd	
1959	Lafayette	5–4	4–3 / 1–1	3rd (University) / 2nd	
1960	Lafayette	5–4	4–3 / 0–2	4th (University) / 3rd	
1961	Lafayette	2–6–1	1–5–1 / 0–2	7th (University) / 3rd	
1962	Lafayette	3–6	2–4 / 0–2	T–5th (University) / 3rd	
Lafayette:		20–23–2	16–16–2		
Total:		20–23–2			
