= Kenneth Bunn =

American football player and coach (1928–2009)

Biographical details
- Born: 1928
- Died: March 12, 2009 (aged 80–81)

Playing career
- 1949–1950: Penn State

Coaching career (HC unless noted)
- 1956–1962: Juniata
- 1963–1966: Lafayette

Accomplishments and honors

Championships
- 1 Middle Three (1965); 1 MAC Northern College Division (1958)

Kenneth B. Bunn Jr. (1928 – March 12, 2009) was an American football player and coach. He served as the head football coach at Juniata College from 1956 to 1962 and at Lafayette College from 1963 to 1966. Bunn played college football at Pennsylvania State University, where he lettered in 1949 and 1950.

== Head coaching record ==
=== Football ===
Year	Team	Overall	Conference	Standing	Bowl/playoffs
Juniata Indians (Independent) (1956–1962)
1956	Juniata	6–1			
1957	Juniata	7–0			
Juniata Indians (Middle Atlantic Conference) (1958–1962)
1958	Juniata	7–0–1	6–0	1st (Northern College)	
1959	Juniata	7–1	5–1	T–2nd (Northern College)	
1960	Juniata	5–2	4–1	5th (Northern College)	
1961	Juniata	3–4	1–2	NA (Northern College)	
1962	Juniata	6–2	2–1	NA (Northern College)	
Juniata:		41–10–1	18–5		
Lafayette Leopards (Middle Atlantic Conference / Middle Three Conference) (1963–1966)
1963	Lafayette	1–8	1–4 / 0–2	6th (University) / 3rd	
1964	Lafayette	0–7–2	0–4–2 / 0–1–1	5th (University) / T–2nd	
1965	Lafayette	3–7	1–5 / 1–1	6th (University) / T–1st	
1966	Lafayette	3–6	2–3 / 1–1	T–4th (University) / 2nd	
Bucknell:		7–28–2	4–20–2		
Total:		48–38–3			
National championship Conference title Conference division title or championship game berth
