= Samuel B. Newton =

American football player and coach (1868–1932)

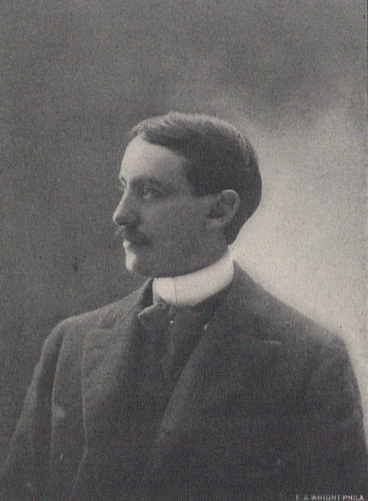
- Newton pictured in La Vie 1900, Penn State yearbook

Biographical details
- Born: December 4, 1868; Yarmouth, Maine, U.S.
- Died: April 30, 1932 (aged 63); Chevy Chase, Maryland, U.S.

Playing career
- 1893: Penn
- Position: End

Coaching career (HC unless noted)
- 1896–1898: Penn State
- 1898–1901: Lafayette
- 1902–1905: Lehigh
- 1907: Williams
- 1909–1910: Williams
- 1911: Lafayette

Head coaching record
- Overall: 83–58–5

Sylvanus Blanchard "Samuel" Newton (Note: Newton's name is spelled "Sylvanus" on his birth certificate, though it has been spelled "Silvanus" alternatively, notably on his gravestone and passport application forms. Other alternate spellings include "Sylvanous" and "Sylvanos".) (December 4, 1868 (Note: Newton's birth certificate states that he was born in 1868, but passport application forms state his year of birth as 1872.) – April 30, 1932) was an American college football player and coach. He served as the head football coach at Pennsylvania State University (1896–1898), Lafayette College (1899–1901, 1911), Lehigh University (1902–1905), and Williams College (1907, 1909–1910), compiling a career coaching record of 83–58–5.

== Coaching career ==
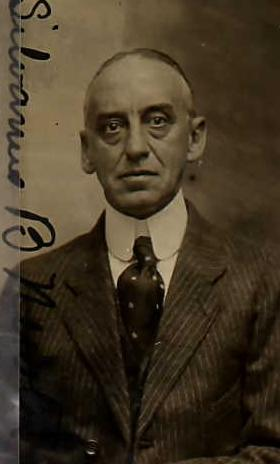
Newton in 1919

=== Penn State ===
Newton was the head football coach at Pennsylvania State University from 1896 to 1898. His record at Penn State was 12–14.

=== Lafayette ===
Newton coached at Lafayette College for five seasons and achieved a record of 36–16. His first season was arguably his best, as his team outscored its opponents by 253 to 23 and achieved a record of 12–1. The team's only loss was to Princeton by a score of 12–0.

=== Lehigh ===
Newton was the tenth head football coach at Lehigh University and he held that position for four seasons, from 1902 until 1905. His overall record at Lehigh was 23–20–2. While coaching at Lafayette, Newton's teams won The Rivalry game against Lehigh all seven times in three seasons. Newton later moved to Lehigh to coach on the opposite side of The Rivalry, winning two of four games played.

== Death ==
Newton died on April 30, 1932, of a throat infection at his home in Chevy Chase, Maryland. He is interred at Arlington National Cemetery in Arlington, Virginia.

== Head coaching record ==
Year	Team	Overall	Conference	Standing	Bowl/playoffs
Penn State (Independent) (1896–1898)
1896	Penn State	3–4			
1897	Penn State	3–6			
1898	Penn State	6–4			
Penn State:		12–14			
Lafayette (Independent) (1898–1901)
1898	Lafayette	3–8			
1899	Lafayette	12–1			
1900	Lafayette	9–2			
1901	Lafayette	9–3			
Lehigh Brown and White (Independent) (1902–1905)
1902	Lehigh	7–3–1			
1903	Lehigh	9–2–1			
1904	Lehigh	1–8			
1905	Lehigh	6–7			
Lehigh:		23–20–2			
Williams Ephs (Independent) (1907)
1907	Williams	6–3			
Williams Ephs (Independent) (1909–1910)
1909	Williams	5–2			
1910	Williams	1–3–3			
Williams:		12–8–3			
Lafayette (Independent) (1911)
1911	Lafayette	3–2			
Lafayette:		36–16			
Total:		83–58–5			
