= John Troxell =

American football player and coach

Current position
- Title: Head coach
- Team: Lafayette
- Conference: Patriot
- Record: 30–24

Biographical details
- Born: 1971/1972 (age 54–55)

Playing career
- 1990–1993: Lafayette
- Position: Free safety

Coaching career (HC unless noted)
- 1994–1996: Columbia (DB)
- 1997–1999: Muhlenberg (ST/QB/WR)
- 2000: Muhlenberg (OC/QB/WR)
- 2001–2005: Lafayette (ST/RB)
- 2006–2021: Franklin & Marshall
- 2022–present: Lafayette

Head coaching record
- Overall: 122–92
- Bowls: 6–3
- Tournaments: 0–1

Accomplishments and honors

Championships
- 1 Centennial (2017); 1 Patriot League (2023)

Awards
- 2× Centennial Coach of the Year (2009, 2017); 1 Patriot League Coach of the Year (2023)

John Troxell (born 1972) is an American college football coach and former player. He is the head football coach at Lafayette College in Easton, Pennsylvania, a position to which he was hired in December 2021. Troxell served as the head football coach at Franklin & Marshall College in Lancaster, Pennsylvania from 2006 to 2021.

== Head coaching record ==
Year	Team	Overall	Conference	Standing	Bowl/playoffs
Franklin & Marshall Diplomats (Centennial Conference) (2006–2021)
2006	Franklin & Marshall	3–7	2–4	T–5th	
2007	Franklin & Marshall	4–6	4–4	T–5th	
2008	Franklin & Marshall	4–6	3–5	6th	
2009	Franklin & Marshall	9–2	6–2	T–2nd	W South Atlantic
2010	Franklin & Marshall	6–5	5–4	T–5th	L Southwest
2011	Franklin & Marshall	3–7	3–6	7th	
2012	Franklin & Marshall	7–4	6–3	T–3rd	L Southeast
2013	Franklin & Marshall	7–4	6–3	T–3rd	W Southeast
2014	Franklin & Marshall	5–5	4–5	T–5th	
2015	Franklin & Marshall	6–4	5–4	5th	
2016	Franklin & Marshall	7–4	6–3	T–3rd	L Centennial–MAC Bowl
2017	Franklin & Marshall	10–1	8–1	T–1st	W Centennial–MAC Bowl
2018	Franklin & Marshall	8–3	6–3	T–3rd	W Centennial–MAC Bowl
2019	Franklin & Marshall	7–4	5–4	4th	W Centennial–MAC Bowl
2020–21	No team—COVID-19				
2021	Franklin & Marshall	6–5	5–4	5th	W Centennial–MAC Bowl
Franklin & Marshall:		92–67	74–55		
Lafayette Leopards (Patriot League) (2022–present)
2022	Lafayette	4–7	3–3	3rd	
2023	Lafayette	9–3	5–1	T–1st	L NCAA Division I First Round
2024	Lafayette	6–6	2–4	T–4th	
2025	Lafayette	8–4	6–1	2nd	
2026	Lafayette	3–4	2–2		
Lafayette:		30–24	18–11		
Total:		122–91			
National championship Conference title Conference division title or championship game berth
