= Bill Russo (American football) =

American football coach (1947–2021)

Biographical details
- Born: June 19, 1947; New York, New York, U.S.
- Died: September 29, 2021 (aged 74); Asheville, North Carolina, U.S.
- Education: Brown University

Coaching career (HC unless noted)
- 1969–1977: Brown (assistant)
- 1978–1980: Wagner
- 1981–1999: Lafayette

Head coaching record
- Overall: 118–113–4
- Tournaments: 0–1 (NCAA D-III playoffs)

Accomplishments and honors

Championships
- 3 Patriot (1988, 1992, 1994)

Awards
- Eddie Robinson Award (1988); ECAC Coach of the Year (1981); AFCA Kodak Coach of the Year (1981)

William John Russo (June 19, 1947 – September 29, 2021) was an American college football coach. He served as the head football at Wagner College from 1978 to 1980 and at Lafayette College from 1981 to 1999. In 23 seasons as a head coach, Russo compiled a 118–113–4 overall record. In 1988, 1992 and 1994 Russo coached the Lafayette Leopards to outright Patriot League conference titles. Russo received the Eddie Robinson Award in 1988, which is given annually to the nation's top coach in NCAA Division I Football Championship Subdivision (formerly Division I-AA). Russo's 103 wins at Lafayette are the most of any head coach in the program's history.

Russo is most notable for comforting a crying Lafayette football player after the loss to Lehigh during the 1998 Rivalry game.

== Head coaching record ==
Year	Team	Overall	Conference	Standing	Bowl/playoffs	NCAA^{#}
Wagner Seahawks (NCAA Division III independent) (1978–1980)
1978	Wagner	2–8				
1979	Wagner	5–5				
1980	Wagner	8–2			L NCAA Division III Quarterfinal	
Wagner:		15–15				
Lafayette Leopards (NCAA Division I-AA independent) (1981–1985)
1981	Lafayette	9–2				8
1982	Lafayette	7–3				20
1983	Lafayette	6–5				
1984	Lafayette	5–5				
1985	Lafayette	6–5				
Lafayette Leopards (Patriot League) (1986–1999)
1986	Lafayette	6–5	2–2	T–2nd		
1987	Lafayette	4–7	2–3	4th		
1988	Lafayette	8–2–1	5–0	1st		
1989	Lafayette	5–5	2–2	T–2nd		
1990	Lafayette	4–7	1–4	5th		
1991	Lafayette	6–5	3–2	T–2nd		
1992	Lafayette	8–3	5–0	1st		
1993	Lafayette	5–4–2	3–1–1	2nd		
1994	Lafayette	5–6	5–0	1st		
1995	Lafayette	4–6–1	3–2	3rd		
1996	Lafayette	5–5	2–2	4th		
1997	Lafayette	3–8	2–4	T–4th		
1998	Lafayette	3–8	3–3	T–3rd		
1999	Lafayette	4–7	2–4	T–5th		
Lafayette:		103–98–4	40–29–1			
Total:		118–113–4				
National championship Conference title Conference division title or championship game berth
^{#}Rankings from final NCAA Poll.
