= Pearl T. Haskell =

American football coach, physician, and politician

Biographical details
- Born: March 10, 1868; Deering, Maine, U.S.
- Died: April 13, 1919 (aged 51); Bangor, Maine, U.S.
- Education: Medical School of Maine (1893)

Coaching career (HC unless noted)
- 1891: Bowdoin

Pearl Tenney Haskell (March 10, 1868 – April 13, 1919) was an American physician, politician, and college football coach. He served as the head football coach at Bowdoin College in Brunswick, Maine in 1891 where he was a medical student.

Haskell attended Phillips Academy in Andover, Massachusetts and then studied at the Sheffield Scientific School at Yale University for a year. He graduated from Bowdoin's Medical School of Maine in 1893. He practice medicine in Union, Sanbornville, and Concord, New Hampshire.

Haskell was a member of the New Hampshire House of Representatives from 1911 to 1913. He was the superintendent of the Maine State Hospital in Bangor, Maine for five years until his death on April 13, 1919. He was found dead from accidental gasoline asphyxiation, in his home's garage in Bangor.
