= H. H. Vincent (American football) =

American football player and coach (1867–1935)

Biographical details
- Born: January 10, 1867
- Died: August 6, 1935 (aged 68); Danville, Pennsylvania, U.S.

Playing career
- 1892: Princeton
- Position: End

Coaching career (HC unless noted)
- 1893–1894: Lafayette

Head coaching record
- Overall: 8–12

Henry H. Vincent (January 10, 1867 – August 6, 1935) was an American college football player and coach. He served as the co-head football coach at Lafayette College in Easton, Pennsylvania during the 1893 and 1894 seasons, compiling a record of 8–12. Vincent played college football at Princeton University in Princeton, New Jersey in 1892. His first foray into coaching occurred midway through the 1893 season when he gave pointers to the 1893 while visiting his brother in Pennsylvania.

A native of Danville, Pennsylvania, Vincent graduated from New York Law School in 1894. He was admitted to the bar in New York, but never practice law, instead working in the lumber business. Vincent died on August 6, 1935, at Geisinger Memorial Hospital in Danville.

== Head coaching record ==
Year	Team	Overall	Conference	Standing	Bowl/playoffs
Lafayette (Independent) (1893–1894)
1893	Lafayette	3–6			
1894	Lafayette	5–6			
Lafayette:		8–12			
Total:		8–12			
