= List of Patriot League football standings =

This is a list of yearly Patriot League football standings.

== Patriot League standings ==
1986 Colonial League football standings
	Conf.					Overall
Team	W		L		T	W		L		T
No. 5 Holy Cross $	4	–	0	–	0	10	–	1	–	0
Lafayette	2	–	2	–	0	6	–	5	–	0
Lehigh	2	–	2	–	0	5	–	6	–	0
Colgate	1	–	3	–	0	4	–	7	–	0
Bucknell	1	–	3	–	0	3	–	7	–	0
$ – Conference champion; Rankings from NCAA Division I-AA Football Committee poll

1987 Colonial League football standings
	Conf.					Overall
Team	W		L		T	W		L		T
No. 1 Holy Cross $	4	–	0	–	0	11	–	0	–	0
Lehigh	3	–	1	–	1	5	–	5	–	1
Colgate	2	–	2	–	0	7	–	4	–	0
Lafayette	2	–	3	–	0	4	–	7	–	0
Bucknell	1	–	3	–	1	4	–	5	–	1
Davidson	0	–	3	–	0	1	–	10	–	0
$ – Conference champion; Rankings from NCAA Division I-AA Football Committee poll

1988 Colonial League football standings
	Conf.					Overall
Team	W		L		T	W		L		T
Lafayette $	5	–	0	–	0	8	–	2	–	1
No. 19 Holy Cross	3	–	1	–	0	9	–	2	–	0
Lehigh	2	–	3	–	0	6	–	5	–	0
Bucknell	2	–	3	–	0	3	–	7	–	0
Colgate	2	–	3	–	0	2	–	9	–	0
Davidson	0	–	4	–	0	0	–	10	–	0
$ – Conference champion; Rankings from NCAA Division I-AA Football Committee poll

1989 Colonial League football standings
	Conf.					Overall
Team	W		L		T	W		L		T
No. T–4 Holy Cross $	4	–	0	–	0	10	–	1	–	0
Bucknell	2	–	2	–	0	5	–	5	–	0
Lafayette	2	–	2	–	0	5	–	5	–	0
Lehigh	1	–	3	–	0	5	–	6	–	0
Colgate	1	–	3	–	0	4	–	7	–	0
$ – Conference champion; Rankings from NCAA Division I-AA Football Committee poll

1990 Patriot League football standings
	Conf.					Overall
Team	W		L		T	W		L		T
No. 8 Holy Cross $	5	–	0	–	0	9	–	1	–	1
Bucknell	3	–	2	–	0	7	–	4	–	0
Colgate	3	–	2	–	0	7	–	4	–	0
Lehigh	3	–	2	–	0	7	–	4	–	0
Lafayette	1	–	4	–	0	4	–	7	–	0
Fordham	0	–	5	–	0	1	–	9	–	0
$ – Conference champion; Rankings from NCAA Division I-AA Football Committee poll

1991 Patriot League football standings
	Conf.					Overall
Team	W		L		T	W		L		T
No. 3 Holy Cross $	5	–	0	–	0	11	–	0	–	0
Lehigh	3	–	2	–	0	9	–	2	–	0
Lafayette	3	–	2	–	0	6	–	5	–	0
Colgate	3	–	2	–	0	4	–	7	–	0
Bucknell	1	–	4	–	0	1	–	9	–	0
Fordham	0	–	5	–	0	2	–	8	–	0
$ – Conference champion; Rankings from NCAA Division I-AA Football Committee poll

1992 Patriot League football standings
	Conf.					Overall
Team	W		L		T	W		L		T
Lafayette $	5	–	0	–	0	8	–	3	–	0
Holy Cross	4	–	1	–	0	6	–	5	–	0
Colgate	2	–	3	–	0	4	–	7	–	0
Lehigh	2	–	3	–	0	3	–	8	–	0
Bucknell	1	–	4	–	0	4	–	7	–	0
Fordham	1	–	4	–	0	1	–	9	–	0
$ – Conference champion

1993 Patriot League football standings
	Conf.					Overall
Team	W		L		T	W		L		T
Lehigh $	4	–	1	–	0	7	–	4	–	0
Lafayette	3	–	1	–	1	5	–	4	–	2
Bucknell	3	–	2	–	0	4	–	7	–	0
Holy Cross	2	–	3	–	0	3	–	8	–	0
Colgate	1	–	3	–	1	3	–	7	–	1
Fordham	1	–	4	–	0	1	–	10	–	0
$ – Conference champion

1994 Patriot League football standings
	Conf.					Overall
Team	W		L		T	W		L		T
Lafayette $	5	–	0	–	0	5	–	6	–	0
Lehigh	3	–	2	–	0	5	–	5	–	1
Holy Cross	3	–	2	–	0	3	–	8	–	0
Bucknell	2	–	3	–	0	5	–	6	–	0
Colgate	2	–	3	–	0	3	–	8	–	0
Fordham	0	–	5	–	0	0	–	11	–	0
$ – Conference champion

1995 Patriot League football standings
	Conf.					Overall
Team	W		L		T	W		L		T
Lehigh $	5	–	0	–	0	8	–	3	–	0
Bucknell	4	–	1	–	0	7	–	4	–	0
Lafayette	3	–	2	–	0	4	–	6	–	1
Fordham	2	–	3	–	0	4	–	6	–	1
Holy Cross	1	–	4	–	0	2	–	9	–	0
Colgate	0	–	5	–	0	0	–	11	–	0
$ – Conference champion

1996 Patriot League football standings
	Conf.			Overall
Team	W		L	W		L
Bucknell $	4	–	1	6	–	5
Colgate	3	–	2	6	–	5
Lehigh	3	–	2	5	–	6
Lafayette	2	–	2	5	–	5
Fordham	1	–	3	2	–	8
Holy Cross	1	–	4	2	–	9
$ – Conference champion

1997 Patriot League football standings
	Conf.			Overall
Team	W		L	W		L
Colgate $^	6	–	0	7	–	5
No. 24 Bucknell	5	–	1	10	–	1
Fordham	4	–	2	5	–	6
Holy Cross	2	–	4	4	–	7
Lehigh	2	–	4	4	–	7
Lafayette	2	–	4	3	–	8
Towson	0	–	6	2	–	8
$ – Conference champion; ^ – NCAA Division I-AA playoff participant; Rankings from The Sports Network poll

1998 Patriot League football standings
	Conf.			Overall
Team	W		L	W		L
No. 7 Lehigh $^	6	–	0	12	–	1
No. 21 Colgate ^	5	–	1	8	–	4
Bucknell	3	–	3	6	–	5
Lafayette	3	–	3	3	–	8
Fordham	2	–	4	4	–	7
Towson	1	–	5	5	–	6
Holy Cross	1	–	5	2	–	9
$ – Conference champion; ^ – NCAA Division I-AA playoff participant; Rankings from The Sports Network poll

1999 Patriot League football standings
	Conf.			Overall
Team	W		L	W		L
No. 14 Lehigh +^	5	–	1	10	–	2
No. 18 Colgate +^	5	–	1	10	–	2
Towson	4	–	2	7	–	4
Bucknell	3	–	3	7	–	4
Lafayette	2	–	4	4	–	7
Holy Cross	2	–	4	3	–	8
Fordham	0	–	6	0	–	11
+ – Conference co-champions; ^ – NCAA Division I-AA playoff participant; Rankings from The Sports Network poll

2000 Patriot League football standings
	Conf.			Overall
Team	W		L	W		L
No. 8 Lehigh $^	6	–	0	12	–	1
Colgate	4	–	2	7	–	4
Holy Cross	4	–	2	7	–	4
Towson	3	–	3	7	–	4
Bucknell	2	–	4	6	–	5
Fordham	1	–	5	3	–	8
Lafayette	1	–	5	2	–	9
$ – Conference champion; ^ – NCAA Division I-AA playoff participant; Rankings from The Sports Network poll

2001 Patriot League football standings
	Conf.			Overall
Team	W		L	W		L
No. 5 Lehigh $^	7	–	0	11	–	1
Colgate	5	–	1	7	–	3
Fordham	5	–	2	7	–	4
Bucknell	4	–	3	6	–	4
Holy Cross	3	–	4	4	–	6
Towson	2	–	5	3	–	7
Lafayette	1	–	6	2	–	8
Georgetown	0	–	6	3	–	7
$ – Conference champion; ^ – NCAA Division I-AA playoff participant; Rankings from The Sports Network poll

2002 Patriot League football standings
	Conf.			Overall
Team	W		L	W		L
No. 12 Fordham +^	6	–	1	10	–	3
No. 25 Colgate +	6	–	1	9	–	3
Lafayette	5	–	2	7	–	5
Lehigh	4	–	3	8	–	4
Towson	3	–	4	6	–	5
Georgetown	2	–	5	5	–	6
Holy Cross	2	–	5	4	–	8
Bucknell	0	–	7	2	–	9
+ – Conference co-champions; ^ – NCAA Division I-AA playoff participant; Rankings from The Sports Network poll

2003 Patriot League football standings
	Conf.			Overall
Team	W		L	W		L
No. 2 Colgate $^	7	–	0	15	–	1
No. 23 Lehigh	6	–	1	8	–	3
Fordham	4	–	3	9	–	3
Bucknell	4	–	3	6	–	6
Towson	3	–	4	6	–	6
Lafayette	2	–	5	5	–	6
Georgetown	1	–	6	4	–	8
Holy Cross	1	–	6	1	–	11
$ – Conference champion; ^ – NCAA Division I-AA playoff participant; Rankings from The Sports Network poll

2004 Patriot League football standings
	Conf.			Overall
Team	W		L	W		L
No. 15 Lehigh +^	5	–	1	9	–	3
No. 19 Lafayette +^	5	–	1	8	–	4
Bucknell	4	–	2	7	–	4
Colgate	4	–	2	7	–	4
Fordham	2	–	4	5	–	6
Holy Cross	1	–	5	3	–	8
Georgetown	0	–	6	3	–	8
+ – Conference co-champions; ^ – NCAA Division I-AA playoff participant; Rankings from The Sports Network poll

2005 Patriot League football standings
	Conf.			Overall
Team	W		L	W		L
No. 21 Lafayette +^	5	–	1	8	–	4
No. 23 Colgate +^	5	–	1	8	–	4
Lehigh	4	–	2	8	–	3
Holy Cross	3	–	3	6	–	5
Georgetown	2	–	4	4	–	7
Fordham	2	–	4	2	–	9
Bucknell	0	–	6	1	–	10
+ – Conference co-champions; ^ – NCAA Division I-AA playoff participant; Rankings from The Sports Network poll

2006 Patriot League football standings
	Conf.			Overall
Team	W		L	W		L
Lafayette +^	5	–	1	6	–	6
Lehigh +	5	–	1	6	–	5
Holy Cross	4	–	2	7	–	4
Bucknell	3	–	3	6	–	5
Colgate	3	–	3	4	–	7
Fordham	1	–	5	3	–	8
Georgetown	0	–	6	2	–	9
+ – Conference co-champions; ^ – FCS playoff participant; Rankings from The Sports Network poll

2007 Patriot League football standings
	Conf.			Overall
Team	W		L	W		L
No. 20 Fordham $^	5	–	1	8	–	4
Colgate	4	–	2	7	–	4
Holy Cross	4	–	2	7	–	4
Lafayette	4	–	2	7	–	4
Lehigh	2	–	4	5	–	6
Bucknell	1	–	5	3	–	8
Georgetown	1	–	5	1	–	10
$ – Conference champion; ^ – FCS playoff participant; Rankings from The Sports Network poll

2008 Patriot League football standings
	Conf.			Overall
Team	W		L	W		L
No. 16 Colgate $^	5	–	0	9	–	3
Holy Cross	5	–	1	7	–	4
Lehigh	4	–	2	5	–	6
Lafayette	3	–	3	7	–	4
Bucknell	2	–	4	5	–	6
Fordham	1	–	5	5	–	6
Georgetown	0	–	5	2	–	8
$ – Conference champion; ^ – FCS playoff participant; Rankings from The Sports Network poll

2009 Patriot League football standings
	Conf.			Overall
Team	W		L	W		L
No. 14 Holy Cross $^	5	–	1	9	–	3
No. 21 Colgate	4	–	2	9	–	2
No. 24 Lafayette	4	–	2	8	–	3
Lehigh	4	–	2	4	–	7
Fordham	2	–	4	5	–	6
Bucknell	2	–	4	4	–	7
Georgetown	0	–	6	0	–	11
$ – Conference champion; ^ – FCS playoff participant; Rankings from The Sports Network poll

2010 Patriot League football standings
	Conf.			Overall
Team	W		L	W		L
No. 14 Lehigh $^	5	–	0	10	–	3
Colgate	3	–	2	7	–	4
Holy Cross	3	–	2	6	–	5
Georgetown	2	–	3	4	–	7
Lafayette	1	–	4	2	–	9
Bucknell	1	–	4	1	–	10
Fordham	0	–	0	5	–	6
$ – Conference champion; ^ – FCS playoff participant; Rankings from The Sports Network poll

2011 Patriot League football standings
	Conf.			Overall
Team	W		L	W		L
No. 6 Lehigh $^	6	–	0	11	–	2
Georgetown	4	–	2	8	–	3
Holy Cross	4	–	2	6	–	5
Bucknell	3	–	3	6	–	5
Colgate	2	–	4	5	–	6
Lafayette	2	–	4	4	–	7
Fordham	0	–	6	1	–	10
$ – Conference champion; ^ – FCS playoff participant; Fordham was ineligible for conference title because they offered football scholarships while other Patriot League members did not.; Rankings from The Sports Network poll

2012 Patriot League football standings
	Conf.			Overall
Team	W		L	W		L
No. 24 Colgate $^	6	–	0	8	–	4
No. 13 Lehigh	5	–	1	10	–	1
Georgetown	2	–	4	5	–	6
Lafayette	2	–	4	5	–	6
Holy Cross	2	–	4	2	–	9
Bucknell	1	–	5	3	–	8
Fordham	0	–	0	6	–	5
$ – Conference champion; ^ – FCS playoff participant; Fordham was ineligible for conference title because they offered football scholarships while other Patriot League members did not.; Rankings from The Sports Network poll

2013 Patriot League football standings
	Conf.			Overall
Team	W		L	W		L
Lafayette $^	4	–	1	5	–	7
Lehigh	3	–	2	8	–	3
Bucknell	3	–	2	6	–	5
Colgate	3	–	2	4	–	8
Holy Cross	1	–	4	3	–	9
Georgetown	1	–	4	2	–	9
No. 9 Fordham ^	0	–	0	12	–	2
$ – Conference champion; ^ – FCS playoff participant; Fordham was ineligible for conference title because they previously offered football scholarships while other Patriot League members did not.; Rankings from The Sports Network poll

2014 Patriot League football standings
	Conf.			Overall
Team	W		L	W		L
No. 11 Fordham $^	6	–	0	11	–	3
Bucknell	4	–	2	8	–	3
Lafayette	3	–	3	5	–	6
Colgate	3	–	3	5	–	7
Holy Cross	2	–	4	4	–	8
Lehigh	2	–	4	3	–	8
Georgetown	1	–	5	3	–	8
$ – Conference champion; ^ – FCS playoff participant; Rankings from The Sports Network poll

2015 Patriot League football standings
	Conf.			Overall
Team	W		L	W		L
No. 17 Colgate $^	6	–	0	9	–	5
No. 19 Fordham ^	5	–	1	9	–	3
Lehigh	4	–	2	6	–	5
Holy Cross	3	–	3	6	–	5
Georgetown	2	–	4	4	–	7
Bucknell	1	–	5	4	–	7
Lafayette	0	–	6	1	–	10
$ – Conference champion; ^ – FCS playoff participant; Rankings from STATS Poll

2016 Patriot League football standings
	Conf.			Overall
Team	W		L	W		L
No. 21 Lehigh $^	6	–	0	9	–	3
Fordham	5	–	1	8	–	3
Colgate	4	–	2	5	–	5
Bucknell	3	–	3	4	–	7
Holy Cross	2	–	4	4	–	7
Lafayette	1	–	5	2	–	9
Georgetown	0	–	6	3	–	8
$ – Conference champion; ^ – FCS playoff participant; Rankings from STATS Poll

2017 Patriot League football standings
	Conf.			Overall
Team	W		L	W		L
Colgate +	5	–	1	7	–	4
Lehigh +^	5	–	1	5	–	7
Holy Cross	3	–	3	4	–	7
Fordham	3	–	3	4	–	7
Lafayette	3	–	3	3	–	8
Bucknell	2	–	4	5	–	6
Georgetown	0	–	6	1	–	10
+ – Conference co-champions; ^ – FCS playoff participant

2018 Patriot League football standings
	Conf.			Overall
Team	W		L	W		L
No. 8 Colgate $^	6	–	0	10	–	2
Holy Cross	4	–	2	5	–	6
Georgetown	4	–	2	5	–	6
Lehigh	2	–	4	3	–	8
Lafayette	2	–	4	3	–	8
Fordham	2	–	4	2	–	9
Bucknell	1	–	5	1	–	10
$ – Conference champion; ^ – FCS playoff participant; Rankings from STATS Poll

2019 Patriot League football standings
	Conf.			Overall
Team	W		L	W		L
Holy Cross $^	5	–	1	7	–	5
Lafayette	4	–	2	4	–	8
Bucknell	3	–	3	3	–	8
Lehigh	3	–	3	4	–	7
Colgate	3	–	3	4	–	8
Fordham	2	–	4	4	–	8
Georgetown	1	–	5	5	–	6
$ – Conference champion; ^ – FCS playoff participant

2020 Patriot League football standings
	Conf.			Overall
Team	W		L	W		L
North Division
Holy Cross $^	2	–	0	3	–	1
Fordham	2	–	1	2	–	1
Colgate	0	–	2	0	–	2
South Division
Bucknell	2	–	1	2	–	2
Lafayette	2	–	1	2	–	1
Lehigh	0	–	3	0	–	3
Championship: Holy Cross 33, Bucknell 10
$ – Conference champion; ^ – FCS playoff participant; Notes: Due to COVID-19, the Patriot League suspended the fall 2020 football season. Georgetown opted out of the spring football season.; Rankings from STATS Poll

2021 Patriot League football standings
	Conf.			Overall
Team	W		L	W		L
No. 19 Holy Cross $^	6	–	0	10	–	3
Colgate	5	–	1	5	–	6
Fordham	4	–	2	6	–	5
Lehigh	3	–	3	3	–	8
Lafayette	2	–	4	3	–	8
Georgetown	1	–	5	2	–	8
Bucknell	0	–	6	1	–	10
$ – Conference champion; ^ – FCS playoff participant; Rankings from STATS Poll

2022 Patriot League football standings
	Conf.			Overall
Team	W		L	W		L
No. 6 Holy Cross $^	6	–	0	12	–	1
No. 22 Fordham ^	5	–	1	9	–	3
Lafayette	3	–	3	4	–	7
Bucknell	2	–	4	3	–	8
Colgate	2	–	4	3	–	8
Lehigh	2	–	4	2	–	9
Georgetown	1	–	5	2	–	9
$ – Conference champion; ^ – FCS playoff participant; Rankings from STATS Poll

2023 Patriot League football standings
	Conf.			Overall
Team	W		L	W		L
No. 21 Lafayette +^	5	–	1	9	–	3
Holy Cross +	5	–	1	7	–	4
Colgate	4	–	2	6	–	5
Georgetown	3	–	3	5	–	6
Fordham	2	–	4	6	–	5
Lehigh	1	–	5	2	–	9
Bucknell	1	–	5	4	–	7
+ – Conference co-champions; ^ – FCS playoff participant; Rankings from STATS Poll

2024 Patriot League football standings
	Conf.			Overall
Team	W		L	W		L
No. 20 Lehigh +^	5	–	1	9	–	4
Holy Cross +	5	–	1	6	–	6
Bucknell	4	–	2	6	–	6
Lafayette	2	–	4	6	–	6
Georgetown	2	–	4	5	–	6
Fordham	2	–	4	2	–	10
Colgate	1	–	5	2	–	10
+ – Conference co-champions; ^ – FCS playoff participant; Rankings from STATS Poll

2025 Patriot League football standings
	Conf.			Overall
Team	W		L	W		L
Bucknell	0	–	0	0	–	0
Colgate	0	–	0	0	–	0
Fordham	0	–	0	0	–	0
Georgetown	0	–	0	0	–	0
Holy Cross	0	–	0	0	–	0
Lafayette	0	–	0	0	–	0
No. 14 Lehigh	0	–	0	0	–	0
No. 25 Richmond	0	–	0	0	–	0
As of August 25, 2025; Rankings from STATS Poll
