= 2001 Princeton Tigers football team =

American college football season

2001 Princeton Tigers football
- Conference: Ivy League
- Record: 3–6 (3–5 Ivy)
- Head coach: Roger Hughes (2nd season)
- Captain: Robert Farrell
- Home stadium: Princeton Stadium

2001 Ivy League football standings
	Conf.			Overall
Team	W		L	W		L
No. 19 Harvard $	7	–	0	9	–	0
No. 24 Penn	6	–	1	8	–	1
Brown	5	–	2	6	–	3
Princeton	3	–	4	3	–	6
Columbia	3	–	4	3	–	7
Cornell	2	–	5	2	–	7
Dartmouth	1	–	6	1	–	8
Yale	1	–	6	3	–	6
$ – Conference champion; Rankings from The Sports Network poll

The 2001 Princeton Tigers football team represented Princeton University in the 2001 NCAA Division I-AA football season. The team was coached by Roger Hughes and played its home games at Princeton Stadium in Princeton, New Jersey. The Tigers tied for fourth in the Ivy League.

Like most of the Ivy League, Princeton played nine games instead of the usual 10, after the school made the decision to cancel its September 15 season opener against Lafayette, following the September 11 attacks.

== Schedule ==
Date	Opponent	Site	Result	Attendance	Source
September 15	Lafayette*	Princeton Stadium; Princeton, NJ	Canceled		
September 22	at No. 10 Lehigh*	Goodman Stadium; Bethlehem, PA	L 10–34	10,893	
September 29	Columbia	Princeton Stadium; Princeton, NJ	W 44–11	13,559	
October 6	Colgate*	Princeton Stadium; Princeton, NJ	L 10–35	12,304	
October 13	at Brown	Brown Stadium; Providence, RI	L 24–35	12,673	
October 20	at Harvard	Harvard Stadium; Boston, MA (rivalry)	L 26–28	9,326	
October 27	Cornell	Princeton Stadium; Princeton, NJ	L 7–10	11,685	
November 3	at No. 18 Penn	Franklin Field; Philadelphia, PA (rivalry)	L 10–21	18,810	
November 10	Yale	Princeton Stadium; Princeton, NJ (rivalry)	W 34–14	20,129	
November 17	at Dartmouth	Memorial Field; Hanover, NH	W 35–14	2,417	
*Non-conference game; Rankings from The Sports Network Poll released prior to the game
