= 2001 Cornell Big Red football team =

American college football season

2001 Cornell Big Red football
- Conference: Ivy League
- Record: 2–7 (2–5 Ivy)
- Head coach: Tim Pendergast (1st season)
- Offensive coordinator: John Strollo (1st season)
- Defensive coordinator: Jim Pletcher (1st season)
- Captains: Justin Dunleavy; Ricky Rahne; Nate Spitler
- Home stadium: Schoellkopf Field

2001 Ivy League football standings
	Conf.			Overall
Team	W		L	W		L
No. 19 Harvard $	7	–	0	9	–	0
No. 24 Penn	6	–	1	8	–	1
Brown	5	–	2	6	–	3
Princeton	3	–	4	3	–	6
Columbia	3	–	4	3	–	7
Cornell	2	–	5	2	–	7
Dartmouth	1	–	6	1	–	8
Yale	1	–	6	3	–	6
$ – Conference champion; Rankings from The Sports Network poll

The 2001 Cornell Big Red football team was an American football team that represented Cornell University during the 2001 NCAA Division I-AA football season. Cornell finished sixth in the Ivy League.

In its first season under head coach Tim Pendergast, the team compiled a 2–7 record and was outscored 292 to 187. Justin Dunleavy, Ricky Rahne and Nate Spitler were the team captains.

The Big Red's 2–5 conference record placed sixth in the Ivy League standings. Cornell was outscored 219 to 120 by Ivy opponents.

Like most of the Ivy League, Cornell played nine games instead of the usual 10, after the school made the decision to cancel its September 15 season opener against Bucknell, following the September 11 attacks.

Cornell played its home games at Schoellkopf Field in Ithaca, New York.

== Schedule ==
Date	Opponent	Site	Result	Attendance	Source
September 15	Bucknell*	Schoellkopf Field; Ithaca, NY	Canceled		
September 22	at Yale	Yale Bowl; New Haven, CT	L 13–40	20,269	
September 29	at Colgate*	Andy Kerr Stadium; Hamilton, NY (rivalry)	L 32–35	6,858	
October 6	No. 8 Lehigh*	Schoellkopf Field; Ithaca, NY	L 35–38	5,687	
October 13	Harvard	Schoellkopf Field; Ithaca, NY	L 6–26	14,148	
October 20	Brown	Schoellkopf Field; Ithaca, NY	L 21–49	6,039	
October 27	at Princeton	Princeton Stadium; Princeton, NJ	W 10–7	11,685	
November 3	at Dartmouth	Memorial Field; Hanover, NH (rivalry)	W 28–24	5,603	
November 10	Columbia	Schoellkopf Field; Ithaca, NY (rivalry)	L 28–35	5,282	
November 17	at Penn	Franklin Field; Philadelphia, PA (rivalry)	L 14–38	8,806	
*Non-conference game; Rankings from The Sports Network Poll released prior to the game
