= 2001 Columbia Lions football team =

American college football season

2001 Columbia Lions football
- Conference: Ivy League
- Record: 3–7 (3–4 Ivy)
- Head coach: Ray Tellier (13th season)
- Offensive coordinator: Dave Patenaude (1st season)
- Captains: Sloane Joseph; Brian Lysiak; Jeff McCall; Johnathan Reese
- Home stadium: Wien Stadium

2001 Ivy League football standings
	Conf.			Overall
Team	W		L	W		L
No. 19 Harvard $	7	–	0	9	–	0
No. 24 Penn	6	–	1	8	–	1
Brown	5	–	2	6	–	3
Princeton	3	–	4	3	–	6
Columbia	3	–	4	3	–	7
Cornell	2	–	5	2	–	7
Dartmouth	1	–	6	1	–	8
Yale	1	–	6	3	–	6
$ – Conference champion; Rankings from The Sports Network poll

The 2001 Columbia Lions football team was an American football team that represented Columbia University during the 2001 NCAA Division I-AA football season. Columbia tied for fourth in the Ivy League.

In their 13th season under head coach Ray Tellier, the Lions compiled a 3–7 record and were outscored 326 to 206. Sloane Joseph, Brian Lysiak, Jeff McCall and Johnathan Reese were the team captains.

The Lions' 3–4 conference record tied for fourth in the Ivy League standings. Columbia was outscored 231 to 162 by Ivy opponents.

When the September 11 attacks disrupted the opening weekend of Ivy League football, Columbia was the last league member to cancel its scheduled game, making the announcement on Friday afternoon just 24 hours before kickoff. The Lions and crosstown rival Fordham Rams had initially hoped to play the game as a sign of New York City resiliency.

Unlike the other Ivy League teams, which played a nine-game schedule in 2001, Columbia chose to reschedule its canceled game and add it to the end of the year, on Thursday, November 22. This was the first time in nearly 40 years that Columbia had played an opponent other than Brown University in its season-ender, and played a game on Thanksgiving Day; it did both in 1963, when the final game of the season was rescheduled following the assassination of John F. Kennedy.

Columbia played its homes games at Lawrence A. Wien Stadium in Upper Manhattan, in New York City.

== Schedule ==
Date	Opponent	Site	Result	Attendance	Source
September 15	at Fordham*	Coffey Field; Bronx, NY (rivalry)	Postponed		
September 22	Bucknell*	Wien Stadium; New York, NY	L 20–23 ^{OT}	3,116	
September 29	at Princeton	Princeton Stadium; Princeton, NJ	L 11–44	13,559	
October 6	at Lafayette*	Fisher Field; Easton, PA	L 14–31	2,912	
October 13	No. 24 Penn^{†}	Wien Stadium; New York, NY	L 7–35	10,644	
October 20	at Dartmouth	Memorial Field; Hanover, NH	W 27–20	7,020	
October 27	Yale	Wien Stadium; New York, NY	W 28–14	3,079	
November 3	Harvard	Wien Stadium; New York, NY	L 33–45	4,011	
November 10	at Cornell	Schoellkopf Field; Ithaca, NY (rivalry)	W 35–28	5,282	
November 17	Brown	Wien Stadium; New York, NY	L 21–45	3,516	
November 22	at Fordham*	Coffey Field; Bronx, NY (rivalry)	L 10–41	3,715	
*Non-conference game; ^{†}Homecoming; Rankings from The Sports Network Poll released prior to the game
