= 2001 Brown Bears football team =

American college football season

2001 Brown Bears football
- Conference: Ivy League
- Record: 6–3 (5–2 Ivy)
- Head coach: Phil Estes (4th season)
- Offensive scheme: Pro-style
- Defensive coordinator: Michael Kelleher (1st season)
- Base defense: 4–3
- Captains: Uwa Airhiavbere; Dewey Ames; T. Rowley
- Home stadium: Brown Stadium

2001 Ivy League football standings
	Conf.			Overall
Team	W		L	W		L
No. 19 Harvard $	7	–	0	9	–	0
No. 24 Penn	6	–	1	8	–	1
Brown	5	–	2	6	–	3
Princeton	3	–	4	3	–	6
Columbia	3	–	4	3	–	7
Cornell	2	–	5	2	–	7
Dartmouth	1	–	6	1	–	8
Yale	1	–	6	3	–	6
$ – Conference champion; Rankings from The Sports Network poll

The 2001 Brown Bears football team was an American football team that represented Brown University during the 2001 NCAA Division I-AA football season. Brown finished third in the Ivy League.

In their fourth season under head coach Phil Estes, the Bears compiled a 6–3 record and outscored opponents 319 to 235. Uwa Airhiavbere, Dewey Ames, and T. Rowley were the team captains.

The Bears' 5–2 conference record placed third in the Ivy League standings. They outscored Ivy opponents 241 to 170.

Like most of the Ivy League, Brown played nine games instead of the usual 10, after the school made the decision to cancel its September 15 season opener at the University of San Diego, following the September 11 attacks.

Brown played its home games at Brown Stadium in Providence, Rhode Island.

== Schedule ==
Date	Opponent	Site	Result	Attendance	Source
September 15	at San Diego*	Torero Stadium; San Diego, CA	Canceled		
September 22	at Harvard	Harvard Stadium; Boston, MA	L 20–27	8,511	
September 29	No. 9 Rhode Island*	Brown Stadium; Providence, RI (rivalry)	L 38–42	9,365	
October 6	Fordham*	Brown Stadium; Providence, RI	W 40–23	4,441	
October 13	Princeton	Brown Stadium; Providence, RI	W 35–24	12,673	
October 20	at Cornell	Schoellkopf Field; Ithaca, NY	W 49–21	6,039	
October 27	No. 20 Penn	Brown Stadium; Providence, RI	L 14–27	10,181	
November 3	at Yale	Yale Bowl; New Haven, CT	W 37–34	17,184	
November 10	Dartmouth	Brown Stadium; Providence, RI	W 41–16	8,391	
November 17	at Columbia	Wien Stadium; New York, NY	W 45–21	3,516	
*Non-conference game; Rankings from The Sports Network Poll released prior to the game
