= 2001 Lehigh Mountain Hawks football team =

American college football season

2001 Lehigh Mountain Hawks football

Patriot League champion Lambert Cup winner

NCAA Division I-AA Quarterfinal, L 17–34 at Furman
- Conference: Patriot League

Ranking
- Sports Network: No. 5
- Record: 11–1 (7–0 Patriot)
- Head coach: Pete Lembo (1st season)
- Defensive coordinator: Tom Gilmore (2nd season)
- Captains: Brant Hall; Matt Salvaterra; Josh Snyder; Morris Taylor
- Home stadium: Goodman Stadium

2001 Patriot League football standings
	Conf.			Overall
Team	W		L	W		L
No. 5 Lehigh $^	7	–	0	11	–	1
Colgate	5	–	1	7	–	3
Fordham	5	–	2	7	–	4
Bucknell	4	–	3	6	–	4
Holy Cross	3	–	4	4	–	6
Towson	2	–	5	3	–	7
Lafayette	1	–	6	2	–	8
Georgetown	0	–	6	3	–	7
$ – Conference champion; ^ – NCAA Division I-AA playoff participant; Rankings from The Sports Network poll

The 2001 Lehigh Mountain Hawks football team was an American football team that represented Lehigh University during the 2001 NCAA Division I-AA football season. Lehigh was undefeated in the regular season and won a fourth consecutive Patriot League championship, but lost in the second round of the Division I-AA national playoffs.

== Background ==
In their first year under head coach Pete Lembo, the Mountain Hawks compiled a 11–1 record (10–0 in the regular season). Brant Hall, Matt Salvaterra, Josh Snyder and Morris Taylor were the team captains.

The Mountain Hawks outscored opponents 410 to 182. With the addition of Georgetown to the conference, Lehigh's undefeated record made it the first team to win seven Patriot League games in one year.

The Mountain Hawks were ranked No. 10 in the preseason Division I-AA national poll, and rose in the rankings as their 10-game win streak progressed, ending the season at No. 5. Lehigh qualified for the Division I-AA playoffs, hosting and winning a first-round game before losing, in the quarterfinals, to eventual national runner-up Furman.

Like most of the Patriot League, Lehigh played just 10 of its 11 scheduled regular season games, after its September 15 matchup, against Ivy League opponent Penn, was canceled following the September 11 attacks.

Lehigh played its home games at Goodman Stadium on the university's Goodman Campus in Bethlehem, Pennsylvania.

== Schedule ==
Date	Opponent	Rank	Site	Result	Attendance	Source
September 1	at Georgetown	No. 10	Kehoe Field; Washington, DC	W 41–14	2,512	
September 15	at Penn*	No. 10	Franklin Field; Philadelphia, PA	Canceled		
September 22	Princeton*	No. 10	Goodman Stadium; Bethlehem, PA	W 34–10	10,893	
September 29	Central Connecticut*	No. 10	Goodman Stadium; Bethlehem, PA	W 58–10		
October 6	at Cornell*	No. 8	Schoellkopf Field; Ithaca, NY	W 38–35	5,687	
October 13	Towson	No. 6	Goodman Stadium; Bethlehem, PA	W 47–12	10,645	
October 20	at Fordham*	No. 7	Coffey Field; Bronx, NY	W 31–21		
October 27	Holy Cross	No. 8	Goodman Stadium; Bethlehem, PA	W 47–14	14,232	
November 3	at Colgate	No. 8	Andy Kerr Stadium; Hamilton, NY	W 25–22	6,222	
November 10	at Bucknell	No. 7	Christy Mathewson–Memorial Stadium; Lewisburg, PA	W 21–14		
November 17	Lafayette	No. 5	Goodman Stadium; Bethlehem, PA (The Rivalry)	W 41–6	15,600	
December 1	No. 9 Hofstra*	No. 5	Goodman Stadium; Bethlehem, PA (NCAA Division I-AA First Round)	W 27–24 ^{OT}	10,131	
December 8	at No. 4 Furman*	No. 5	Paladin Stadium; Greenville, SC (NCAA Division I-AA Quarterfinal)	L 17–34	10,189	
*Non-conference game; Rankings from The Sports Network Poll released prior to the game
