= 2001 Penn Quakers football team =

American college football season

2001 Penn Quakers football
- Conference: Ivy League
- Record: 8–1 (6–1 Ivy)
- Head coach: Al Bagnoli (10th season)
- Offensive coordinator: Andy Coen (2nd season)
- Defensive coordinator: Ray Priore (4th season)
- Home stadium: Franklin Field

2001 Ivy League football standings
	Conf.			Overall
Team	W		L	W		L
No. 19 Harvard $	7	–	0	9	–	0
No. 24 Penn	6	–	1	8	–	1
Brown	5	–	2	6	–	3
Princeton	3	–	4	3	–	6
Columbia	3	–	4	3	–	7
Cornell	2	–	5	2	–	7
Dartmouth	1	–	6	1	–	8
Yale	1	–	6	3	–	6
$ – Conference champion; Rankings from The Sports Network poll

The 2001 Penn Quakers football team represented the University of Pennsylvania in the 2001 NCAA Division I-AA football season.

== Schedule ==
Date	Opponent	Site	Result	Attendance	Source
September 15	No. 10 Lehigh*	Franklin Field; Philadelphia, PA	Canceled		
September 22	at Lafayette*	Fisher Field; Easton, PA	W 37–0	7,128	
September 29	at Dartmouth	Memorial Field; Hanover, NH	W 21–20	5,929	
October 6	Holy Cross*	Franklin Field; Philadelphia, PA	W 43–7	11,722	
October 13	at Columbia	Wien Stadium; New York, NY	W 35–7	10,644	
October 20	Yale	Franklin Field; Philadelphia, PA	W 21–3	9,419	
October 27	at Brown	Brown Stadium; Providence, RI	W 27–14	10,181	
November 3	Princeton	Franklin Field; Philadelphia, PA (rivalry)	W 21–10	18,810	
November 10	at Harvard	Harvard Stadium; Boston, MA (rivalry)	L 21–28	14,818	
November 17	Cornell	Franklin Field; Philadelphia, PA (rivalry)	W 38–14	8,806	
*Non-conference game; Rankings from Coaches' Poll released prior to the game

== Roster ==
2001 Penn Quakers football team roster
Players
Coaches
Offense

Pos.	#	Name	Class
OL	75	Jeff Hatch	Sr
QB	2	Gavin Hoffman	Sr
WR	7	John Holahan	Sr
OL	63	Ben Noll	So
OL	73	Pat O'Donnell	So
RB	20	Todd Okolovitch	Jr
TE	82	Joseph Pankratz	Fr
OL	66	Randy Parker	Sr
QB	13	Anthony Zara	Jr
OT	52	John Zepeda	Sr

Defense

Pos.	#	Name	Class
LB	9	Vince Alexander	Jr
DE	49	Andrew Altman	Jr
LB	50	Robert Fallon	Fr
DB	6	Stephen Faulk	Sr
DB	28	Anthony Fay	So
DB	21	Seth Fisher	Fr
DT	51	Ed Galan	Sr
DT	56	John Galan	Sr

Special teams

Pos.	#	Name	Class

Head coach

- Al Bagnoli

Coordinators/assistant coaches

Legend

- (C) Team captain
- (S) Suspended
- (I) Ineligible
- Injured
- Redshirt

Roster
Last update: November 26, 2001
