= 2015 Army Black Knights football team =

American college football season

2015 Army Black Knights football
- Conference: Independent
- Record: 2–10
- Head coach: Jeff Monken (2nd season)
- Offensive coordinator: Brent Davis (2nd season)
- Offensive scheme: Triple option
- Defensive coordinator: Jay Bateman (2nd season)
- Base defense: 3–4
- Captains: Matt Giachinta; Jeremy Timpf
- Home stadium: Michie Stadium

2015 NCAA Division I FBS independents football records
	Conf.			Overall
Team	W		L	W		L
No. 11 Notre Dame		–		10	–	3
BYU		–		9	–	4
Army		–		2	–	10
Rankings from AP Poll

The 2015 Army Black Knights football team represented the United States Military Academy as an independent in the 2015 NCAA Division I FBS football season. The Black Knights were led by second-year head coach Jeff Monken and played their home games at Michie Stadium.

== Schedule ==
Date	Time	Opponent	Site	TV	Result	Attendance
September 4	7:00 p.m.	No. 20 (FCS) Fordham	Michie Stadium; West Point, NY	CBSSN	L 35–37	22,523
September 12	12:00 p.m.	at UConn	Pratt & Whitney Stadium at Rentschler Field; East Hartford, CT	CBSSN	L 17–22	28,301
September 19	12:00 p.m.	Wake Forest	Michie Stadium; West Point, NY	CBSSN	L 14–17	29,124
September 26	6:00 p.m.	at Eastern Michigan	Rynearson Stadium; Ypsilanti, MI	ESPN3	W 58–36	6,513
October 3	12:00 p.m.	at Penn State	Beaver Stadium; University Park, PA	ESPNU	L 14–20	107,387
October 10	12:00 p.m.	Duke	Michie Stadium; West Point, NY	CBSSN	L 3–44	39,712
October 17	12:00 p.m.	Bucknell	Michie Stadium; West Point, NY	CBSSN	W 21–14	33,257
October 24	12:00 p.m.	at Rice	Rice Stadium; Houston, TX	FSN	L 31–38	24,409
November 7	3:30 p.m.	at Air Force	Falcon Stadium; Colorado Springs, CO (Commander-in-Chief's Trophy)	ESPNU	L 3–20	37,716
November 14	12:00 p.m.	Tulane^{†}	Michie Stadium; West Point, NY	CBSSN	L 31–34	31,217
November 21	12:00 p.m.	Rutgers	Michie Stadium; West Point, NY	CBSSN	L 21–31	30,113
December 12	3:00 p.m.	vs. No. 21 Navy	Lincoln Financial Field; Philadelphia, PA (Army–Navy Game, Commander-in-Chief's Trophy, College GameDay)	CBS	L 17–21	69,277
^{†}Homecoming; Rankings from AP Poll released prior to the game; All times are in Eastern time

== Game summaries ==
=== Fordham ===
#20 (FCS) Fordham Rams at Army Black Knights

Quarter	1	2	3	4	Total
No. 20 (FCS) Rams	14	13	2	8	37
Black Knights	14	7	8	6	35

at Michie Stadium, West Point, NY

- Date: September 4, 2015
- Game time: 7:00 p.m. EDT
- Game weather: Temperature: N/A • Wind: N/A • Weather: N/A
- Game attendance: 22,523
- Referee: Duane Heydt
- TV announcers (CBSSN): Ben Holden (Play-by-play), Jay Feely (color) & John Schriffen (sideline)
- ESPN - Fordham knocks off another FBS team with 37-35 win over Army /// Box Score, #20 (FCS) Fordham at Army

Game information

First Quarter

- (13:21) ARMY TD: Joe Walker 8-yard pass from Ahmad Bradshaw (Daniel Grochowski kick); 3 plays, 8 yards, 1:09
- (10:03) FORDHAM TD: Kevin Anderson 6-yard rush (Makay Redd kick); 6 plays, 77 yards, 3:08
- (07:29) ARMY TD: Ahmad Bradshaw 15-yard rush (Daniel Grochowski kick); 5 plays, 75 yards, 2:34
- (04:28) FORDHAM TD: Chase Edmonds 14-yard rush (Makay Redd kick); 7 plays, 62 yards, 2:48

Second Quarter

- (12:08) FORDHAM FG: Makay Redd 22-yard field goal; 5 plays, 88 yards, 1:53
- (05:17) ARMY TD: Ahmad Bradshaw 15-yard rush (Daniel Grochowski kick); 10 plays, 75 yards, 6:42
- (01:07) FORDHAM TD: Chase Edmonds 1-yard rush (Makay Redd kick); 8 plays, 85 yards, 4:02
- (00:00) FORDHAM FG: Makay Redd 27-yard field goal; 5 plays, 29 yards, 0:27

Third Quarter

- (10:19) FORDHAM: TEAM Safety Forced on ARMY
- (04:00) ARMY TD: Matt Giachinta 1-yard rush (Ahmad Bradshaw rush); 9 plays, 71 yards, 4:52

Fourth Quarter

- (12:04) FORDHAM TD: Chase Edmonds 10-yard rush (Joe Pavlik rush); 13 plays, 82 yards, 6:47
- (02:33) ARMY TD: Edgar Allen Poe 27-yard pass from Ahmad Bradshaw (Ahmad Bradshaw rush failed); 6 plays, 90 yards, 2:47

Passing

- FORDHAM – Kevin Anderson: 15/23, 322 yds
- ARMY – Ahmad Bradshaw: 6/14, 107 yds, 2 TD, 1 INT

Rushing

- FORDHAM – Chase Edmonds: 20 att, 110 yds, 3 TD
- ARMY – Ahmad Bradshaw: 20 att, 143 yds, 2 TD

Receiving

- FORDHAM – Chase Edmonds: 6 rec, 140 yds
- ARMY – Jordan Asberry: 1 rec, 33 yds

=== At UConn ===
Army Black Knights at Connecticut Huskies

Quarter	1	2	3	4	Total
Black Knights	3	7	0	7	17
Huskies	3	9	7	3	22

at Pratt & Whitney Stadium at Rentschler Field, East Hartford, CT

- Date: September 12, 2015
- Game time: 12:00 p.m. EDT
- Game weather: Temperature: 75 F • Wind: Calm • Weather: Sunny and pleasant
- Game attendance: 28,260
- Referee: Ed Ardito
- TV announcers (CBSSN): Dave Ryan (Play-by-play) & Corey Chavous (color)
- ESPN - UConn beats Army 22-17 for first 2-0 start since 2008 /// Box Score, Army at UConn

Game information

First Quarter

- (08:18) ARMY FG: Daniel Grochowski 41-yard field goal; 8 plays, 29 yards, 4:52
- (02:13) UCONN FG: Bobby Puyol 23-yard field goal; 11 plays, 69 yards, 6:05

Second Quarter

- (08:48) ARMY TD: Ahmad Bradshaw 56-yard rush (Daniel Grochowski kick); 5 plays, 90 yards, 1:50
- (05:07) UCONN TD: Arkeel Newsome 10-yard rush (Bobby Puyol kick blocked); 7 plays, 75 yards, 3:41
- (00:42) UCONN FG: Bobby Puyol 25-yard field goal; 6 plays, 67 yards, 2:46

Third Quarter

- (07:10) UCONN TD: Ron Johnson 2-yard rush (Bobby Puyol kick); 8 plays, 62 yards, 4:44

Fourth Quarter

- (05:33) UCONN FG: Bobby Puyol 39-yard field goal; 10 plays, 34 yards, 5:04
- (04:51) ARMY TD: Joe Walker 71-yard pass from A.J. Schurr (Daniel Grochowski kick); 3 plays, 75 yards, 0:42

Passing

- ARMY – A.J. Schurr: 2/5, 80 yds, 1 TD, 1 INT
- UCONN – Bryant Shirreffs: 19/25, 270 yds

Rushing

- ARMY – Ahmad Bradshaw: 16 att, 129 yds, 1 TD
- UCONN – Arkeel Newsome: 13 att, 73 yds, 1 TD

Receiving

- ARMY – Joe Walker: 1 rec, 71 yds, 1 TD
- UCONN – Noel Thomas: 4 rec, 83 yds

=== Wake Forest ===
Wake Forest Demon Deacons at Army Black Knights

Quarter	1	2	3	4	Total
Demon Deacons	0	0	7	10	17
Black Knights	0	7	0	7	14

at Michie Stadium, West Point, NY

- Date: September 19, 2015
- Game time: 12:00 p.m. EDT
- Game weather: Temperature: 79 F • Wind: S 8 mph • Weather: Mostly sunny
- Game attendance: 29,124
- Referee: Tom McCreesh
- TV announcers (CBSSN): Ben Holden (Play-by-play), Jay Feely (color) & John Schriffen (sideline)
- ESPN - Wake Forest beats Army 17-14 as time expires /// Box Score, Wake Forest at Army

Game information

First Quarter

no scoring

Second Quarter

- (10:07) ARMY TD: Ahmad Bradshaw 4-yard rush (Daniel Grochowski kick); 8 plays, 55 yards, 4:03

Third Quarter

- (04:52) WF TD: Kendall Hinton 15-yard rush (Mike Weaver kick); 5 plays, 79 yards, 1:33

Fourth Quarter

- (13:41) WF TD: Kendall Hinton 7-yard rush (Mike Weaver kick); 9 plays, 71 yards, 3:32
- (07:25) ARMY TD: Christian Drake 9-yard rush (Daniel Grochowski kick); 1 play, 9 yards 0:06
- (00:00) WF FG: Mike Weaver 47-yard field goal; 12 plays, 64 yards, 2:35

Passing

- WF – Kendall Hinton: 15/27, 159 yds, 2 INT
- ARMY – Ahmad Bradshaw: 2/3, 54 yds

Rushing

- WF – Kendall Hinton: 17 att, 101 yds, 2 TD
- ARMY – Ahmad Bradshaw: 21 att, 61 yds, 1 TD

Receiving

- WF – K.J. Brent: 4 rec, 72 yds
- ARMY – DeAndre Bell: 1 rec, 31 yds

=== At Eastern Michigan ===
Army Black Knights at Eastern Michigan Eagles

Quarter	1	2	3	4	Total
Black Knights	15	14	7	22	58
Eagles	3	14	13	6	36

at Rynearson Stadium, Ypsilanti, MI

- Date: September 26, 2015
- Game time: 6:00 p.m. EDT
- Game weather: Temperature: 78 F • Wind: W 12 mph • Weather: Partly cloudy
- Game attendance: 6,513
- Referee: Larry Smith
- TV announcers (ESPN3): Michael Reghi (Play-by-play) & Dustin Fox (color)
- ESPN - Army snaps losing streak, beats Eastern Michigan 58-36 /// Box Score, Army at Eastern Michigan

Game information

First Quarter

- (11:36) ARMY TD: Joe Walker 63-yard rush (Connor Farley pass from Kelvin White); 3 plays, 71 yards, 1:55
- (07:25) EMU FG: Dylan Mulder 43-yard field goal; 4 plays, -5 yards, 0:57
- (00:13) ARMY TD: Edgar Allen Poe 10-yard pass from Ahmad Bradshaw (Daniel Grochowski kick); 13 plays, 77 yards, 7:06

Second Quarter

- (11:54) ARMY TD: Aaron Kemper 56-yard rush (Daniel Grochowski kick); 5 plays, 80 yards, 2:51
- (08:55) EMU TD: Kris Strange 23-yard pass from Brogan Roback (Dylan Mulder kick); 8 plays, 75 yards, 2:59
- (03:27) ARMY TD: John Trainor 5-yard rush (Daniel Grochowski kick); 11 plays, 75 yards, 5:28
- (00:34) EMU TD: Darius Jackson 15-yard rush (Dylan Mulder kick); 11 plays, 75 yards, 2:53

Third Quarter

- (06:47) ARMY TD: A.J. Schurr 1-yard rush (Daniel Grochowski kick); 7 plays, 53 yards, 3:53
- (05:03) EMU TD: Eddie Daugherty 45-yard pass from Brogan Roback (Brogan Roback pass failed); 6 plays, 75 yards, 1:44
- (04:13) EMU TD: Darius Jackson 27-yard rush (Dylan Mulder kick); 1 play, 27 yards, 0:07

Fourth Quarter

- (14:55) ARMY TD: Drue Harris 10-yard rush (A.J. Schurr rush); 11 plays, 86 yards, 4:11
- (03:30) ARMY TD: A.J. Schurr 8-yard rush (Daniel Grochowski kick); 14 plays, 86 yards, 8:44
- (01:55) ARMY TD: Drue Harris 27-yard rush (Daniel Grochowski kick); 1 play, 27 yards, 0:07
- (00:00) EMU TD: Shaq Vann 2-yard rush; 13 plays, 75 yards, 1:55

Passing

- ARMY – A.J. Schurr: 3/7, 70 yds, 1 INT
- EMU – Brogan Roback: 27/39, 280 yds, 2 TD, 1 INT

Rushing

- ARMY – Aaron Kemper: 12 att, 140 yds, 1 TD
- EMU – Darius Jackson: 16 att, 141 yds, 2 TD

Receiving

- ARMY – DeAndre Bell: 2 rec, 67 yds
- EMU – Eddie Daugherty: 5 rec, 109 yds, 1 TD

=== At Penn State ===
Army Black Knights at Penn State Nittany Lions

Quarter	1	2	3	4	Total
Black Knights	0	0	7	7	14
Nittany Lions	7	3	10	0	20

at Beaver Stadium, University Park, PA

- Date: October 3, 2015
- Game time: 12:00 p.m. EDT
- Game weather: Temperature: 43-45 F • Wind: ENE 11 mph • Weather: Rain
- Game attendance: 107,387
- Referee: Todd Geerlings
- TV announcers (ESPNU): Anish Shroff (Play-by-play) & Ahmad Brooks (color)
- ESPN - Balanced Penn State defeats Army 20-14 /// Box Score, Army at Penn State

Game information

First Quarter

- (09:57) PSU TD: Nick Scott 11-yard rush (Joey Julius kick); 8 plays, 42 yards, 3:29

Second Quarter

- (00:25) PSU FG: Joey Julius 37-yard field goal; 7 plays, 21 yards, 3:17

Third Quarter

- (09:53) PSU FG: Joey Julius 27-yard field goal; 5 plays, 19 yards, 2:40
- (05:36) ARMY TD: A.J. Schurr 3-yard rush (Daniel Grochowski kick); 8 plays, 76 yards, 4:11
- (00:00) PSU TD: Mike Gesicki 33-yard pass from Christian Hackenberg (Joey Julius kick); 3 plays, 91 yards, 1:13

Fourth Quarter

- (11:04) ARMY TD: A.J. Schurr 56-yard rush (Daniel Grochowski kick); 7 plays, 84 yards, 3:56

Passing

- ARMY – A.J. Schurr: 1/1, 32 yds
- PSU – Christian Hackenberg: 10/19, 156 yds, 1 TD

Rushing

- ARMY – A.J. Schurr: 24 att, 74 yds, 2 TD
- PSU – Nick Scott: 12 att, 54 yds, 1 TD

Receiving

- ARMY – Edgar Allen Poe: 1 rec, 32 yds
- PSU – Chris Godwin: 4 rec, 66 yds

=== Duke ===
Duke Blue Devils at Army Black Knights

Quarter	1	2	3	4	Total
Blue Devils	10	17	3	14	44
Black Knights	0	0	3	0	3

at Michie Stadium, West Point, NY

- Date: October 10, 2015
- Game time: 12:00 p.m. EDT
- Game weather: Temperature: 55 F • Wind: N 7 mph • Weather: Mostly sunny
- Game attendance: 39,712
- Referee: Ron Cherry
- TV announcers (CBSSN): Ben Holden (Play-by-play), Jay Feely (color) & John Schriffen (sideline)
- ESPN - Duke defense stifles mistake-prone Army in 44-3 win /// Box Score, Duke at Army

Game information

First Quarter

- (11:07) DUKE FG: Ross Martin 40-yard field goal; 11 plays, 53 yards, 3:53
- (01:11) DUKE TD: Erich Schneider 9-yard pass from Thomas Sirk (Ross Martin kick); 4 plays, 17 yards, 1:12

Second Quarter

- (11:01) DUKE TD: Parker Boehme 3-yard rush (Ross Martin kick); 8 plays, 32 yards 2:32
- (06:18) DUKE TD: Jela Duncan 43-yard rush (Ross Martin kick); 7 plays, 72 yards, 2:44
- (00:06) DUKE FG: Ross Martin 25-yard field goal; 15 plays, 58 yards, 4:02

Third Quarter

- (09:00) ARMY FG: Daniel Grochowski 22-yard field goal; 13 plays, 70 yards, 5:52
- (04:30) DUKE FG: Ross Martin 25-yard field goal; 11 plays, 56 yards, 4:23

Fourth Quarter

- (12:42) DUKE TD: Jela Duncan 1-yard rush (Ross Martin kick); 10 plays, 83 yards, 3:22
- (10:18) DUKE TD: Parker Boehme 5-yard rush (Ross Martin kick); 3 plays, 30 yards, 0:52

Passing

- DUKE – Thomas Sirk: 17/27, 197 yds, 1 TD
- ARMY – Ahmad Bradshaw: 2/6, 55 yds, 1 INT

Rushing

- DUKE – Jela Duncan: 8 att, 78 yds, 2 TD
- ARMY – Drue Harris: 4 att, 47 yds

Receiving

- DUKE – Anthony Nash: 5 rec, 57 yds
- ARMY – Kelvin White: 1 rec, 37 yds

=== Bucknell ===
Bucknell Bison at Army Black Knights

Quarter	1	2	3	4	Total
Bison	0	14	0	0	14
Black Knights	0	7	7	7	21

at Michie Stadium, West Point, NY

- Date: October 17, 2015
- Game time: 12:00 p.m. EDT
- Game weather: Temperature: 48 F • Wind: NW 13 mph • Weather: Sunny
- Game attendance: 33,257
- Referee: Jeff Flanagan
- TV announcers (CBSSN): Ben Holden (Play-by-play), Jay Feely (color) & John Schriffen (sideline)
- ESPN - Schurr accounts for 3 TDs to help Army beat Bucknell, 21-14 /// Box Score, Bucknell at Army

Game information

First Quarter

no scoring

Second Quarter

- (05:28) BUCKNELL TD: Will Carter 35-yard pass from R.J. Nitti (John Burdick kick blocked); 2 plays, 44 yards, 0:42
- (01:52) ARMY TD: A.J. Schurr 3-yard rush (Daniel Grochowski kick); 10 plays, 65 yards, 3:36
- (00:26) BUCKNELL TD: Andrew Owers 4-yard pass from R.J. Nitti (Andrew Owers pass from R.J. Nitti); 8 plays, 73 yards, 1:17

Third Quarter

- (01:43) ARMY TD: A.J. Schurr 3-yard rush (Daniel Grochowski kick); 12 plays, 72 yards, 5:36

Fourth Quarter

- (04:44) ARMY TD: Edgar Allen Poe 68-yard pass from A.J. Schurr (Daniel Grochowski kick); 2 plays, 75 yards, 0:51

Passing

- BUCKNELL – R.J. Nitti: 17/33, 186 yds, 2 TD, 1 INT
- ARMY – A.J. Schurr: 3/8, 100 yds, 1 TD, 2 INT

Rushing

- BUCKNELL – Matt DelMauro 18 att, 105 yds
- ARMY – A.J. Schurr: 31 att, 99 yds, 2 TD

Receiving

- BUCKNELL – Bobby Kaslander: 5 rec, 74 yds
- ARMY – Edgar Allen Poe: 3 rec, 100 yds, 1 TD

=== At Rice ===
Army Black Knights at Rice Owls

Quarter	1	2	3	4	Total
Black Knights	0	14	7	10	31
Owls	14	10	0	14	38

at Rice Stadium, Houston, TX

- Date: October 24, 2015
- Game time: 11:00 a.m. CDT
- Game weather: Temperature: 77 F • Wind: SE 8 mph • Weather: Rainy, cloudy
- Game attendance: 24,409
- Referee: Joe Pester
- TV announcers (FSN): Mark Followill (Play-by-play), Brian Baldinger (color) & Lesley Caslin (sideline)
- ESPN - Rice sneaks by Army, 38-31 /// Box Score, Army at Rice

Game information

First Quarter

- (13:38) RICE TD: Darik Dillard 34-yard rush (Hayden Tobola kick); 4 plays, 64 yards, 1:22
- (12:47) RICE TD: Samuel Stewart 1-yard rush (Hayden Tobola kick); 2 plays, 23 yards, 0:19

Second Quarter

- (13:14) ARMY TD: DeAndre Bell 16-yard pass from A.J. Schurr (Daniel Grochowski kick); 6 plays, 97 yards, 2:55
- (03:43) RICE TD: Luke Turner 2-yard rush (Hayden Tobola kick); 8 plays, 58 yards, 3:42
- (03:01) ARMY TD: A.J. Schurr 6-yard rush (Daniel Grochowski kick); 2 plays, 75 yards, 0:42
- (00:00) RICE FG: Hayden Tobola 25-yard field goal; 8 plays, 85 yards, 3:01

Third Quarter

- (03:10) ARMY TD: John Trainor 23-yard rush (Daniel Grochowski kick); 5 plays, 39 yards, 2:55

Fourth Quarter

- (10:37) RICE TD: Nate German 7-yard pass from Driphu Jackson (Hayden Tobola kick); 12 plays, 70 yards, 5:14
- (05:58) ARMY TD: Aaron Kemper 24-yard rush (Daniel Grochowski kick); 3 plays, 51 yards, 1:02
- (02:13) ARMY FG: Daniel Grochowski 19-yard field goal; 4 plays, 8 yards, 2:00
- (00:24) RICE TD: Zach Wright 12-yard pass from Driphu Jackson (Hayden Tobola kick); 7 plays, 75 yards, 1:49

Passing

- ARMY – A.J. Schurr: 2/8, 18 yds, 1 TD
- RICE – Driphu Jackson: 20/30, 267 yds, 2 TD

Rushing

- ARMY – Aaron Kemper: 14 att, 129 yds, 1 TD
- RICE – Darik Dillard: 10 att, 89 yds, 1 TD

Receiving

- ARMY – DeAndre Bell: 1 rec, 16 yds, 1 TD
- RICE – Temi Alaka: 6 rec, 98 yds

=== At Air Force ===
Army Black Knights at Air Force Falcons

Quarter	1	2	3	4	Total
Black Knights	0	0	3	0	3
Falcons	0	10	0	10	20

at Falcon Stadium, Colorado Springs, CO

- Date: November 7, 2015
- Game time: 1:30 p.m. MST
- Game weather: Temperature: 50 F • Wind: S 10 mph • Weather: Clear
- Game attendance: 37,716
- Referee: Tom McCreesh
- TV announcers (ESPNU): Allen Bestwick (Play-by-play) & Dan Hawkins (color)
- ESPN - Griffin, Roberts lift Air Force to 20-3 win over Army /// Box Score, Army at Air Force

Game information

First Quarter

no scoring

Second Quarter

- (08:30) AF FG: Luke Strebel 22-yard field goal; 6 plays, 37 yards, 2:31
- (02:12) AF TD: Garret Griffin 3-yard pass from Karson Roberts (Luke Strebel kick); 8 plays, 83 yards, 3:37

Third Quarter

- (04:18) ARMY FG: Daniel Grochowski 47-yard field goal; 9 plays, 35 yards, 5:02

Fourth Quarter

- (14:55) AF FG: Luke Strebel 42-yard field goal; 10 plays, 50 yards, 4:23
- (08:11) AF TD: Garret Griffin 23-yard pass from Karson Roberts (Luke Strebel kick); 6 plays, 89 yards, 3:13

Passing

- ARMY – Ahmad Bradshaw: 2/8, 45 yds
- AF – Karson Roberts: 7/10, 156 yds, 2 TD

Rushing

- ARMY – Aaron Kemper: 14 att, 47 yds
- AF – D.J. Johnson: 11 att, 47 yds

Receiving

- ARMY – Edgar Allen Poe: 1 rec, 33 yds
- AF – Garrett Brown: 3 rec, 90 yds

=== Tulane ===
Tulane Green Wave at Army Black Knights

Quarter	1	2	3	4	Total
Green Wave	7	21	0	6	34
Black Knights	7	14	0	10	31

at Michie Stadium, West Point, NY

- Date: November 14, 2015
- Game time: 12:00 p.m. EST
- Game weather: Temperature: 45 F • Wind: NW 19 mph • Weather: Partly cloudy
- Game attendance: 31,217
- Referee: Stuart Mullins
- TV announcers (CBSSN): Ben Holden (Play-by-play), Jay Feely (color) & John Schriffen (sideline)
- ESPN - Tulane tops Army 34-31 to snap five-game losing streak /// Box Score, Tulane at Army

Game information

First Quarter

- (08:16) ARMY TD: Ahmad Bradshaw 3-yard rush (Daniel Grochowski kick); 13 plays, 75 yards, 6:44
- (02:58) TLN TD: Teddy Veal 90-yard pass from Tanner Lee (Andrew DiRocco kick); 3 plays, 90 yards, 1:00

Second Quarter

- (12:14) TLN TD: Kendall Ardoin 15-yard pass from Tanner Lee (Andrew DiRocco kick); 7 plays, 59 yards, 2:36
- (08:48) TLN TD: Parry Nickerson 48-yard fumble recovery (Andrew DiRocco kick)
- (03:35) TLN TD: Josh Rounds 25-yard rush (Andrew DiRocco kick); 6 plays, 68 yards, 2:46
- (01:40) ARMY TD: John Trainor 19-yard pass from Ahmad Bradshaw (Daniel Grochowski kick); 4 plays, 72 yards, 1:48
- (00:44) ARMY TD: Kenneth Brinson 21-yard blocked punt return (Daniel Grochowski kick)

Third Quarter

no scoring

Fourth Quarter

- (14:50) ARMY FG: Daniel Grochowski 38-yard field goal; 7 plays, 17 yards, 2:48
- (10:43) TLN FG: Andrew DiRocco 31-yard field goal; 9 plays, 56 yards, 3:57
- (01:59) ARMY TD: Edgar Allen Poe 11-yard pass from Ahmad Bradshaw (Daniel Grochowski kick); 15 plays, 87 yards, 8:37
- (00:00) TLN FG: Andrew DiRocco 35-yard field goal; 9 plays, 59 yards, 1:53

Passing

- TLN – Tanner Lee: 14/29, 252 yds, 2 TD, 1 INT
- ARMY – Ahmad Bradshaw: 6/10, 121 yds, 2 TD

Rushing

- TLN – Dontrell Hilliard: 14 att, 91 yds
- ARMY – Ahmad Bradshaw: 20 att, 72 yds, 1 TD

Receiving

- TLN – Teddy Veal: 4 rec, 123 yds, 1 TD
- ARMY – John Trainor: 3 rec, 81 yds, 1 TD

=== Rutgers ===
Rutgers Scarlet Knights at Army Black Knights

Quarter	1	2	3	4	Total
Scarlet Knights	14	10	7	0	31
Black Knights	0	14	7	0	21

at Michie Stadium, West Point, NY

- Date: November 21, 2015
- Game time: 12:00 p.m. EST
- Game weather: Temperature: 47 F • Wind: ENE 6 mph • Weather: Sunny
- Game attendance: 30,113
- Referee: Riley Johnson
- TV announcers (CBSSN): Ben Holden (Play-by-play), Jay Feely (color) & John Schriffen (sideline)
- ESPN - James scores 3 TDs, Rutgers beats Army 31-21 /// Box Score, Rutgers at Army

Game information

First Quarter

- (08:44) RU TD: Paul James 7-yard rush (Kyle Federico kick); 5 plays, 60 yards, 2:16
- (00:44) RU TD: Paul James 1-yard rush (Kyle Federico kick); 5 plays 39 yards, 2:15

Second Quarter

- (11:11) ARMY TD: Aaron Kemper 38-yard rush (Daniel Grochowski kick); 8 plays, 88 yards, 4:25
- (07:17) RU TD: Robert Martin 5-yard rush (Kyle Federico kick); 10 plays, 59 yards, 3:46
- (01:09) ARMY TD: Chris Carter 1-yard rush (Daniel Grochowski kick); 10 plays, 80 yards, 6:00
- (00:19) RU FG: Kyle Federico 41-yard field goal; 9 plays, 43 yards, 1:08

Third Quarter

- (11:21) RU TD: Paul James 1-yard rush (Kyle Federico kick); 7 plays, 68 yards, 3:39
- (00:19) ARMY TD: Edgar Allen Poe 65-yard pass from Chris Carter (Daniel Grochowski kick); 3 plays, 68 yards, 1:34

Fourth Quarter

no scoring

Passing

- RU – Chris Laviano: 13/21, 105 yds
- ARMY – Chris Carter: 4/6, 140 yds, 1 TD, 1 INT

Rushing

- RU – Paul James: 18 att, 116 yds, 3 TD
- ARMY – Chris Carter: 20 att, 111 yds, 1 TD

Receiving

- RU – Leonte Carroo: 4 rec, 37 yds
- ARMY – Edgar Allen Poe: 2 rec, 95 yds, 1 TD

=== Vs. Navy ===
Army Black Knights vs. #21 Navy Midshipmen (116th Army-Navy Game)

Quarter	1	2	3	4	Total
Black Knights	10	7	0	0	17
No. 21 Midshipmen	7	7	7	0	21

at Lincoln Financial Field, Philadelphia, PA

- Date: December 12, 2015
- Game time: 3:00 p.m. EST
- Game weather: Temperature: 68 F • Wind: WSW 6 mph • Weather: Mostly cloudy
- Game attendance: 69,722
- Referee: Tracy Jones
- TV announcers (CBS): Verne Lundquist (Play-by-play), Gary Danielson (color) & Allie LaForce (sideline)
- ESPN - Navy tops Army for 14th straight series triumph /// Box Score, Army vs Navy (116th Army-Navy Game)

Game information

First Quarter

- (08:31) ARMY FG: Daniel Grochowski 32-yard field goal; 7 plays, 26 yards, 3:13
- (07:58) NAVY TD: Keenan Reynolds 58-yard rush (Austin Grebe kick); 2 plays, 75 yards, 0:33
- (04:10) ARMY TD: Tyler Campbell 29-yard rush (Daniel Grochowski kick); 7 plays, 82 yards, 3:43

Second Quarter

- (12:18) NAVY TD: Keenan Reynolds 1-yard rush (Austin Grebe kick); 7 plays, 50 yards, 3:27
- (02:08) ARMY TD: Edgar Allen Poe 39-yard pass from Chris Carter (Daniel Grochowski kick); 2 plays, 54 yards, 0:40

Third Quarter

- (05:51) NAVY TD: Jamir Tillman 50-yard pass from Keenan Reynolds (Austin Grebe kick); 1 play, 50 yards, 0:10

Fourth Quarter

no scoring

Passing

- ARMY – Chris Carter: 9/15, 208 yds, 1 TD, 1 INT
- NAVY – Keenan Reynolds: 6/14, 113 yds, 1 TD

Rushing

- ARMY – Aaron Kemper: 7 att, 38 yds
- NAVY – Keenan Reynolds: 21 att, 136 yds, 2 TD

Receiving

- ARMY – Edgar Allen Poe: 5 rec, 121 yds, 1 TD
- NAVY – Jamir Tillman: 5 rec, 102 yds, 1 TD
