= 2001 Harvard Crimson football team =

American college football season

2001 Harvard Crimson football

Ivy League champion
- Conference: Ivy League

Ranking
- Sports Network: No. 19
- Record: 9–0 (7–0 Ivy)
- Head coach: Tim Murphy (8th season)
- Offensive coordinator: Jay Mills (6th season)
- Offensive scheme: Multiple pro-style
- Captain: Ryan FitzGerald
- Home stadium: Harvard Stadium

2001 Ivy League football standings
	Conf.			Overall
Team	W		L	W		L
No. 19 Harvard $	7	–	0	9	–	0
No. 24 Penn	6	–	1	8	–	1
Brown	5	–	2	6	–	3
Princeton	3	–	4	3	–	6
Columbia	3	–	4	3	–	7
Cornell	2	–	5	2	–	7
Dartmouth	1	–	6	1	–	8
Yale	1	–	6	3	–	6
$ – Conference champion; Rankings from The Sports Network poll

The 2001 Harvard Crimson football team was an American football team that represented Harvard University during the 2001 NCAA Division I-AA football season. Harvard was undefeated and won the Ivy League championship.

In their eighth year under head coach Timothy Murphy, the Crimson compiled a 9–0 record and outscored opponents 293 to 184. Ryan FitzGerald was the team captain.

Harvard's undefeated (7–0) conference record placed first in the Ivy League standings. The Crimson outscored Ivy opponents 220 to 150.

Like most of the Ivy League, Harvard played nine games instead of the usual 10, after the school made the decision to cancel its September 15 season opener against Holy Cross, following the September 11 attacks. It was the first year in more than two decades without a Crimson-Crusader football game, and the only year without the intrastate matchup between 1981 and 2015.

The Crimson began the year unranked, and did not enter the national top 25 until they had recorded its seventh win without a loss. Harvard entered the season's penultimate week at No. 24 and rose to No. 19 after defeating a ranked Penn Quakers team.

Harvard played its home games at Harvard Stadium in the Allston neighborhood of Boston, Massachusetts.

== Schedule ==
Date	Opponent	Site	Result	Attendance	Source
September 15	at Holy Cross*	Fitton Field; Worcester, MA	Canceled		
September 22	Brown	Harvard Stadium; Boston, MA	W 27–20	8,511	
September 29	Lafayette*	Harvard Stadium; Boston, MA	W 38–14	5,803	
October 6	Northeastern*	Harvard Stadium; Boston, MA	W 35–20	6,513	
October 13	at Cornell	Schoellkopf Field; Ithaca, NY	W 26–6	14,148	
October 20	Princeton	Harvard Stadium; Boston, MA (rivalry)	W 28–26	9,326	
October 27	Dartmouth	Harvard Stadium; Boston, MA (rivalry)	W 31–21	12,324	
November 3	at Columbia	Wien Stadium; New York, NY	W 45–33	4,011	
November 10	No. 19 Penn	Harvard Stadium; Boston, MA (rivalry)	W 28–21	14,818	
November 17	at Yale	Yale Bowl; New Haven, CT (The Game)	W 35–23	51,634	
*Non-conference game; Rankings from The Sports Network Poll released prior to the game

== Roster ==
2001 Harvard Crimson football team roster
Players			Coaches
Offense: Pos. / # / Name / Class; QB / 14 / Ryan Fitzpatrick / Fr	Defense: Pos. / # / Name / Class	Special teams: Pos. / # / Name / Class	Head coach: Tim Murphy; Coordinators/assistant coaches Legend: (C) Team captain; (S) Suspended; (I) Ineligible; Injured; Redshirt; Roster
