= 2001 Yale Bulldogs football team =

American college football season

2001 Yale Bulldogs football
- Conference: Ivy League
- Record: 3–6 (1–6 Ivy)
- Head coach: Jack Siedlecki (5th season)
- Home stadium: Yale Bowl

2001 Ivy League football standings
	Conf.			Overall
Team	W		L	W		L
No. 19 Harvard $	7	–	0	9	–	0
No. 24 Penn	6	–	1	8	–	1
Brown	5	–	2	6	–	3
Princeton	3	–	4	3	–	6
Columbia	3	–	4	3	–	7
Cornell	2	–	5	2	–	7
Dartmouth	1	–	6	1	–	8
Yale	1	–	6	3	–	6
$ – Conference champion; Rankings from The Sports Network poll

The 2001 Yale Bulldogs football team represented Yale University in the 2001 NCAA Division I-AA football season. The Bulldogs were led by fifth-year head coach Jack Siedlecki, played their home games at the Yale Bowl and finished last in the Ivy League with a 1–6 record, 3–6 overall.

Like most of the Ivy League, Yale played nine games instead of the usual 10, after its September 15 season opener against Towson was canceled following the September 11 attacks. Yale averaged 25,533 fans per game.

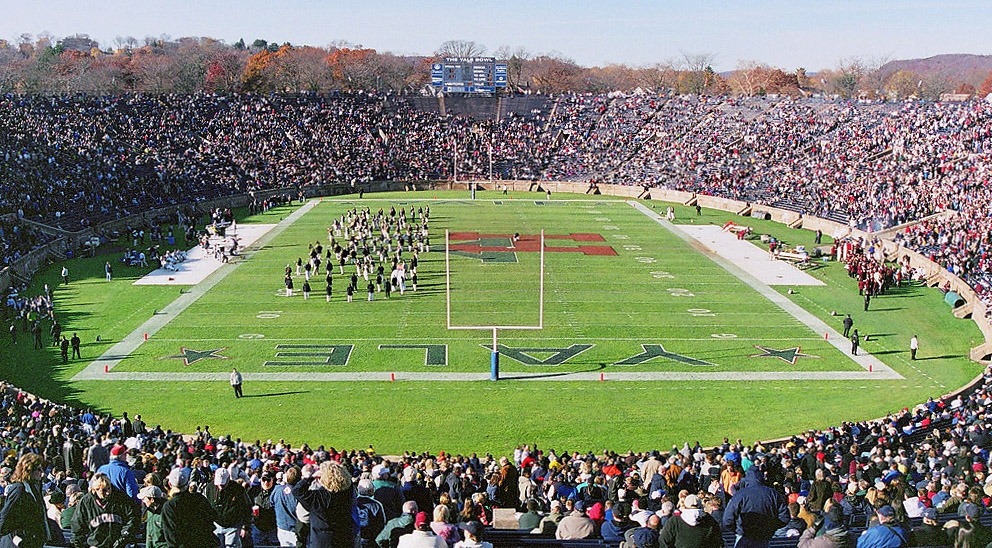
Half-time festivities during The Yale and Harvard Game at Yale Bowl, November 2001

== Schedule ==
Date	Opponent	Site	Result	Attendance	Source
September 15	at Towson*	Minnegan Stadium; Towson, MD	Canceled		
September 22	Cornell	Yale Bowl; New Haven, CT	W 40–13	20,269	
September 29	at Holy Cross*	Fitton Field; Worcester, MA	W 23–22	8,547	
October 7	Dartmouth	Yale Bowl; New Haven, CT	L 27–32	19,996	
October 13	Fordham	Yale Bowl; New Haven, CT	W 36–27	18,580	
October 20	at Penn	Franklin Field; Philadelphia, PA	L 3–21	9,419	
October 27	at Columbia	Wien Stadium; New York, NY	L 14–28	3,079	
November 3	Brown	Yale Bowl; New Haven, CT	L 34–37	17,184	
November 10	at Princeton	Princeton Stadium; Princeton, NJ (rivalry)	L 14–28	20,129	
November 17	Harvard	Yale Bowl; New Haven, CT (The Game)	L 23–35	51,634	
*Non-conference game
