= 2001 Dartmouth Big Green football team =

American college football season

2001 Dartmouth Big Green football
- Conference: Ivy League
- Record: 1–8 (1–6 Ivy)
- Head coach: John Lyons (10th season)
- Captain: Matthew Mercer
- Home stadium: Memorial Field

2001 Ivy League football standings
	Conf.			Overall
Team	W		L	W		L
No. 19 Harvard $	7	–	0	9	–	0
No. 24 Penn	6	–	1	8	–	1
Brown	5	–	2	6	–	3
Princeton	3	–	4	3	–	6
Columbia	3	–	4	3	–	7
Cornell	2	–	5	2	–	7
Dartmouth	1	–	6	1	–	8
Yale	1	–	6	3	–	6
$ – Conference champion; Rankings from The Sports Network poll

The 2001 Dartmouth Big Green football team was an American football team that represented Dartmouth College during the 2001 NCAA Division I-AA football season. Dartmouth finished second in the Ivy League.

In their sixth season under head coach John Lyons, the Big Green compiled an 8–2 record and outscored opponents 208 to 165. Matthew Mercer was the team captain.

The Big Green's 6–1 conference record placed second in the Ivy League standings. Dartmouth outscored Ivy opponents 116 to 103.

Like most of the Ivy League, Dartmouth played nine games instead of the usual 10, after the school made the decision to cancel its September 15 season opener against Colgate, following the September 11 attacks.

Dartmouth played its home games at Memorial Field on the college campus in Hanover, New Hampshire.

== Schedule ==
Date	Opponent	Site	Result	Attendance	Source
September 15	at Colgate*	Andy Kerr Stadium; Hamilton, NY	Canceled		
September 22	No. 21 New Hampshire*	Memorial Field; Hanover, NH (rivalry)	L 38–42	6,922	
September 27	Penn	Memorial Field; Hanover, NH	L 20–21	5,929	
October 7	at Yale	Yale Bowl; New Haven, CT	W 32–27	19,996	
October 13	at Holy Cross*	Fitton Field; Worcester, MA	L 17–49	8,817	
October 20	Columbia^{†}	Memorial Field; Hanover, NH	L 20–27	7,020	
October 27	at Harvard	Harvard Stadium; Boston, MA (rivalry)	L 21–31	12,324	
November 3	Cornell	Memorial Field; Hanover, NH (rivalry)	L 24–28	5,603	
November 10	at Brown	Brown Stadium; Providence, RI	L 16–41	8,391	
November 17	Princeton	Memorial Field; Hanover, NH	L 14–35	2,417	
*Non-conference game; ^{†}Homecoming; Rankings from The Sports Network Poll released prior to the game

== Roster ==
2001 Dartmouth Big Green football team roster
Players
Coaches
Offense

Pos.	#	Name	Class
QB	5	Brian Mann	Jr
TE	82	Casey Cramer	So

Defense

Pos.	#	Name	Class

Special teams

Pos.	#	Name	Class

Head coach

- John Lyons

Coordinators/assistant coaches

Legend

- (C) Team captain
- (S) Suspended
- (I) Ineligible
- Injured
- Redshirt

Roster
