= 2001 Lafayette Leopards football team =

American college football season

2001 Lafayette Leopards football
- Conference: Patriot League
- Record: 2–8 (1–6 Patriot)
- Head coach: Frank Tavani (2nd season)
- Offensive coordinator: Mike Faragalli (2nd season)
- Offensive scheme: Multiple
- Defensive coordinator: John Loose (2nd season)
- Base defense: 4–3
- Home stadium: Fisher Field

2001 Patriot League football standings
	Conf.			Overall
Team	W		L	W		L
No. 5 Lehigh $^	7	–	0	11	–	1
Colgate	5	–	1	7	–	3
Fordham	5	–	2	7	–	4
Bucknell	4	–	3	6	–	4
Holy Cross	3	–	4	4	–	6
Towson	2	–	5	3	–	7
Lafayette	1	–	6	2	–	8
Georgetown	0	–	6	3	–	7
$ – Conference champion; ^ – NCAA Division I-AA playoff participant; Rankings from The Sports Network poll

The 2001 Lafayette Leopards football team represented Lafayette College as a member of the Patriot League during the 2001 NCAA Division I-AA football season. Led by second-year head coach Frank Tavani, the Leopards compiled an overall record of 2–8 with a mark of 1–6 in conference play, placing seventh in the Patriot League. The team played home games at Fisher Field in Easton, Pennsylvania.

Lafayette's September 15 game at Princeton was canceled due to college football's collective decision to postpone games following the September 11 attacks.

== Schedule ==
Date	Time	Opponent	Site	TV	Result	Attendance	Source
September 8	1:00 p.m.	at Towson	Minnegan Stadium; Towson, MD		L 13–16 ^{OT}	2,810	
September 15	7:00 p.m.	at Princeton*	Princeton Stadium; Princeton, NJ	LSN	Canceled		
September 22	1:30 p.m.	Penn*	Fisher Field; Easton, PA	LSN	L 0–37	7,128	
September 29	1:00 p.m.	at Harvard*	Harvard Stadium; Boston, MA		L 14–38	5,803	
October 6	1:00 p.m.	Columbia*	Fisher Field; Easton, PA	LSN	W 31–14	2,912	
October 13	1:00 p.m.	Bucknell	Fisher Field; Easton, PA	LSN	L 16–17	4,521	
October 20	1:00 p.m.	at Holy Cross	Fitton Field; Worcester, MA	LSN	L 53–63	13,219	
October 27	1:30 p.m.	Colgate^{†}	Fisher Field; Easton, PA	LSN	L 16–20	4,756	
November 3	12:30 p.m.	Fordham	Fisher Field; Easton, PA	LSN	L 24–45	3,981	
November 10	12:30 p.m.	at Georgetown	Kehoe Field; Washington, DC		W 37–17	1,786	
November 17	12:30 p.m.	at No. 5 Lehigh	Goodman Stadium; Bethlehem, PA (The Rivalry)	LSN	L 6–41	15,600	
*Non-conference game; ^{†}Homecoming; Rankings from The Sports Network Poll released prior to the game; All times are in Eastern time
