= 2015 Fordham Rams football team =

American college football season

2015 Fordham Rams football

NCAA Division I First Round, L 20–50 at Chattanooga
- Conference: Patriot League

Ranking
- STATS: No. 19
- FCS Coaches: No. 19
- Record: 9–3 (5–1 Patriot)
- Head coach: Joe Moorhead (4th season)
- Offensive coordinator: Andrew Breiner (4th season)
- Co-defensive coordinators: Jon Wholley (2nd season); Tim Cary (2nd season)
- Home stadium: Coffey Field

2015 Patriot League football standings
	Conf.			Overall
Team	W		L	W		L
No. 17 Colgate $^	6	–	0	9	–	5
No. 19 Fordham ^	5	–	1	9	–	3
Lehigh	4	–	2	6	–	5
Holy Cross	3	–	3	6	–	5
Georgetown	2	–	4	4	–	7
Bucknell	1	–	5	4	–	7
Lafayette	0	–	6	1	–	10
$ – Conference champion; ^ – FCS playoff participant; Rankings from STATS Poll

The 2015 Fordham Rams football team represented Fordham University as a member of the Patriot League during the 2015 NCAA Division I FCS football season. Led by Joe Moorhead in his fourth and final season as head coach, the Rams compiled an overall record of 9–3 with a mark of 5–1 in conference play, placing second in the Patriot League. Fordham received an at-large bid to the NCAA Division I Football Championship playoffs, where the Rams lost in the first round to Chattanooga. The team played home games at Coffey Field in The Bronx.

On December 12, Moorehead resigned to become the offensive coordinator at Penn State. He finished his tenure at Fordham with a four-year record of 38–13.

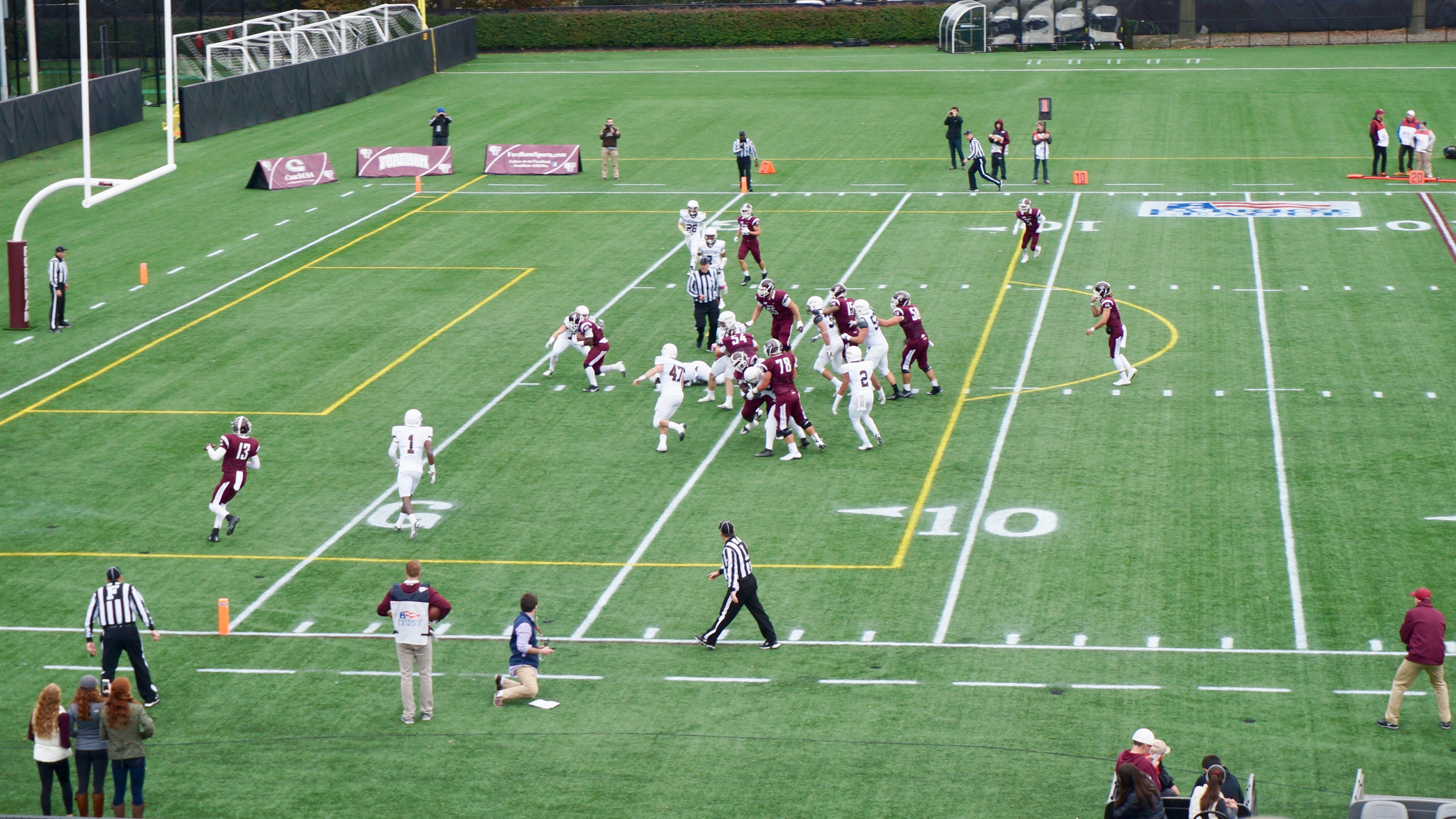
Fordham vs. Lehigh

== Schedule ==
Date	Time	Opponent	Rank	Site	TV	Result	Attendance
September 4	7:00 pm	at Army*	No. 20	Michie Stadium; West Point, NY	CBSSN	W 37–35	22,523
September 12	6:00 pm	No. 6 Villanova*	No. 16	Coffey Field; Bronx, NY	PLL	L 7–14	6,586
September 19	1:00 pm	Columbia*^{†}	No. 18	Coffey Field; Bronx, NY (Liberty Cup)		W 44–24	8,052
September 26	1:00 pm	Monmouth*	No. 16	Coffey Field; Bronx, NY		W 54–31	3,471
October 3	1:00 pm	at Lafayette	No. 15	Fisher Stadium; Easton, PA		W 35–7	3,774
October 10	1:00 pm	at Penn*	No. 13	Franklin Field; Philadelphia, PA		W 48–45	2,847
October 17	1:00 pm	Holy Cross	No. 10	Coffey Field; Bronx, NY (Ram–Crusader Cup)		W 47–41 ^{OT}	6,825
October 24	1:00 pm	Lehigh	No. 10	Coffey Field; Bronx, NY		W 59–42	4,867
October 31	1:00 pm	at Colgate	No. 11	Crown Field at Andy Kerr Stadium; Hamilton, NY	PLL	L 29–31	7,879
November 7	1:00 pm	Bucknell	No. 16	Coffey Field; Bronx, NY		W 24–16	9,192
November 14	12:00 pm	at Georgetown	No. 16	Multi-Sport Field; Washington, DC		W 38–31	2,219
November 28	1:00 pm	at No. 7 Chattanooga*	No. 14	Finley Stadium; Chattanooga, TN (NCAA Division I First Round)	ESPN3	L 20–50	4,888
*Non-conference game; ^{†}Homecoming; Rankings from STATS Poll released prior to the game; All times are in Eastern time

== Game summaries ==
=== At Army ===
	1	2	3	4	Total
#20 Rams	14	13	2	8	37
Black Knights	14	7	8	6	35

=== Villanova ===
	1	2	3	4	Total
#6 Wildcats	7	7	0	0	14
#16 Rams	0	7	0	0	7

=== Columbia ===
	1	2	3	4	Total
Lions	0	10	14	0	24
#18 Rams	7	14	7	16	44

=== Monmouth ===
	1	2	3	4	Total
Hawks	3	14	7	7	31
#16 Rams	14	21	13	6	54

=== At Lafayette ===
	1	2	3	4	Total
#15 Rams	14	7	14	0	35
Leopards	7	0	0	0	7

=== At Penn ===
	1	2	3	4	Total
#13 Rams	14	21	0	13	48
Quakers	0	17	13	15	45

=== Holy Cross ===
	1	2	3	4	OT	Total
Crusaders	17	0	21	3	0	41
#10 Rams	7	20	14	0	6	47

=== Lehigh ===
	1	2	3	4	Total
Mountain Hawks	7	14	0	21	42
#10 Rams	14	3	21	21	59

=== At Colgate ===
	1	2	3	4	Total
#11 Rams	3	6	0	20	29
Raiders	14	10	0	7	31

=== Bucknell ===
	1	2	3	4	Total
Bison	7	3	0	6	16
#16 Rams	7	3	7	7	24

=== At Georgetown ===
	1	2	3	4	Total
#16 Rams	14	14	3	7	38
Hoyas	7	14	7	3	31

== FCS playoffs ==
=== First round – at Chattanooga ===
	1	2	3	4	Total
#13 Rams	0	0	14	6	20
#7 Mocs	21	10	10	9	50

== Ranking movements ==
Ranking movements Legend: ██ Increase in ranking ██ Decrease in ranking
	Week													
Poll	Pre	1	2	3	4	5	6	7	8	9	10	11	12	Final
STATS FCS	20	16	18	16	15	13	10	10	11	16	16	13	13	19
Coaches	21	16	19	16	13	12	10	11	11	17	17	14	14	19
