= 2001 Towson Tigers football team =

American college football season

2001 Towson Tigers football
- Conference: Patriot League
- Record: 3–7 (2–5 Patriot)
- Head coach: Gordy Combs (10th season)
- Home stadium: Minnegan Stadium

2001 Patriot League football standings
| | Conf. | | | Overall |
| Team | W | | L | W | | L |
|---|---|---|---|---|---|---|
| No. 5 Lehigh $^ | 7 | – | 0 | 11 | – | 1 |
| Colgate | 5 | – | 1 | 7 | – | 3 |
| Fordham | 5 | – | 2 | 7 | – | 4 |
| Bucknell | 4 | – | 3 | 6 | – | 4 |
| Holy Cross | 3 | – | 4 | 4 | – | 6 |
| Towson | 2 | – | 5 | 3 | – | 7 |
| Lafayette | 1 | – | 6 | 2 | – | 8 |
| Georgetown | 0 | – | 6 | 3 | – | 7 |
$ – Conference champion; ^ – NCAA Division I-AA playoff participant; Rankings from The Sports Network poll

The 2001 Towson Tigers football team was an American football team that represented Towson University during the 2001 NCAA Division I-AA football season. Towson finished sixth in the Patriot League.

In their 10th year under head coach Gordy Combs, the Tigers compiled a 3–7 record.

The Tigers were outscored 257 to 149. Their 2–5 conference record placed sixth out of eight in the Patriot League standings.

Like most of the Patriot League, Towson played just 10 of its 11 scheduled regular season games, after its September 15 matchup, against Ivy League opponent Yale, was canceled following the September 11 attacks.

Towson played its home games at Minnegan Stadium on the university campus in Towson, Maryland.

== Schedule ==
| Date | Opponent | Site | Result | Attendance | Source |
|---|---|---|---|---|---|
| September 1 | at Albany* | University Field; Albany, NY | L 10–14 | 2,026 | |
| September 8 | Lafayette | Minnegan Stadium; Towson, MD | W 16–13 ^{OT} | 2,810 | |
| September 15 | Yale* | Minnegan Stadium; Towson, MD | Canceled | | |
| September 22 | Holy Cross | Minnegan Stadium; Towson, MD | L 9–17 | 2,095 | |
| September 29 | at Morgan State* | Hughes Stadium; Baltimore, MD (rivalry) | W 20–17 ^{OT} | 7,418 | |
| October 6 | at Bucknell | Christy Mathewson–Memorial Stadium; Lewisburg, PA | L 10–51 | 2,897 | |
| October 13 | at No. 6 Lehigh | Goodman Stadium; Bethlehem, PA | L 12–47 | 10,645 | |
| October 20 | at Colgate | Andy Kerr Stadium; Hamilton, NY | L 5–37 | 3,865 | |
| October 27 | Monmouth^{†}* | Minnegan Stadium; Towson, MD | L 17–24 | 3,864 | |
| November 10 | Fordham | Minnegan Stadium; Towson, MD | L 23–28 | 3,568 | |
| November 17 | at Georgetown | Kehoe Field; Washington, DC | W 27–9 | 2,201 | |
*Non-conference game; ^{†}Homecoming; Rankings from The Sports Network Poll released prior to the game
