= 2001 Colgate Raiders football team =

American college football season

2001 Colgate Raiders football
- Conference: Patriot League
- Record: 7–3 (5–1 Patriot)
- Head coach: Dick Biddle (6th season)
- Captains: Ron Hampton; Ken Kubec
- Home stadium: Andy Kerr Stadium

2001 Patriot League football standings
	Conf.			Overall
Team	W		L	W		L
No. 5 Lehigh $^	7	–	0	11	–	1
Colgate	5	–	1	7	–	3
Fordham	5	–	2	7	–	4
Bucknell	4	–	3	6	–	4
Holy Cross	3	–	4	4	–	6
Towson	2	–	5	3	–	7
Lafayette	1	–	6	2	–	8
Georgetown	0	–	6	3	–	7
$ – Conference champion; ^ – NCAA Division I-AA playoff participant; Rankings from The Sports Network poll

The 2001 Colgate Raiders football team was an American football team that represented Colgate University during the 2001 NCAA Division I-AA football season. Colgate finished second in the Patriot League.

In its sixth season under head coach Dick Biddle, the team compiled a 7–3 record. Ken Kubec and Ron Hampton were the team captains.

The Raiders outscored opponents 247 to 189. Colgate's 5–1 conference record placed second in the Patriot League standings, edging 5–2 Fordham by a margin of half a game. Colgate was not able to schedule a matchup with the league's newest member, Georgetown University, accounting for the difference in the number of league games played.

Just before the start of the season, in mid-August, the university trustees announced that Colgate would shorten its athletics nickname to simply "Raiders". Though the longstanding "Red Raiders" name was not originally a reference to Native Americans, such imagery had built up over the years, and the students and faculty who had asked for the change cited increasing sensitivity to racial stereotypes as their reason.

Like most of the Patriot League, Colgate played just 10 of its 11 scheduled games, after its September 15 matchup, against Ivy League opponent Dartmouth, was canceled following the September 11 attacks.

Colgate played its home games at Andy Kerr Stadium in Hamilton, New York.

== Schedule ==
Date	Opponent	Site	Result	Attendance	Source
August 30	at No. 20 Villanova*	Villanova Stadium; Villanova, PA	L 14–38	10,971	
September 8	at Maine*	Alfond Stadium; Orono, ME	L 10–34	5,311	
September 15	Dartmouth*	Andy Kerr Stadium; Hamilton, NY	Canceled		
September 22	Fordham	Andy Kerr Stadium; Hamilton, NY	W 21–9	7,028	
September 29	Cornell*	Andy Kerr Stadium; Hamilton, NY (rivalry)	W 35–32	6,858	
October 6	at Princeton*	Princeton Stadium; Princeton, NJ	W 35–10	12,304	
October 20	Towson	Andy Kerr Stadium; Hamilton, NY	W 37–5	3,865	
October 27	at Lafayette	Fisher Field; Easton, PA	W 20–16		
November 3	No. 8 Lehigh	Andy Kerr Stadium; Hamilton, NY	L 22–25	6,222	
November 10	at Holy Cross	Fitton Field; Worcester, MA	W 35–7	9,135	
November 17	Bucknell	Andy Kerr Stadium; Hamilton, NY	W 15–13		
*Non-conference game; Rankings from The Sports Network Poll released prior to the game
