= 2015 Lehigh Mountain Hawks football team =

American college football season

2015 Lehigh Mountain Hawks football
- Conference: Patriot League
- Record: 6–5 (4–2 Patriot)
- Head coach: Andy Coen (10th season)
- Offensive coordinator: Drew Folmar (2nd season)
- Defensive coordinator: Joe Bottiglieri (2nd season)
- Home stadium: Goodman Stadium

2015 Patriot League football standings
	Conf.			Overall
Team	W		L	W		L
No. 17 Colgate $^	6	–	0	9	–	5
No. 19 Fordham ^	5	–	1	9	–	3
Lehigh	4	–	2	6	–	5
Holy Cross	3	–	3	6	–	5
Georgetown	2	–	4	4	–	7
Bucknell	1	–	5	4	–	7
Lafayette	0	–	6	1	–	10
$ – Conference champion; ^ – FCS playoff participant; Rankings from STATS Poll

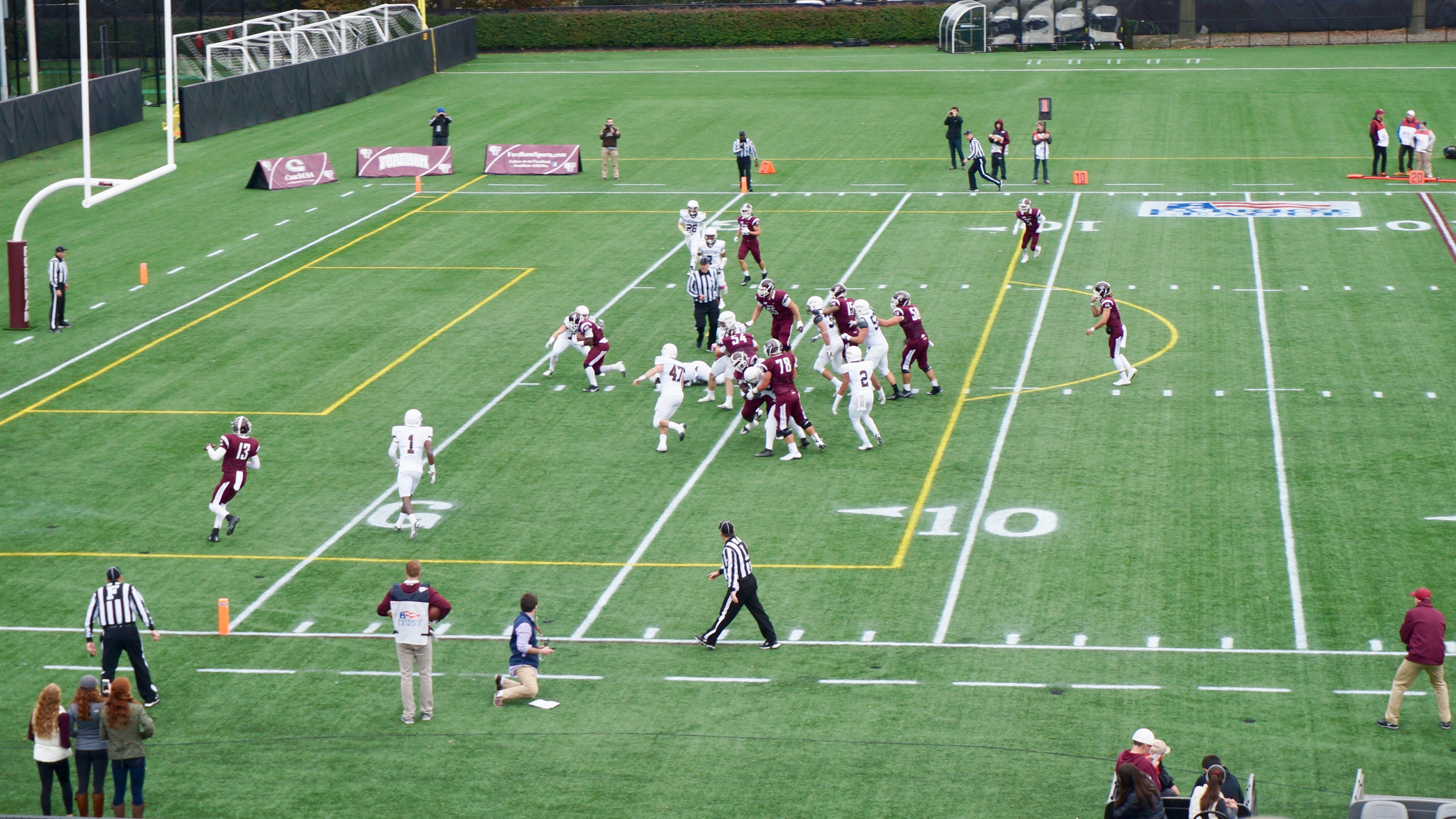
Lehigh Mountain Hawks vs Fordham Rams, October 24, 2015

The 2015 Lehigh Mountain Hawks football team represented Lehigh University in the 2015 NCAA Division I FCS football season. They were led by tenth-year head coach Andy Coen and played their home games at Goodman Stadium. They were a member of the Patriot League. They finished the season 6–5, 4–2 in Patriot League play to finish in third place.

== Schedule ==
Date	Time	Opponent	Site	TV	Result	Attendance
September 5	7:00 pm	at Central Connecticut*	Arute Field; New Britain, CT		W 20–14	5,077
September 12	4:00 pm	at No. 13 James Madison*	Bridgefourth Stadium; Harrisonburg, VA		L 17–55	15,949
September 19	12:30 pm	Penn*	Goodman Stadium; Bethlehem, PA	SE2	W 42–21	6,971
September 26	5:00 pm	at Princeton*	Powers Field at Princeton Stadium; Princeton, NJ		L 26–52	15,023
October 3	12:30 pm	Yale*^{†}	Goodman Stadium; Bethlehem, PA	SE2	L 12–27	5,472
October 10	1:00 pm	at Bucknell	Christy Mathewson–Memorial Stadium; Lewisburg, PA		W 21–10	4,196
October 24	1:00 pm	at No. 10 Fordham	Coffey Field; Bronx, NY		L 42–59	4,867
October 31	12:30 pm	Georgetown	Goodman Stadium; Bethlehem, PA	SE2	W 33–28	7,950
November 7	12:30 pm	Holy Cross	Goodman Stadium; Bethlehem, PA	PLL	W 51–38	5,732
November 14	1:00 pm	at Colgate	Crown Field at Andy Kerr Stadium; Hamilton, NY		L 42–49	3,828
November 21	12:30 pm	Lafayette	Goodman Stadium; Bethlehem, PA (The Rivalry)	WFMZ	W 49–35	15,921
*Non-conference game; ^{†}Homecoming; Rankings from STATS Poll released prior to the game; All times are in Eastern time
