= 2001 Georgetown Hoyas football team =

American college football season

2001 Georgetown Hoyas football
- Conference: Patriot League
- Record: 3–7 (0–6 Patriot)
- Head coach: Bob Benson (9th season)
- Captains: Brian Blankenship; Aaron Brown; Scott Pogorelec
- Home stadium: Kehoe Field

2001 Patriot League football standings
	Conf.			Overall
Team	W		L	W		L
No. 5 Lehigh $^	7	–	0	11	–	1
Colgate	5	–	1	7	–	3
Fordham	5	–	2	7	–	4
Bucknell	4	–	3	6	–	4
Holy Cross	3	–	4	4	–	6
Towson	2	–	5	3	–	7
Lafayette	1	–	6	2	–	8
Georgetown	0	–	6	3	–	7
$ – Conference champion; ^ – NCAA Division I-AA playoff participant; Rankings from The Sports Network poll

The 2001 Georgetown Hoyas football team was an American football team that represented Georgetown University during the 2001 NCAA Division I-AA football season. In their first season in the Patriot League, the Hoyas finished last.

In their ninth year under head coach Bob Benson, the Hoyas compiled a 3–7 record. Brian Blankenship, Aaron Brown and Scott Pogorelec were the team captains.

This was Georgetown's first year as a football associate member of the Patriot League; the university announced it would switch its football affiliation from the Metro Atlantic Athletic Conference to the Patriot League in January 2000, but competed as a Division I-AA independent that season, and did not officially join its new league until 2001.

Despite playing a league schedule, Georgetown was able to arrange matchups with only six of its seven league-mates, missing Colgate. Half of the league consisted of teams the Hoyas had not faced in decades, or at all. Georgetown had scheduled Bucknell on its independent schedule in 2000, and had faced fellow Jesuit colleges Fordham and Holy Cross as non-league opponents almost every year since 1996. But before 2001, Georgetown had last faced Towson in 1970, Lafayette in 1937 and Lehigh in 1925. The matchup between Georgetown and Colgate in 2002 would be the first one ever.

Like most of the Patriot League, Georgetown played just 10 of its 11 scheduled games, after its September 15 matchup, against MAAC member Wagner, was canceled following the September 11 attacks.

Georgetown played its home games at Kehoe Field on the university campus in Washington, D.C.

== Schedule ==
Date	Opponent	Site	Result	Attendance	Source
September 1	No. 10 Lehigh	Kehoe Field; Washington, DC	L 14–41	2,512	
September 8	at Holy Cross	Fitton Field; Worcester, MA	L 7–33	8,176	
September 15	Wagner*	Kehoe Field; Washington, DC	Canceled		
September 29	at Fordham	Coffey Field; Bronx, NY	L 13–48	6,425	
October 6	Duquesne*	Kehoe Field; Washington, DC	W 15–13		
October 13	Davidson*	Kehoe Field; Washington, DC	W 26–24	1,765	
October 20	at Bucknell	Christy Mathewson–Memorial Stadium; Lewisburg, PA	L 0–34	8,050	
October 27	at Marist*	Leonidoff Field; Poughkeepsie, NY	L 35–38 ^{OT}		
November 3	at San Diego*	Torero Stadium; San Diego, CA	W 24–21		
November 10	Lafayette	Kehoe Field; Washington, DC	L 17–37	1,786	
November 17	Towson	Kehoe Field; Washington, DC	L 9–27	2,201	
*Non-conference game; Rankings from The Sports Network Poll released prior to the game
