= 2001 Bucknell Bison football team =

American college football season

2001 Bucknell Bison football
- Conference: Patriot League
- Record: 6–4 (4–3 Patriot)
- Head coach: Tom Gadd (7th season)
- Captains: Carson Book; Jabu Powell; Mark Tallman; Reed Tunison
- Home stadium: Christy Mathewson–Memorial Stadium

2001 Patriot League football standings
	Conf.			Overall
Team	W		L	W		L
No. 5 Lehigh $^	7	–	0	11	–	1
Colgate	5	–	1	7	–	3
Fordham	5	–	2	7	–	4
Bucknell	4	–	3	6	–	4
Holy Cross	3	–	4	4	–	6
Towson	2	–	5	3	–	7
Lafayette	1	–	6	2	–	8
Georgetown	0	–	6	3	–	7
$ – Conference champion; ^ – NCAA Division I-AA playoff participant; Rankings from The Sports Network poll

The 2001 Bucknell Bison football team was an American football team that represented Bucknell University during the 2001 NCAA Division I-AA football season.

Bucknell finished fourth in the Patriot League.

During its seventh and final year under head coach Tom Gadd, the Bison compiled a 6–4 record. Carson Book, Jabu Powell, Mark Tallman and Reed Tunison were the team captains.

The Bison outscored opponents 240 to 157. Bucknell's 4–3 conference record placed the team fourth out of eight in the Patriot League standings.

Like most of the Patriot League, Bucknell played just ten of its eleven scheduled games, after its September 15 matchup, against Ivy League opponent Cornell, was canceled following the September 11 attacks.

Bucknell played its home games at Christy Mathewson–Memorial Stadium on the university campus in Lewisburg, Pennsylvania.

== Schedule ==
Date	Opponent	Site	Result	Attendance	Source
September 8	at Kent State*	Dix Stadium; Kent, OH	L 17–38	6,872	
September 15	at Cornell*	Schoellkopf Field; Ithaca, NY	Canceled		
September 22	at Columbia*	Wien Stadium; New York, NY	W 23–20 ^{OT}	3,116	
September 29	Saint Mary's^*	Christy Mathewson–Memorial Stadium; Lewisburg, PA	W 38–6		
October 6	Towson	Christy Mathewson–Memorial Stadium; Lewisburg, PA	W 51–10	2,897	
October 13	at Lafayette	Fisher Field; Easton, PA	W 17–16		
October 20	Georgetown^{†}	Christy Mathewson–Memorial Stadium; Lewisburg, PA	W 34–0	8,050	
October 27	at Fordham	Coffey Field; Bronx, NY	L 12–17		
November 3	Holy Cross	Christy Mathewson–Memorial Stadium; Lewisburg, PA	W 21–14	2,743	
November 10	No. 7 Lehigh	Christy Mathewson–Memorial Stadium; Lewisburg, PA	L 14–21		
November 17	at Colgate	Andy Kerr Stadium; Hamilton, NY	L 13–15		
*Non-conference game; ^{†}Homecoming; ^ Parents Weekend; Rankings from The Sports Network Poll released prior to the game
