= 2015 Georgetown Hoyas football team =

American college football season

2015 Georgetown Hoyas football
- Conference: Patriot League
- Record: 4–7 (2–4 Patriot)
- Head coach: Rob Sgarlata (2nd season)
- Offensive coordinator: Michael Neuberger (2nd season)
- Defensive coordinator: Luke Thompson (2nd season)
- Home stadium: Multi-Sport Field

2015 Patriot League football standings
| | Conf. | | | Overall |
| Team | W | | L | W | | L |
|---|---|---|---|---|---|---|
| No. 17 Colgate $^ | 6 | – | 0 | 9 | – | 5 |
| No. 19 Fordham ^ | 5 | – | 1 | 9 | – | 3 |
| Lehigh | 4 | – | 2 | 6 | – | 5 |
| Holy Cross | 3 | – | 3 | 6 | – | 5 |
| Georgetown | 2 | – | 4 | 4 | – | 7 |
| Bucknell | 1 | – | 5 | 4 | – | 7 |
| Lafayette | 0 | – | 6 | 1 | – | 10 |
$ – Conference champion; ^ – FCS playoff participant; Rankings from STATS Poll

The 2015 Georgetown Hoyas football team represented Georgetown University as a member of the Patriot League during the 2015 NCAA Division I FCS football season. Led by second-year head coach Rob Sgarlata, the Hoyas compiled an overall record of 4–7 with a mark of 2–4 in conference play, placing fifth in the Patriot League. Georgetown played home games at Multi-Sport Field in Washington, D.C.

== Schedule ==
| Date | Time | Opponent | Site | TV | Result | Attendance |
|---|---|---|---|---|---|---|
| September 5 | 12:00 pm | at Saint Francis (PA)* | DeGol Field; Loretto, PA | | L 20–48 | 1,836 |
| September 12 | 6:00 pm | Marist* | Multi-Sport Field; Washington, DC | | W 34–7 | 1,087 |
| September 19 | 12:00 pm | Dartmouth* | Multi-Sport Field; Washington, DC | PLN | L 10–31 | 2,863 |
| September 26 | 1:00 pm | at Columbia* | Robert K. Kraft Field at Lawrence A. Wien Stadium; New York, NY (Lou Little Cup) | | W 24–16 | 5,175 |
| October 2 | 7:00 pm | at No. 24 Harvard* | Harvard Stadium; Boston, MA | ESPN3 | L 0–45 | 7,566 |
| October 10 | 2:00 pm | Lafayette^{†} | Multi-Sport Field; Washington, DC | | W 38–7 | 3,104 |
| October 17 | 12:00 pm | Colgate | Multi-Sport Field; Washington, DC | | L 13–17 | 3,136 |
| October 24 | 1:00 pm | at Bucknell | Christy Mathewson–Memorial Stadium; Lewisburg, PA | | W 17–9 | 3,429 |
| October 31 | 12:30 pm | at Lehigh | Goodman Stadium; Bethlehem, PA | PLN | L 28–33 | 7,950 |
| November 14 | 12:00 pm | No. 16 Fordham | Multi-Sport Field; Washington, DC | | L 31–38 | 2,219 |
| November 21 | 12:05 pm | Holy Cross | Multi-Sport Field; Washington, DC | | L 7–45 | 5,785 |
*Non-conference game; ^{†}Homecoming; Rankings from STATS Poll released prior to the game; All times are in Eastern time
