= Tom Gilmore (American football) =

America football player and coach (born 1964)

Biographical details
- Born: September 25, 1964 (age 62); Philadelphia, Pennsylvania, U.S.
- Education: University of Pennsylvania

Playing career
- 1982–1985: Penn
- 1986: BC Lions
- 1988: New York Knights
- Position: Defensive lineman

Coaching career (HC unless noted)
- 1986: Penn (GA)
- 1987–1989: Columbia (DL)
- 1990–1991: Penn (OL)
- 1992–1995: Dartmouth (OL)
- 1996: Dartmouth (LB)
- 1997–1999: Dartmouth (DC)
- 2000–2003: Lehigh (DC)
- 2004–2017: Holy Cross
- 2018: Wake Forest (OLB)
- 2019–2022: Lehigh

Head coaching record
- Overall: 81–108 (.429)
- Tournaments: 0–1 (.000) (NCAA D-I playoffs)

Accomplishments and honors

Championships
- Patriot (2009)

Awards
- Ivy League Player of the Year (1985); NFF & College Hall of Fame Scholar-Athlete (1985); AFCA Assistant Coach of the Year (2001); 2× Patriot League Coach of the Year (2006, 2009); New England Coach of the Year (2009)

Tom Gilmore (born September 25, 1964) is an American college football coach and former player. He was head coach of the Holy Cross Crusaders from 2004 to 2017 and the Lehigh University Mountain Hawks from 2019 to 2022.

== Early life and education ==
Gilmore was born in Philadelphia to Ireland-born parents Jack Gilmore and Sarah "Sadie" (Boyce) Gilmore. He has four siblings, John, Jim (an Ohio State and NFL player), Mike (a Lycoming College Athletic Hall of Fame member), and Mary Ann (LaSalle University).

Gilmore attended St. Bartholomew Parish grade school and then Northeast Catholic High School for Boys, where he was selected to the All-Catholic League teams in football, wrestling, and track and field and to the Philadelphia All-City teams in football and wrestling. He graduated in 1982 from Northeast Catholic with high honors and received the school's most prestigious award, The Provincial's Medal of Honor. He was inducted into the Northeast Catholic Alumni Hall of Fame in 2014, Wrestling Hall of Fame in 2009 and Football Hall of Fame in 2014. He received the Travis Manion Career Achievement Award from the Philadelphia Catholic League in 2024.

Gilmore attended the University of Pennsylvania and played football for the Penn Quakers. He graduated from Penn in 1986, with a bachelor's degree in computer mathematics.

=== College Football Career ===
Gilmore was a defensive lineman for the Penn Quakers. He also played one summer for the British Columbia Lions of the Canadian Football League and one summer for the New York Knights of the Arena Football League.

As a college football player at Penn, he was a four-time Ivy League champion. He established new school career records for quarterback sacks and tackles for loss and received numerous team awards, including the George Munger Award (Team MVP) and the Chuck Bednarik Award (Top Lineman). He was named team captain in 1985 and won the Asa S. Bushnell Award as the Ivy League Player of the Year, one of only two linemen to ever win the honor before it was divided into separate awards for Offense and Defense in 2012. He was selected three times to All-Ivy League teams, two times to All-East teams, and twice to All-American teams.

Also an Academic All-American, he received Penn's top male scholar-athlete award at graduation and was selected as one of the 12 members of the National Football Foundation and College Football Hall of Fame Scholar-Athlete Team in December 1985. He was named to the University of Pennsylvania Football All-Time Team in 2020, to its All-Century Team in 2000, and was inducted into the Penn Athletics Hall of Fame in 2017.

== College Football Coaching Career ==
Gilmore served as an assistant coach at the University of Pennsylvania, Columbia University, Dartmouth College, Lehigh University, and Wake Forest University. His first stint as a college football head coach was with the College of the Holy Cross, where he is second on the program's all-time coaching wins list. At Holy Cross, he took over a program that suffered 10 losing seasons in the previous 11 years and turned in a winning season in just his second year. His teams progressively improved, just narrowly missing three championships by a total of 5 points before claiming a Patriot League title in 2009. That 2009 team lost to eventual national champion Villanova in the national playoffs and completed the season ranked 14th nationally. Gilmore was named the New England Coach of the Year and was twice named the Patriot League Coach of the Year while at Holy Cross.

From 2019 to 2022, Gilmore was the head coach of Lehigh University.

== Head coaching record ==
Year	Team	Overall	Conference	Standing	Bowl/playoffs
Holy Cross Crusaders (Patriot League) (2004–2017)
2004	Holy Cross	3–8	1–5	6th	
2005	Holy Cross	6–5	3–3	4th	
2006	Holy Cross	7–4	4–2	3rd	
2007	Holy Cross	7–4	4–2	2nd	
2008	Holy Cross	7–4	5–1	2nd	
2009	Holy Cross	9–3	5–1	1st	L NCAA Division I First Round
2010	Holy Cross	6–5	4–2	T–2nd	
2011	Holy Cross	6–5	4–2	2nd	
2012	Holy Cross	2–9	2–4	4th	
2013	Holy Cross	3–9	1–5	T–6th	
2014	Holy Cross	4–8	2–4	T–5th	
2015	Holy Cross	6–5	3–3	4th	
2016	Holy Cross	4–7	2–4	6th	
2017	Holy Cross	2–5	1–1		
Holy Cross:		72–81	41–40		
Lehigh Mountain Hawks (Patriot League) (2019–2022)
2019	Lehigh	4–7	3–3	T–3rd	
2020–21	Lehigh	0–3	0–3	3rd (South)	
2021	Lehigh	3–8	3–3	4th	
2022	Lehigh	2–9	2–4	T–4th	
Lehigh:		9–27	8–13		
Total:		81–108			
National championship Conference title Conference division title or championship game berth
