= 2001 Holy Cross Crusaders football team =

American college football season

2001 Holy Cross Crusaders football
- Conference: Patriot League
- Record: 4–6 (3–4 Patriot)
- Head coach: Dan Allen (6th season)
- Captains: Brian Hall; James Jenkins; Vernell Shaw
- Home stadium: Fitton Field

2001 Patriot League football standings
	Conf.			Overall
Team	W		L	W		L
No. 5 Lehigh $^	7	–	0	11	–	1
Colgate	5	–	1	7	–	3
Fordham	5	–	2	7	–	4
Bucknell	4	–	3	6	–	4
Holy Cross	3	–	4	4	–	6
Towson	2	–	5	3	–	7
Lafayette	1	–	6	2	–	8
Georgetown	0	–	6	3	–	7
$ – Conference champion; ^ – NCAA Division I-AA playoff participant; Rankings from The Sports Network poll

The 2001 Holy Cross Crusaders football team was an American football team that represented the College of the Holy Cross during the 2001 NCAA Division I-AA football season. Holy Cross finished fifth in the Patriot League.

In their sixth year under head coach Dan Allen, the Crusaders compiled a 4–6 record. Brian Hall, James Jenkins and Vernell Shaw were the team captains.

The Crusaders outscored opponents 247 to 179. Holy Cross' 3–4 conference record placed fifth out of eight in the Patriot League standings.

Like most of the Patriot League, Holy Cross played just 10 of its 11 scheduled games, after its September 15 matchup, against Ivy League opponent Harvard, was canceled following the September 11 attacks. It was the first year in more than two decades without a Crimson-Crusader football game, and the only year between 1981 and 2015 without the intrastate matchup.

Holy Cross played its home games at Fitton Field on the college campus in Worcester, Massachusetts.

== Schedule ==
Date	Opponent	Site	Result	Attendance	Source
September 8	Georgetown	Fitton Field; Worcester, MA	W 33–7	8,176	
September 15	Harvard*	Fitton Field; Worcester, MA	Canceled		
September 22	at Towson	Minnegan Stadium; Towson, MD	W 17–9	2,095	
September 29	Yale*	Fitton Field; Worcester, MA	L 22–23	8,547	
October 6	at Penn*	Franklin Field; Philadelphia, PA	L 7–43	11,722	
October 13	Dartmouth^{†}*	Fitton Field; Worcester, MA	W 49–17	8,817	
October 20	Lafayette^	Fitton Field; Worcester, MA	W 63–53	13,219	
October 27	at No. 8 Lehigh	Goodman Stadium; Bethlehem, PA	L 14–47	14,232	
November 3	at Bucknell	Christy Mathewson–Memorial Stadium; Lewisburg, PA	L 14–21	2,743	
November 10	Colgate	Fitton Field; Worcester, MA	L 7–35	9,135	
November 17	at Fordham	Coffey Field; Bronx, NY (rivalry)	L 21–24	6,537	
*Non-conference game; ^{†}Homecoming; ^ Family Weekend; Rankings from The Sports Network Poll released prior to the game
