= 2015 Colgate Raiders football team =

American college football season

2015 Colgate Raiders football

Patriot League champion

FCS Playoffs Quarterfinal, L 21–48 vs. Sam Houston State
- Conference: Patriot League

Ranking
- STATS: No. 17
- FCS Coaches: No. 13
- Record: 9–5 (6–0 Patriot)
- Head coach: Dan Hunt (2nd season)
- Offensive coordinator: Chris Young (2nd season)
- Defensive coordinator: Paul Shaffner (3rd season)
- Home stadium: Crown Field at Andy Kerr Stadium

2015 Patriot League football standings
| | Conf. | | | Overall |
| Team | W | | L | W | | L |
|---|---|---|---|---|---|---|
| No. 17 Colgate $^ | 6 | – | 0 | 9 | – | 5 |
| No. 19 Fordham ^ | 5 | – | 1 | 9 | – | 3 |
| Lehigh | 4 | – | 2 | 6 | – | 5 |
| Holy Cross | 3 | – | 3 | 6 | – | 5 |
| Georgetown | 2 | – | 4 | 4 | – | 7 |
| Bucknell | 1 | – | 5 | 4 | – | 7 |
| Lafayette | 0 | – | 6 | 1 | – | 10 |
$ – Conference champion; ^ – FCS playoff participant; Rankings from STATS Poll

The 2015 Colgate Raiders football team represented Colgate University in the 2015 NCAA Division I FCS football season. Colgate University is a member of the Patriot League, an athletic conference of the NCAA Division I Football Championship Subdivision. The team played their home games at Crown Field at Andy Kerr Stadium (capacity: 10,221).

The Raiders were led by second-year head coach Dan Hunt and team captains Cameron Buttermore (a three-year starter at Inside Linebacker), John Weber (a two-year starter at Offensive Tackle) and Victor Steffen (suffered season-ending injury in second game of season) (Defensive Lineman), and finished the season with an overall 9–5 record (and an undefeated 6-0 in Patriot League play), winning the Patriot League championship game at Crown Field at Andy Kerr Stadium (capacity: 10,221) against Lehigh University football team, earning the Patriot League's automatic bid to the FCS Playoffs and beginning a deep run into the FCS Playoffs, defeating New Hampshire and James Madison before losing to Sam Houston State in the quarterfinal round (Final 8) of the FCS Playoffs.

2015 Colgate Football Schedule Sept. 5 at Navy Noon Sept. 12 NEW HAMPSHIRE 6 p.m. Sept. 19 YALE (Homecoming) 1 p.m. Sept. 26 at Holy Cross * TBA Oct. 2 at Cornell 7 p.m. Oct. 10 at Princeton TBA Oct. 17 at Georgetown * TBA Oct. 31 FORDHAM * (Family Weekend) 1 p.m. Nov. 7 at Lafayette * TBA Nov. 14 LEHIGH * 1 p.m. Nov. 21 BUCKNELL * 1 p.m.

Pre-Season poll: 2015 Patriot League Football 1. Fordham 66 points (10 first-place votes) 2. Bucknell 63 points (4 first-place votes) 3. COLGATE 48 points 4. Lafayette 44 points 5. Lehigh 31 points 6. Holy Cross 29 points 7. Georgetown 13 points

== Schedule ==
| Date | Time | Opponent | Site | TV | Result | Attendance |
|---|---|---|---|---|---|---|
| September 5 | 12:00 pm | at Navy* | Navy–Marine Corps Memorial Stadium; Annapolis, MD | CBSSN | L 10–48 | 28,015 |
| September 12 | 6:00 pm | No. 12 New Hampshire* | Crown Field at Andy Kerr Stadium; Hamilton, NY | | L 8–26 | 2,988 |
| September 19 | 1:00 pm | Yale*^{†} | Crown Field at Andy Kerr Stadium; Hamilton, NY | TWCSC | L 28–29 | 7,343 |
| September 26 | 12:00 pm | at Holy Cross | Fitton Field; Worcester, MA | ASN | W 31–14 | 9,368 |
| October 2 | 7:00 pm | at Cornell* | Schoellkopf Field; Ithaca, NY (rivalry) | | W 28–21 | 9,103 |
| October 10 | 1:00 pm | at Princeton* | Powers Field at Princeton Stadium; Princeton, NJ | | L 20–44 | 6,457 |
| October 17 | 12:00 pm | at Georgetown | Multi-Sport Field; Washington, D.C. | | W 17–13 | 3,136 |
| October 31 | 1:00 pm | No. 11 Fordham | Crown Field at Andy Kerr Stadium; Hamilton, NY | PLL | W 31–29 | 7,879 |
| November 7 | 1:00 pm | at Lafayette | Fisher Stadium; Easton, PA | | W 28–19 | 4,485 |
| November 14 | 1:00 pm | Lehigh | Crown Field at Andy Kerr Stadium; Hamilton, NY | TWCSC | W 49–42 | 3,828 |
| November 21 | 1:00 pm | Bucknell | Crown Field at Andy Kerr Stadium; Hamilton, NY | PLL | W 14–10 | 2,970 |
| November 28 | 3:30 pm | at New Hampshire* | Cowell Stadium; Durham, NH (NCAA Division I First Round) | ESPN3 | W 27–20 | 3,303 |
| December 5 | 1:00 pm | at No. 8 James Madison* | Bridgeforth Stadium; Harrisonburg, VA (NCAA Division I Second Round) | ESPN3 | W 44–38 | 15,045 |
| December 12 | 12:00 pm | at No. 6 Sam Houston State* | Bowers Stadium; Huntsville, TX (NCAA Division I Quarterfinal) | ESPN3 | L 21–48 | 5,074 |
*Non-conference game; ^{†}Homecoming; Rankings from STATS Poll released prior to the game; All times are in Eastern time
