= 2015 Bucknell Bison football team =

American college football season

2015 Bucknell Bison football
- Conference: Patriot League
- Record: 4–7 (1–5 Patriot)
- Head coach: Joe Susan (6th season)
- Offensive coordinator: Mike O'Connor
- Defensive coordinator: Matt Borich
- Home stadium: Christy Mathewson–Memorial Stadium

2015 Patriot League football standings
	Conf.			Overall
Team	W		L	W		L
No. 17 Colgate $^	6	–	0	9	–	5
No. 19 Fordham ^	5	–	1	9	–	3
Lehigh	4	–	2	6	–	5
Holy Cross	3	–	3	6	–	5
Georgetown	2	–	4	4	–	7
Bucknell	1	–	5	4	–	7
Lafayette	0	–	6	1	–	10
$ – Conference champion; ^ – FCS playoff participant; Rankings from STATS Poll

The 2015 Bucknell Bison football team represented Bucknell University in the 2015 NCAA Division I FCS football season. They were led by sixth-year head coach Joe Susan and played their home games at Christy Mathewson–Memorial Stadium. They were a member of the Patriot League. They finished the season 4–7, 1–5 in Patriot League play to finish in sixth place.

== Schedule ==
Date	Time	Opponent	Site	TV	Result	Attendance
September 5	6:00 pm	Marist*	Christy Mathewson–Memorial Stadium; Lewisburg, PA		W 17–0	4,519
September 12	6:00 pm	Duquesne*	Christy Mathewson–Memorial Stadium; Lewisburg, PA	PLL	L 7–26	2,123
September 19	3:00 pm	at Cornell*	Schoellkopf Field; Ithaca, NY		W 19–14	16,057
October 3	1:30 pm	at VMI*	Alumni Memorial Field; Lexington, VA		W 28–22 ^{OT}	3,713
October 10	1:00 pm	Lehigh	Christy Mathewson–Memorial Stadium; Lewisburg, PA		L 10–21	4,196
October 17	12:00 pm	at Army*	Michie Stadium; West Point, NY	CBSSN	L 14–21	33,257
October 24	1:00 pm	Georgetown^{†}	Christy Mathewson–Memorial Stadium; Lewisburg, PA		L 9–17	3,429
October 31	3:30 pm	at Lafayette	Fisher Stadium; Easton, PA	ASN	W 35–24	5,783
November 7	1:00 pm	at No. 16 Fordham	Coffey Field; Bronx, NY		L 16–24	9,192
November 14	1:00 pm	Holy Cross	Christy Mathewson–Memorial Stadium; Lewisburg, PA	PLL	L 7–23	2,011
November 21	1:00 pm	at Colgate	Crown Field at Andy Kerr Stadium; Hamilton, NY	PLL	L 10–14	2,970
*Non-conference game; ^{†}Homecoming; Rankings from STATS Poll released prior to the game; All times are in Eastern time

== Game summaries ==
=== Marist ===
	1	2	3	4	Total
Red Foxes	0	0	0	0	0
Bison	3	0	14	0	17

=== Duquesne ===
	1	2	3	4	Total
Dukes	6	7	6	7	26
Bison	0	0	0	7	7

=== At Cornell ===
	1	2	3	4	Total
Bison	0	7	3	9	19
Big Red	0	7	0	7	14

=== At VMI ===
	1	2	3	4	OT	Total
Bison	7	0	0	15	6	28
Keydets	7	6	0	9	0	22

=== Lehigh ===
	1	2	3	4	Total
Mountain Hawks	7	7	7	0	21
Bison	7	0	3	0	10

=== At Army ===
	1	2	3	4	Total
Bison	0	14	0	0	14
Black Knights	0	7	7	7	21

=== Georgetown ===
	1	2	3	4	Total
Hoyas	10	0	0	7	17
Bison	6	3	0	0	9

=== At Lafayette ===
	1	2	3	4	Total
Bison	0	14	7	14	35
Leopards	14	3	0	7	24

=== At Fordham ===
	1	2	3	4	Total
Bison	7	3	0	6	16
#16 Rams	7	3	7	7	24

=== Holy Cross ===
	1	2	3	4	Total
Crusaders	13	7	0	3	23
Bison	0	0	7	0	7

=== At Colgate ===
	1	2	3	4	Total
Bison	0	0	7	3	10
Raiders	0	14	0	0	14
