= 2001 Fordham Rams football team =

American college football season

2001 Fordham Rams football
- Conference: Patriot League
- Record: 7–4 (5–2 Patriot)
- Head coach: Dave Clawson (3rd season)
- Offensive coordinator: Ed Foley (3rd season)
- Defensive coordinator: Dave Cohen (3rd season)
- Captains: Chris Breen; Maurice Briscoe; Tony Downs; Mark Manno; Joe Wyda
- Home stadium: Coffey Field

2001 Patriot League football standings
	Conf.			Overall
Team	W		L	W		L
No. 5 Lehigh $^	7	–	0	11	–	1
Colgate	5	–	1	7	–	3
Fordham	5	–	2	7	–	4
Bucknell	4	–	3	6	–	4
Holy Cross	3	–	4	4	–	6
Towson	2	–	5	3	–	7
Lafayette	1	–	6	2	–	8
Georgetown	0	–	6	3	–	7
$ – Conference champion; ^ – NCAA Division I-AA playoff participant; Rankings from The Sports Network poll

The 2001 Fordham Rams football team was an American football team that represented Fordham University during the 2001 NCAA Division I-AA football season. Fordham finished third in the Patriot League.

In their third year under head coach Dave Clawson, the Rams compiled a 7–4 record. Chris Breen, Maurice Briscoe, Tony Downs, Mark Manno and Joe Wyda were the team captains. This was Fordham's first season with an overall winning record since joining the Patriot League in 1990.

The Rams outscored opponents 329 to 243. Their 5–2 conference record placed third in the Patriot League standings, half a game behind second place. The 5–1 Colgate Raiders played fewer league games because they did not match up against the newest member of the conference, Georgetown, while Fordham did.

When the September 11 attacks disrupted the following weekend's college football games, Fordham was the last Patriot League member to cancel its scheduled game, making the announcement on Friday afternoon just 24 hours before kickoff. The Rams and crosstown rival Columbia Lions had initially hoped to play the game as a sign of New York City resiliency.

Unlike the other Patriot League teams, which played a 10-game schedule in 2001, Fordham chose to reschedule and play the Columbia matchup at the end of the year, on Thursday, November 22. This was the first time since the "Seven Blocks of Granite" era that Fordham had played a game on Thanksgiving Day; that 1936 season-ender was also against a local opponent, New York University.

Fordham played its home games at Jack Coffey Field on the university campus in The Bronx, in New York City.

== Schedule ==
Date	Opponent	Site	Result	Attendance	Source
September 8	at Fairfield	Alumni Stadium; Fairfield, CT	W 46–14	1,776	
September 15	Columbia*	Coffey Field; Bronx, NY (rivalry)	Postponed		
September 22	at Colgate	Andy Kerr Stadium; Hamilton, NY	L 9–21	7,028	
September 29	Georgetown^{†}	Coffey Field; Bronx, NY	W 48–13	6,425	
October 6	at Brown*	Brown Stadium; Providence, RI	L 23–40	4,441	
October 13	at Yale*	Yale Bowl; New Haven, CT	L 27–36	18,580	
October 20	No. 7 Lehigh	Coffey Field; Bronx, NY	L 21–31		
October 27	Bucknell	Coffey Field; Bronx, NY	W 17–12		
November 3	at Lafayette	Fisher Field; Easton, PA	W 45–24	3,981	
November 10	at Towson	Minnegan Stadium; Towson, MD	W 28–23	3,568	
November 17	Holy Cross	Coffey Field; Bronx, NY (rivalry)	W 24–21	6,537	
November 22	Columbia*	Coffey Field; Bronx, NY (rivalry)	W 41–10	3,715	
*Non-conference game; ^{†}Homecoming; Rankings from The Sports Network Poll released prior to the game
