= 2015 Lafayette Leopards football team =

American college football season

2015 Lafayette Leopards football
- Conference: Patriot League
- Record: 1–10 (0–6 Patriot)
- Head coach: Frank Tavani (16th season)
- Offensive coordinator: Mickey Fein (7th season)
- Defensive coordinator: Art Link (2nd season)
- Home stadium: Fisher Stadium

2015 Patriot League football standings
	Conf.			Overall
Team	W		L	W		L
No. 17 Colgate $^	6	–	0	9	–	5
No. 19 Fordham ^	5	–	1	9	–	3
Lehigh	4	–	2	6	–	5
Holy Cross	3	–	3	6	–	5
Georgetown	2	–	4	4	–	7
Bucknell	1	–	5	4	–	7
Lafayette	0	–	6	1	–	10
$ – Conference champion; ^ – FCS playoff participant; Rankings from STATS Poll

The 2015 Lafayette Leopards football team represented Lafayette College as member of the Patriot League during the 2015 NCAA Division I FCS football season. Led by 16th-year head coach Frank Tavani, the Leopards compiled an overall record of 1–10 with a mark of 0–6 in conference play, placing last out of seven teams in the Patriot League. Lafayette played home games at Fisher Field in Easton, Pennsylvania.

== Schedule ==
Date	Time	Opponent	Site	TV	Result	Attendance
September 5	6:00 pm	William & Mary*	Fisher Stadium; Easton, PA	LSN	L 7–34	7,647
September 12	6:00 pm	at Delaware*	Delaware Stadium; Newark, DE	LSN	L 9–19	12,809
September 19	6:00 pm	Princeton*	Fisher Stadium; Easton, PA	LSN	L 7–40	9,173
September 26	6:00 pm	at Wagner*	Wagner College Stadium; Staten Island, NY	LSN	W 35–24	2,691
October 3	6:00 pm	No. 15 Fordham	Fisher Stadium; Easton, PA	LSN	L 7–35	3,774
October 10	2:00 pm	at Georgetown	Multi-Sport Field; Washington, DC		L 7–38	3,104
October 17	3:30 pm	No. 18 Harvard^{†}	Fisher Stadium; Easton, PA	PLN	L 0–42	7,108
October 24	1:00 pm	at Holy Cross	Fitton Field; Worcester, MA	LSN	L 0–42	10,725
October 31	3:30 pm	Bucknell	Fisher Stadium; Easton, PA	ASN	L 24–35	5,783
November 7	1:00 pm	Colgate	Fisher Stadium; Easton, PA	LSN	L 19–28	4,485
November 21	12:30 pm	at Lehigh	Goodman Stadium; Bethlehem, PA (The Rivalry)		L 35–49	15,921
*Non-conference game; ^{†}Homecoming; Rankings from STATS Poll released prior to the game; All times are in Eastern time
