= 2015 Holy Cross Crusaders football team =

American college football season

2015 Holy Cross Crusaders football
- Conference: Patriot League
- Record: 6–5 (3–3 Patriot)
- Head coach: Tom Gilmore (12th season)
- Offensive coordinator: Brian Rock (1st season)
- Defensive coordinator: Mike Kashurba (2nd season)
- Home stadium: Fitton Field

2015 Patriot League football standings
	Conf.			Overall
Team	W		L	W		L
No. 17 Colgate $^	6	–	0	9	–	5
No. 19 Fordham ^	5	–	1	9	–	3
Lehigh	4	–	2	6	–	5
Holy Cross	3	–	3	6	–	5
Georgetown	2	–	4	4	–	7
Bucknell	1	–	5	4	–	7
Lafayette	0	–	6	1	–	10
$ – Conference champion; ^ – FCS playoff participant; Rankings from STATS Poll

The 2015 Holy Cross Crusaders football team represented the College of the Holy Cross in the 2015 NCAA Division I FCS football season. They were led by 12th-year head coach Tom Gilmore and played their home games at Fitton Field. They were a member of the Patriot League. They finished the season 6–5, 3–3 in Patriot League play to finish in fourth place.

== Schedule ==
Date	Time	Opponent	Site	TV	Result	Attendance
September 5	1:00 pm	at Monmouth*	Kessler Field; West Long Branch, NJ	ESPN3	W 27–19	3,081
September 19	6:00 pm	at Towson*	Johnny Unitas Stadium; Towson, MD		L 26–29	5,682
September 26	12:05 pm	Colgate^{†}	Fitton Field; Worcester, MA	ASN	L 14–31	9,368
October 3	1:05 pm	Albany*	Fitton Field; Worcester, MA	PLL	W 37–0	3,841
October 10	1:05 pm	Brown*	Fitton Field; Worcester, MA	WCTR	L 24–25	4,673
October 17	1:00 pm	at No. 10 Fordham	Coffey Field; Bronx, NY (Ram–Crusader Cup)		L 41–47 ^{OT}	6,825
October 24	1:05 pm	Lafayette	Fitton Field; Worcester, MA	WCTR	W 42–0	10,725
October 31	1:05 pm	Bryant*	Fitton Field; Worcester, MA	WCTR	W 34–33	4,748
November 7	12:30 pm	at Lehigh	Goodman Stadium; Bethlehem, PA	PLL	L 38–51	5,732
November 14	1:00 pm	at Bucknell	Christy Mathewson–Memorial Stadium; Lewisburg, PA	PLL	W 23–7	2,011
November 21	12:05 pm	Georgetown	Fitton Field; Worcester, MA		W 45–7	5,785
*Non-conference game; ^{†}Homecoming; Rankings from STATS Poll released prior to the game; All times are in Eastern time

== Roster ==
2015 Holy Cross Crusaders football team roster
Players
Coaches
Offense

Pos.	#	Name	Class
QB	6	Peter Pujals	Jr
WR	7	Kalif Raymond	Sr

Defense

Pos.	#	Name	Class

Special teams

Pos.	#	Name	Class

Head coach

- Tom Gilmore

Coordinators/assistant coaches

Legend

- (C) Team captain
- (S) Suspended
- (I) Ineligible
- Injured
- Redshirt

Roster
