= College Football on CBS Sports =

American live sports television program

- Also known as: SEC on CBS (1996–2023); Mountain West on CBS (since 2020); Big Ten on CBS (since 2023); Pac-12 on CBS (since 2025)
- Genre: American college football game telecasts
- Presented by: Brad Nessler; Charles Davis; Jenny Dell; Adam Zucker; Rick Neuheisel; Brian Jones; Aaron Taylor; Gene Steratore
- Theme music composer: Lloyd Landesman
- Country of origin: United States
- Original language: English
- No. of seasons: 77 (through 2026 season)

Production
- Production locations: Various NCAA stadiums (game telecasts); CBS Broadcast Center; New York City (pre-game, halftime and post-game shows)
- Camera setup: Multi-camera
- Running time: 210 minutes or until game ends (inc. adverts)
- Production companies: National Collegiate Athletic Association; CBS Sports

Original release
- Network: CBS; CBSSN; Paramount+
- Release: December 2, 1950 – present

College Football on CBS Sports is the de facto title used for broadcasts of NCAA college football games produced by CBS Sports for CBS, CBS Sports Network and Paramount+.

CBS first televised regular season college football games in 1950, airing them on a weekly basis during periods in the 1950s and 1960s. After ABC won an exclusive contract with the NCAA in 1966, CBS then retained the rights to air a few bowl games before returning to broadcast regular season games from the major conferences and major independents in 1982.

After being outbid by ABC, CBS's college football coverage between 1991 and 1995 was again reduced to only a handful of bowl games. In 1996, CBS signed a deal with the Southeastern Conference (SEC) to carry a weekly slate of regular season games (billed as the SEC on CBS), as well as becoming the television partner for the annual Army–Navy Game. In 2019, CBS declined to renew its rights to SEC football, with the package ultimately going to ABC beginning in 2024. CBS subsequently reached a deal to televise Big Ten football beginning in 2023, which replaced CBS's SEC package in its traditional 3:30 p.m. ET timeslot beginning in the 2024 season. As part of a title sponsorship by The Home Depot, college football games on the main CBS network are currently billed as The Home Depot Big Ten on CBS (or The Home Depot College Football on CBS for non-Big Ten games).

CBS acquired the now-CBS Sports Network in 2006, which has since televised college football from the Mid American Conference, Conference USA, Mountain West Conference and Northeast Conference, as well as home football games from Army, Navy, and UConn.

== History ==
From 1946 through 1949, WCBS-TV aired Columbia Lions football home games locally. CBS began broadcasting games nationally in 1950, with Red Barber as the play-by-play commentator.

=== 1950s ===
CBS aired a weekly game during the 1950 college football season, culminating in a broadcast of the Army–Navy Game with Connie Desmond doing the play-by-play. Desmond served as play-by-play commentator for CBS's 4 broadcasts in 1951, including the first ever color telecast when #5 California played #19 Penn. However the NCAA began strictly limiting broadcasts that season and CBS would not show regular season games again until 1955.

In 1953, CBS began covering the Orange Bowl annually, broadcasting the bowl annually until losing rights to ABC in 1962. CBS would add annual coverage of the Gator Bowl in 1954, broadcasting the bowl through 1963.

In 1955, CBS regular season coverage returned. CBS used Joe Hasel, Bob Neal, Mal Stevens, Jack Drees, Francis Wallace, Tom Harmon, and Gil Stratton as commentators. Drees was usually paired on commentary with Wallace on Midwest games, while Hasel and subsequently, Neal was paired with Stevens on Eastern regional games, and Harmon was paired with Stratton in games taking place on the West Coast. CBS would lose regular season rights to NBC the next year.

In 1958, CBS began annual coverage of the Cotton Bowl Classic, a tradition that would continue through 1992.

=== 1960s ===
By 1960, CBS showed four bowl games annually with the addition of the Bluebonnet Bowl, which would air on CBS through 1963.

In 1962 and 1963, regular season coverage returned to CBS. Lindsey Nelson, Jim Simpson and former Notre Dame head coach Terry Brennan were the lead broadcasters. In November 1963, CBS broadcast the first Harvard-Yale game a week after the assassination of Harvard alum John F. Kennedy.

In 1966, ABC Sports gained exclusive rights to all regular season games and CBS was reduced to coverage of bowl games. The ABC exclusive contract would run through 1981.

CBS added the Sun Bowl in 1968, which continues to air on CBS as of 2024 in the longest-running contract with a single bowl and network.

=== 1970s ===
From 1974 to 1977, CBS also aired the Fiesta Bowl, and from 1978 to 1986 it carried the Peach Bowl.

=== 1980s ===
For the 1982 season, CBS was made an additional partner in the NCAA contract, and regular season coverage returned to the network. CBS and ABC would alternate the 12:00 and 3:30 p.m. slots from week to week during the seasons, carrying either a national game or several regional games in those frames, and also occasionally aired games in prime time, and on Black Friday. CBS broadcast games from every major conference, as well as the games of the then major independents such as Penn State (now a Big Ten member), Notre Dame (a temporary Atlantic Coast Conference (ACC) member in 2020 only) and Miami (now in the ACC).

Per the September 1, 1982, edition of the Elyria (OH) Chronicle Telegram and the September 1, 1982, edition of Sports Illustrated, ABC and CBS officials met with NCAA representatives and flipped a coin to determine "control dates". This allowed the network with priority on a particular date to have first choice when selecting the game it wished to air and whether it wanted the 12:00 ET or 3:30 ET timeslot. CBS won the first toss and thus earned first choice on seven dates: September 18, September 25, October 2, October 9, October 16, November 6, and November 20. ABC then got first pick on six dates, September 11, October 23, October 30, November 13, November 27, and December 4. ABC and CBS also had the right to take away a game from WTBS as long as it did so no later than the Monday before the game. WTBS was only able to show teams that had not been on national TV in 1981 and a maximum of four teams that had been on regional TV on two occasions.

As required by the NCAA, the network also televised Division I-AA, II and III games to very small audiences, giving teams such as The Citadel and Clarion State some television exposure (during the 1982 season, because of a player strike in the National Football League, these Division III contests aired nationwide). The pregame show was titled The NCAA Today in the vein of its pro football counterpart The NFL Today. Both shows were hosted by Brent Musburger. However, for the NCAA pregame show, Pat O'Brien and Ara Parseghian were the analysts/feature reporters, although Lesley Visser made occasional appearances on the show. Gary Bender was the lead play-by-play announcer for game coverage, working with analysts such as Pat Haden and Steve Davis. Other CBS game commentators were Verne Lundquist, Lindsey Nelson, Frank Herzog, Jack Snow and Dennis Franklin. This arrangement was in place during the 1982 and 1983 seasons.

Also during the 1982 NFL strike, CBS' NCAA football contract required the network to show four Division III games; the network initially intended to show those games on Saturday afternoons, with the broadcasts being received only in markets that were interested in carrying them. However, with no NFL games to show on October 3, 1982 (on what would have been Week 5 of the NFL season) due to the strike, CBS decided to show all of its NCAA Division III games on a single Sunday afternoon in front of a mass audience. CBS also used their regular NFL crews (Pat Summerall and John Madden at Wittenberg–Baldwin–Wallace, Tom Brookshier and Wayne Walker at West Georgia–Millsaps, Tim Ryan and Johnny Morris at Wisconsin–Oshkosh – Wisconsin–Stout, and Dick Stockton and Roger Staubach at San Diego–Occidental) and aired The NFL Today instead of using their regular college football broadcasters.

CBS originally wanted to air some Division I-A games on Sunday. However, according to Sports Illustrated, fellow NCAA football rights holders ABC and WTBS refused to sign off on the idea. Both networks demanded that CBS pay more in rights fees if it showed additional games. WTBS also objected to CBS moving games from Saturday to Sunday due to fears that such games would steal viewers from the NFLPA All-Star Games that WTBS planned to air. When the red tape made showing big time college football too difficult to pull off, CBS got the idea to run Division III games on that Sunday. It doesn't appear that CBS had plans to air any more games, however, since, Division III or not, it would have likely meant having to kick more money to the NCAA per ABC's and WTBS' demands.

In 1984, on Thanksgiving weekend, CBS broadcast the famous Hail Flutie game.

In 1984, after the U.S. Supreme Court invalidated the NCAA contract in NCAA v. Board of Regents of the University of Oklahoma, and the University of Georgia, the College Football Association was formed to handle affairs between television networks and college football programs, the result was an exclusive contract with ABC that granted the network rights to all CFA partner conference games and the games of most major independents. However, the Big Ten and Pac-10 conferences were not included in this package, and signed their own agreement with CBS. Miami also reached an agreement for CBS to televise its most important home games, and in 1985, the Atlantic Coast Conference was added to CBS' list of college football properties. In 1985, Musburger took over the role of lead play-by-play voice, with Parseghian moving to the booth with him. Jim Nantz succeeded Musburger as studio host.

In 1987, CBS took over the CFA contract, which it would hold until 1990. CBS' tendency during this period was to air one marquee game each week, such as the legendary 1988 "Catholics vs Convicts" matchup between Notre Dame and Miami, though regional telecasts would occasionally be aired. For 1987 and 1988, Pat Haden joined Musburger in the booth, with John Dockery manning the sidelines. Nantz hosted what was now known as the "Prudential College Football Report", which was mostly a roundup of the day's scores and top headlines (including those in other sports), though sometimes key figures in the sport would be interviewed. Verne Lundquist, Tim Brant, Dick Stockton, Steve Zabriskie and Brad Nessler also called games for CBS during the CFA period. In 1989, Nantz became lead play-by-play announcer, but Haden remained the lead analyst for that year, being replaced by Brant in 1990.

=== 1990s ===
After 1990, ABC obtained exclusive network coverage of regular season college football, as it won back the CFA and retained the Pac-10/Big Ten rights.

As the 1990s began, CBS' Division I-A college football coverage was reduced to its bowl game contracts, which it had with the then-John Hancock (reverted to Sun Bowl in 1994), Cotton and the then-Blockbuster bowls. However, it lost the rights to the Cotton Bowl to NBC after the 1992 game, leaving the network with just two bowl games to round out its college football coverage. CBS televised Major League Baseball from 1990 to 1993, so as a result the network was not without major sports coverage on Saturdays during the fall after the loss of college football. In 1994 and 1995, after losing the MLB contract and its NFL contract, trying but failing to buy NHL rights, and still unable to secure a college football contract, CBS did not have any major sports coverage in the fall. (In desperation, the network began talks with the Canadian Football League, but nothing came of them.)

For 1995, CBS re-acquired the rights to the Cotton Bowl Classic and also gained rights to the Fiesta Bowl and the Orange Bowl from NBC. This was an important move for CBS as those two bowls would become part of the Bowl Alliance with the Sugar Bowl beginning that season; the goal was to try to guarantee an undisputed national champion in college football, something its predecessor the Bowl Coalition had also tried but did not fully succeed in doing.

Under the terms of the contract, which ran from 1995 through 1997, the Bowl Alliance games would be scheduled for New Year's Eve, New Year's Night, and January 2 with the last of the three serving as the national championship game. CBS would thus be guaranteed two national championship game matchups, with the Sugar Bowl airing on ABC.

CBS was the first network to air a Bowl Alliance national championship game, as Nebraska defeated Florida in the 1996 Fiesta Bowl (on the same token, CBS also aired the last Bowl Alliance national championship game, where Nebraska defeated Tennessee in the 1998 Orange Bowl to split that year's national championship vote as Michigan, which was No. 1 in both the AP and Coaches Polls going into the bowls, was obligated to play in that year's Rose Bowl). CBS also continued to air the Sun Bowl, but lost the rights to the Carquest Bowl after the game was moved from New Year's Day following the Orange Bowl's move to the home of the Carquest Bowl, Joe Robbie Stadium.

CBS resumed full-time college football coverage in 1996, as the network signed television contracts with the Big East Conference and Southeastern Conference (SEC) to be the exclusive national television home of their in-conference schedules. The coverage was originally branded "College Football on CBS", sponsored initially by NASDAQ, a tag it retains for non-SEC games broadcast on the network.

CBS also televised games featuring non-Big East or SEC teams during this time. As part of the contract signed in 1996, CBS succeeded ABC Sports as the television home of the Army–Navy Game.

On September 26, 1998, CBS planned to show UCLA @ Miami at noon, but this game was postponed due to Hurricane Georges. Sean McDonough and Terry Donahue were the scheduled announcer; the game was rescheduled to the end of the regular season.

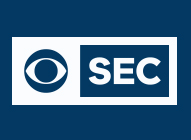
SEC on CBS logo used from 2016 to 2020.

CBS lost the rights to three of its bowl games following the 1997 season, as ABC gained the rights to the Orange and Fiesta Bowls as the exclusive television home of the newly formed Bowl Championship Series and Fox acquired the rights to the Cotton Bowl Classic.

=== 2000s ===
Beginning in 2001, CBS became the home of the SEC Championship Game, the rights to which had been retained by ABC following the SEC's move. Following the 2000 season, the Big East decided not to renew its contract with CBS and instead signed with ABC, leading to the telecasts taking on the SEC on CBS branding.

Until 2023, CBS aired the top SEC weekly in-conference games as well as rivalry games with various other conferences when the SEC team is the home team. The network shared the rights to SEC conference games with the ESPN family of networks, which also airs the interconference rivalry games when the SEC team is not the home team (with the exception of Notre Dame), as well as all Pac-12/SEC regular season games.

In 2000, CBS installed Verne Lundquist on its No. 1 team following Sean McDonough's departure from CBS Sports.

The events of September 11, 2001, resulted in postponements for games scheduled the weekend of September 15. The Tennessee-Florida game was rescheduled to December 1, which pushed the SEC title game one week later to December 8.

In 2005, CBS Sports Network, then operating as College Sports Television, signed a multi-year agreement to air select Conference USA football games. CBS Sports Network has aired the Conference USA Football Championship Game since 2018.

CBS aired the Gator Bowl from 2007 to 2010, its biggest bowl acquisition since the Orange and Fiesta Bowls.

=== 2010s ===
Until 2014, CBS maintained SEC exclusivity during its 3:30 p.m. Eastern Time window. As part of an extension to CBS's contract with the SEC through the 2023–24 season, CBS no longer has exclusivity during its afternoon window, but still has the first choice of games. CBS was limited to airing five games featuring a particular team per season, and was allowed to air one game in primetime per season. In 2014, the Iron Bowl was given to ESPN in favor of the Egg Bowl, due to its potential effects on Mississippi State's participation in the College Football Playoff).

Before 2019, CBS had rights to three non-SEC regular season matchups, including the Army-Navy Game. CBS and NBC Sports split coverage of the annual matchup between Notre Dame and Navy, with CBS televising the game in years where Navy served as the host team. CBS also added the Mountain West championship game to its coverage per a pre-existing contract that the network has with the conference (although most of the games air on CBS Sports Network); the game began in the last hour of primetime for the Eastern and Central time zones, meaning stations in those zones in most cases would not carry a late local newscast that evening. The Mountain West Championship Game was moved to ESPN networks beginning in 2015.

In 2011, in addition to Army–Navy, CBS also broadcast the other two service academy games: Navy–Air Force on October 1 and Army–Air Force on November 5, 2011 (a game which opened up as a result of CBS using its 8:00 p.m. game assignment for LSU-Alabama). Air Force's annual games vs. Army and Navy continue to air on CBS or CBS Sports Network.

In 2015, CBS Sports acquired the rights to 12 MAC football games through a sublicensing agreement with ESPN. In 2019, CBS Sports extended its contract with the MAC for four more years.

Verne Lundquist retired from his role as lead play-by-play commentator for CBS after the 2016 Army-Navy Game. Brad Nessler, formerly of ESPN, joined CBS as a secondary play-by-play announcer during the 2016 season, and officially replaced Lundquist on December 30, 2016, for CBS's coverage of the 2016 Sun Bowl.

=== 2020s ===
On December 20, 2019, it was reported by Sports Business Journal that after having offered $300 million per-season, CBS had exited negotiations to renew its SEC package beyond the 2023 season. CBS cited a need to "aggressively focus on other important strategic priorities moving forward". On December 10, 2020, ESPN announced that it had acquired the top SEC rights under a 10-year deal beginning in 2024, valued at $3 billion over the length of the contract. The games are slated to air on ABC, thus centralizing the entirety of the SEC's media rights with The Walt Disney Company.

On May 11, 2020, CBS Sports agreed to a multi-year deal through the 2023 season to become the home of UConn Huskies home games, which will mostly air on CBS Sports Network.

After the 2020 season, CBS lost its alternating rights to the Navy–Notre Dame game to ESPN. The rights were bought as part of a new media rights contract signed between the network and the American Athletic Conference (AAC), which Navy has affiliated with for football since 2015.

On August 18, 2022, CBS reached a seven-year deal to broadcast Big Ten football and basketball beginning in the 2023 season. CBS will air up to 15 Big Ten football games per-season, including a Friday afternoon game on Thanksgiving weekend, and the Big Ten Football Championship Game in 2024 and 2028. Big Ten games replaced the SEC in CBS's traditional 3:30 p.m. ET window beginning in the 2024 season; in a transitional arrangement, CBS carried seven Big Ten games in 2023 around its final season of SEC coverage, which were mostly part of doubleheaders and tripleheaders with SEC and/or Mountain West games.

In 2023, CBS Sports Network began airing football games from the FCS level Northeast Conference.

In 2024, CBS renewed its rights to the Sun Bowl through 2030.

In April 2025, the Pac-12 Conference—whose membership had been reduced to Oregon State and Washington State after the rest of its teams departed to the Big Ten, Big 12, and ACC in 2024—announced an agreement to air two prime time games on CBS in the 2025 season (with the remainder airing on The CW, and two on ESPN); this included the Apple Cup game between Washington State and its Big Ten rival Washington. In June 2025, ahead of the conference's reconstruction to include at least six additional teams in the 2026 season (most of which coming from the Mountain West), the Pac-12 announced an extension of the contract through the 2030 season. CBS will air at least three regular season games per-season and the Pac-12 Football Championship Game, while CBS Sports Network will also air a package of games. Beginning with the 2026 season CBS will introduce a new graphics design similar to the NFL on CBS.

== Theme music ==
The instrumental theme music for CBS's college football broadcasts was written by New York composer Lloyd Landesman, and has been used since the 1987 season. The theme music was originally used for CBS's broadcast of Super Bowl XXI on January 25, 1987, but it was later decided that the piece was better suited for college football than the National Football League (NFL). After CBS acquired the rights to air SEC games in 1996, the theme music became synonymous with that conference. In August 2022, news of CBS's intention to continue using the theme music for its Big Ten games spawned outbursts from upset SEC fans on Twitter.

== Typical games ==
Typically only Big Ten on CBS games, select Mountain West games, games involving the Commander-in-Chief's Trophy (Army-Navy, Army-Air Force, and Air Force-Navy) and the Sun Bowl air on CBS, with all other games airing on CBS Sports Network. Under the Big Ten contract, CBS holds rights to 15 games per-season, with 14 on Saturdays (usually in a 3:30 p.m. ET window) and one on the Friday after Thanksgiving. The first pick of games between its three broadcast rightsholders (Fox, CBS, and NBC) is determined via draft selections of specific dates and other factors. CBS will air the Big Ten Championship Game in 2024 and 2028.

CBS Sports Network airs weekly games from the Mid-American Conference, C-USA and Mountain West, as well as all UConn home games and select Army and Navy home games. CBSSN also airs the Conference USA Football Championship Game and the Hula Bowl yearly.

=== Former SEC coverage ===
The games aired as part of the SEC package were the premiere SEC matchups of the week. From 1996 to 2023, Alabama had the most appearances with 128 of their games broadcast by CBS, followed by Florida with 110, Georgia with 95, LSU with 82, and Tennessee with 77. The ESPN family of networks had the subsequent picks of games among the SEC's national television partners. From 2001 to 2023, the SEC Championship Game was televised by CBS. The Vanderbilt Commodores appeared on the CBS package only seven times, with a 2013 game against Georgia (a 31–27 victory) marking their first appearance since 2001, and the first Vanderbilt home game televised by the network since 1982. Before their remarkable 2014 season, when they appeared four times (including the first Egg Bowl ever broadcast by CBS), Mississippi State had only seven CBS games as part of the package.

Traditional rivalries that were often aired by CBS included Florida–Tennessee (1996–2011, 2013, 2015–2017, 2020, and 2022), Florida–Georgia (all but 2002), Auburn–Alabama (the Iron Bowl) (since 2000, except for 2003, 2007 and 2014), LSU–Alabama (except for 2021 and 2022), Florida–LSU (1999, 2001, 2003, 2005–2009, 2011–2013, and 2017–2018), LSU–Ole Miss (2003, 2007–2010, 2012, 2015, and 2021) and LSU–Arkansas (1996–2013, except 2009), which was traditionally aired the day after Thanksgiving.

== Team records ==
1996 through October 31, 2026 – does not include bowl games

Team	Appearances	Wins	Losses	Win Pct.
Alabama	128	90	38	.703
Florida	110	72	38	.655
Georgia	95	59	36	.621
LSU	82	45	37	.549
Tennessee	77	32	45	.416
Auburn	61	26	35	.426
Arkansas	47	14	33	.298
Navy	45	23	22	.511
Army	31	11	20	.355
Ole Miss	27	8	19	.296
South Carolina	24	5	19	.208
Texas A&M	24	9	15	.375
Miami (FL)	21	13	8	.619
Notre Dame	21	18	3	.857
Kentucky	17	1	16	.059
West Virginia	15	5	10	.333
Mississippi State	15	6	9	.400
Air Force	15	8	7	.533
Missouri	14	7	7	.500
Penn State	14	10	4	.714
Boston College	13	0	13	.000
Syracuse	11	8	3	.727
Florida State	11	5	6	.455
Oregon	10	8	2	.800
Virginia Tech	9	6	3	.667
USC	9	5	4	.556
Iowa	9	4	5	.444
Michigan	9	5	4	.556
Georgia Tech	8	4	4	.500
Pittsburgh	8	4	3 ^{1}	.571
Ohio State	8	8	0	1.000
Vanderbilt	7	1	6	.143
UCLA	7	6	1	.857
Boise State	6	4	2	.667
Indiana	6	4	2	.667
Minnesota	5	1	4	.200
San Diego State	4	1	3	.250
Utah State	4	0	4	.000
Rutgers	4	1	3	.250
Illinois	3	1	2	.333
Purdue	3	0	3	.000
Wisconsin	3	0	3	.000
Nebraska	3	0	3	.000
Washington	3	1	2	.333
Oregon State	3	2	1	.667
Washington State	3	0	3	.000
Louisville	2	1	1	.500
Fresno State	2	1	1	.500
Colorado	2	1	1	.500
San Jose State	2	1	1	.500
Nevada	2	1	1	.500
Hawaii	2	1	1	.500
Stanford	2	0	2	.000
Texas Tech	2	1	1	.500
Colorado State	2	0	2	.000
Arizona	2	2	0	1.000
Michigan State	2	0	2	.000
Arizona State	1	1	0	1.000
Memphis	1	1	0	1.000
TCU	1	1	0	1.000
Virginia	1	0	1	.000
Appalachian State	1	0	1	.000
Marshall	1	1	0	1.000
Wyoming	1	1	0	1.000
Northwestern	1	0	1	.000
UNLV	1	0	1	.000
Akron	1	0	1	.000
Iowa State	1	1	0	1.000
Oklahoma State	1	0	1	.000
Maryland	1	0	1	.000
BYU	1	1	0	1.000

== Notable personalities ==
=== Current ===
==== Play-by-play ====
- Brad Nessler: lead play-by-play (2016–present)
- Rich Waltz: #2 play-by-play (2014–present); lead Mountain West Conference play-by-play
- Chris Lewis: play-by-play (2021–present)
- Jack Gordon: play-by-play (2025–present)
- Jason Knapp: play-by-play (2019–present)
- Justin Kutcher: play-by-play (2026–present)
- John Sadak: lead Navy play-by-play (2014–present)
- Alex Del Barrio: play-by-play (2020–present)
- Carter Blackburn: fill-in play-by-play (2014–2020, 2022–present)
- Jordan Kent: Lead UConn play by play (2024–present)

==== Color analysts ====
- Charles Davis: lead color analyst (2026–present)
- Adam Breneman: #2 color analyst (2023–present)
- Randy Cross: lead Navy color analyst (2009–present)
- Ben DiNucci: color analyst (2025–present)
- Robert Turbin: color analyst (2022–present)
- Emory Hunt: color analyst (2026–present)
- Taylor McHargue: color analyst (2023–present)
- Doug Pederson: color analyst (2026–present)
- Brian Kelly: color analyst (2026–present)

==== Sideline reporters ====
- Jenny Dell: (2015–present)
- Tina Cervasio: Army sideline reporter (2016–present)
- Brandon Baylor: (2021–present)
- Tiffany Blackmon: (2023–present)
- Jordan Giorgio (2025-present)
- Hailey Sutton (2025-present)
- Lauren Green (2025)
- Brandon Marcello (2025-present)
- Richard Johnson (2025-present)
- Jacelyn DeAugustino (2026-present)

==== Studio ====
- Adam Zucker: CBS host (2011–present)
- Brent Stover: CBSSN host (2011–present)
- Brian Jones: CBS analyst (2013–present)
- Rick Neuheisel: CBS analyst (2015–present)
- Aaron Taylor: CBS analyst (2024–present)
- Kevin Carter: CBSSN analyst (2018–present)
- Brian Kelly: CBSSN analyst (2026–present)
- Cardale Jones: CBSSN analyst (2023–present)
- Beanie Wells: CBSSN analyst (2023–present)
- Gene Steratore: rules analyst (2019–present)

=== Former ===
==== Play-by-play ====
- Gary Bender (1982–1983; 1984–1986)
- Craig Bolerjack (1999–2010)
- Tim Brando (1997; 2011–2013)
- Don Criqui (2008)
- Dick Enberg (2001)
- Frank Herzog (1982–83)
- Gus Johnson (1996–1997)
- Verne Lundquist (1982–1988); lead play-by-play (2000–2016)
- Sean McDonough lead play-by-play (1990–1999)
- Brent Musburger (1984–1988)
- Jim Nantz (1989–1990; 1996)
- Lindsey Nelson (1962–63; 1982–83)
- Dave Ryan: play-by-play (2012–2025)
- Tim Ryan (1996)
- Noah Eagle: No. 2 play-by-play (2021)
- Jason Horowitz: lead Army play-by-play
- Chris Hassel: fill-in play-by-play (2017–2022)
- Meghan McPeak: lead UConn play-by-play (2022)
- Chick Hernandez: play-by-play (2021–2023)
- Ed Cohen: fill-in play-by-play (2013–2023)
- Tom McCarthy: play-by-play (2022–2024); #2 play-by-play (2022-2023)

==== Color commentary ====
- Trev Alberts (2008)
- Todd Blackledge: lead color analyst (1999–2005)
- Dean Blevins (2000–2001)
- Tim Brant
- Terry Brennan (1962–63)
- Steve Beuerlein (2006–2010; 2012)
- Ed Cunningham (1997–1999)
- Steve Davis (1982–1985; 1996 Cotton Bowl)
- Terry Donahue (1996–1998)
- Dan Fouts (2008)
- Dennis Franklin (1982–83)
- Pat Haden (1982–83; 1987–90)
- Craig James (2002)
- Dan Jiggetts
- Mike Mayock (1996–1999)
- Jack Snow (1982–1983)
- Ross Tucker: color analyst (2015–2025); lead Army color analyst
- Scott Hunter (1983)
- Dan Dierdorf (2001 Army-Navy Game)
- Boomer Esiason (multiple Army-Navy Games)
- Aaron Murray: co-No. 2 color analyst (2019–2021); No.2 Mountain West Conference color analyst (2021)
- Tom Herman: color analyst (2022)
- Rick Neuheisel: No. 2 color analyst (2017–2022)
- Jay Feely: color analyst (2017, 2024)
- Danny Kanell: CBSSN analyst (2018–2023)
- Gary Danielson: lead color analyst (1983; 2006–2025)
- Logan Ryan: color analyst (2024–2025)
- Aaron Taylor: color analyst (2008–2023)
- Donte Whitner: color analyst (2021–2024)
- Brock Vereen: color analyst (2023–2024)

==== Sideline reporters ====
- Jill Arrington (lead, 2000–2003)
- John Dockery
- Mike Joy (1990 & 1991 Sun Bowl)
- Sam Ryan
- Lewis Johnson (2011)
- Allie LaForce (lead, 2014–2017)
- Otis Livingston (2011)
- Tracy Wolfson (lead, 2004–2013)
- John Schriffen: (2017–2019)
- Jamie Erdahl: (2018–2021)
- Lindsay Rhodes: (2021)
- Sherree Burress: (2021–2022, Southeastern Conference games only)

==== Studio hosts ====
- Tim Brando (1998–2013)
- Greg Gumbel (1989)
- Andrea Joyce (1990)
- Brent Musburger (1982–1983)
- Jim Nantz (1985–1988; 1997)
- Pat O'Brien (1984; 1995–1996)

==== Studio analysts ====
- Spencer Tillman (1999–2014)
- Ara Parseghian (1982–1989)
- Mike Francesa (1990)
- Boomer Esiason (1995)
- Butch Davis (1995)
- Craig James (1996–1998)
- Lou Holtz (1997–1998)
- Archie Manning (2005–2013)
- Houston Nutt (2017–2022)

== Features ==
- State Farm College Football Today (main pre-game show aired at 2:30 pm. Eastern Time and simulcast on CBS Sports Network prior to their 3:30 p.m. college game)
- Starting Lineups presented by Chick-fil-A
- Ford Update (throughout the game)
- Nissan Heisman Watch (throughout the game)
- Geico Halftime Report (formerly sponsored by EarthLink until 2004)
- Preview of Sunday's NFL on CBS matchups
- First Half Trends Presented by Enterprise Rent-a-Car (at the start of second half)
- Aflac Trivia Question
- The Home Depot Tools for Success
- Geico Game Recap (formerly showed only scoring plays until 2008 as the "Scoring Recap")
- Quicken Loans Scholar Athlete (formerly sponsored by Red Lobster until 2016)
- NAPA Auto Parts Play of the Game (formerly named the "Wrangler 5-Star Play of the Game")
- U.S. Army Post-game Show (formerly sponsored by Jeep until 2016, Dodge until 2018, and by Rocket Mortgage until 2022)

== Nielsen ratings ==
=== Regular season ===
Rank	Date	Matchup				Network	Viewers (millions)	TV ratings	Significance
1	November 9, 2019, 3:30 ET	#2 LSU	46	#3 Alabama	41	CBS	16.64	9.7	Alabama-LSU football rivalry
2	November 25, 2017, 3:30 ET	#1 Alabama	14	#6 Auburn	26	CBS	13.66	7.6	Iron Bowl
3	November 5, 2022, 3:30 ET	#1 Tennessee	13	#3 Georgia	27	CBS	13.06	6.7	College GameDay, Rivalry
4	October 15, 2022, 3:30 ET	#3 Alabama	49	#6 Tennessee	52	CBS	11.56	6.1	Third Saturday in October
5	November 3, 2018, 8:00 ET	#1 Alabama	29	#3 LSU	0	CBS	11.54	6.6	Alabama-LSU football rivalry
6	November 30, 2019, 3:30 ET	#5 Alabama	45	#15 Auburn	48	CBS	11.43	6.3	Iron Bowl
7	November 7, 2015, 8:00 ET	#2 LSU	16	#4 Alabama	30	CBS	11.06	6.4	Alabama-LSU football rivalry
8	November 5, 2016, 8:00 ET	#1 Alabama	10	#13 LSU	0	CBS	10.38	5.8	Alabama-LSU football rivalry
9	November 27, 2021, 3:30 ET	#3 Alabama	24	Auburn	22	CBS	10.37	5.3	Iron Bowl
10	October 17, 2020, 8:00 ET	#3 Georgia	24	#2 Alabama	41	CBS	9.61	5.3	Alabama-Georgia football rivalry

=== Conference championships ===
Year	Conference	Matchup				Network	Viewers (millions)	TV ratings
2015	SEC	#18 Florida	15	#2 Alabama	29	CBS	12.8	7.8
2016	SEC	#1 Alabama	54	#18 Florida	16	CBS	11.09	6.6
2017	SEC	#6 Georgia	28	#2 Auburn	7	CBS	13.47	8.0
2018	SEC	#1 Alabama	35	#4 Georgia	28	CBS	17.5	10.1
2018	C-USA	UAB	27	Middle Tennessee	25	CBSSN	n.a	n.a
2019	SEC	#4 Georgia	10	#2 LSU	37	CBS	13.70	7.9
2019	C-USA	UAB	6	Florida Atlantic	49	CBSSN	n.a	n.a
2020	SEC	#1 Alabama	52	#7 Florida	46	CBS	8.92	4.9
2020	C-USA	UAB	22	Marshall	13	CBSSN	n.a	n.a
2021 (Spring)	Patriot League	Holy Cross	33	Bucknell	10	CBSSN	n.a	n.a
2021	SEC	#1 Georgia	24	#3 Alabama	41	CBS	15.27	8.2
2021	C-USA	WKU	41	UTSA	49	CBSSN	n.a	n.a
2022	SEC	#14 LSU	30	#1 Georgia	50	CBS	10.89	5.6
2022	C-USA	North Texas	27	UTSA	48	CBSSN	n.a	n.a
2023	SEC	#1 Georgia	24	#8 Alabama	27	CBS	17.52	8.9
2023	C-USA	New Mexico State	35	#24 Liberty	49	CBSSN	n.a	n.a
2024	Big Ten	#1 Oregon	45	#3 Penn State	37	CBS	10.5	5.2
2024	C-USA	Western Kentucky	12	Jacksonville State	52	CBSSN	n.a	n.a

=== Bowl games ===
Year	Bowl game	Matchup				Network	Viewers (millions)	TV ratings
2015	Sun Bowl	Miami	14	Washington State	20	CBS	4.7	2.9
2015	Cure Bowl	San Jose State	27	Georgia State	16	CBSSN	n.a	n.a
2016	Sun Bowl	#18 Stanford	25	North Carolina	23	CBS	3.0	1.7
2016	Cure Bowl	Arkansas State	31	UCF Knights	13	CBSSN	n.a	n.a
2017	Sun Bowl	#24 NC State	52	Arizona State	31	CBS	2.2	1.5
2017	Cure Bowl	Western Kentucky	17	Georgia State	27	CBSSN	n.a	n.a
2017	Arizona Bowl	New Mexico State	26	Utah State	20	CBSSN	n.a	n.a
2018	Sun Bowl	Stanford	14	Pitt	13	CBS	2.6	1.8
2018	Cure Bowl	Tulane	41	Louisiana	24	CBSSN	n.a	n.a
2018	Arizona Bowl	Arkansas State	13	Nevada	16	CBSSN	n.a	n.a
2019	Sun Bowl	Florida State	14	Arizona State	20	CBS	3.2	2.1
2019	Cure Bowl	Liberty	23	Georgia Southern	16	CBSSN	n.a	n.a
2019	Arizona Bowl	Wyoming	38	Georgia State	17	CBSSN	n.a	n.a
2020	Arizona Bowl	Ball State	34	#22 San Jose State	13	CBS	1.8	1.1
2020	Sun Bowl	Game canceled due to COVID-19 pandemic						
2021	Sun Bowl	Washington State	21	Central Michigan	24	CBS	2.9	1.8
2022	Sun Bowl	Pitt	37	#18 UCLA	35	CBS	2.8	1.5
2023	Sun Bowl	#19 Oregon State	8	#16 Notre Dame	40	CBS	3.2	1.8
2024	Sun Bowl	Louisville	35	Washington	34	CBS	n.a	n.a
2025	Sun Bowl	Arizona State	39	Duke	42	CBS	n.a	n.a
