= 2020 Fordham Rams football team =

American college football season

2020 Fordham Rams football
- Conference: Patriot League
- North Division
- Record: 2–1 (2–1 Patriot)
- Head coach: Joe Conlin (3rd season)
- Offensive coordinator: Kevin Decker (2nd season)
- Defensive coordinator: Jameson Zacharias (1st season)
- Home stadium: Coffey Field

2020 Patriot League football standings
	Conf.			Overall
Team	W		L	W		L
North Division
Holy Cross $^	2	–	0	3	–	1
Fordham	2	–	1	2	–	1
Colgate	0	–	2	0	–	2
South Division
Bucknell	2	–	1	2	–	2
Lafayette	2	–	1	2	–	1
Lehigh	0	–	3	0	–	3
Championship: Holy Cross 33, Bucknell 10
$ – Conference champion; ^ – FCS playoff participant; Notes: Due to COVID-19, the Patriot League suspended the fall 2020 football season. Georgetown opted out of the spring football season.; Rankings from STATS Poll

The 2020 Fordham Rams football team represented Fordham University as member of the North Division of Patriot League during the 2020–21 NCAA Division I FCS football season. Led by third-year head coach Joe Conlin, the Rams compiled an overall record of 2–1 with an identical mark in conference play, placing second the Patriot League's North Division. Fordham played home games at Coffey Field in The Bronx.

On July 13, 2020, the Patriot League announced that it would cancel its fall sports seasons due to the COVID-19 pandemic. The league announced a spring schedule on February 5, with the first games set to be played on March 13.

== Schedule ==
Fordham had games scheduled against Stony Brook on August 29, Bryant on September 5, and Hawaii on September 12, which were all later canceled before the start of the 2020 season.

Date	Time	Opponent	Site	TV	Result	Attendance
March 27	1:00 p.m.	at Holy Cross	Fitton Field; Worcester, MA (Ram–Crusader Cup)	ESPN+	L 24–34	
April 3	4:00 p.m.	Colgate	Coffey Field; Bronx, NY	ESPN+	W 40–8	
April 10	1:00 p.m.	at Bucknell	Christy Mathewson–Memorial Stadium; Lewisburg, PA	ESPN+	W 31–17	
Rankings from STATS Poll released prior to the game; All times are in Eastern time
