= 2020 Lafayette Leopards football team =

American college football season

2020 Lafayette Leopards football
- Conference: Patriot League
- North Division
- Record: 2–1 (2–1 Patriot)
- Head coach: John Garrett (4th season)
- Defensive coordinator: Doug McFadden (1st season)
- Home stadium: Fisher Field

2020 Patriot League football standings
	Conf.			Overall
Team	W		L	W		L
North Division
Holy Cross $^	2	–	0	3	–	1
Fordham	2	–	1	2	–	1
Colgate	0	–	2	0	–	2
South Division
Bucknell	2	–	1	2	–	2
Lafayette	2	–	1	2	–	1
Lehigh	0	–	3	0	–	3
Championship: Holy Cross 33, Bucknell 10
$ – Conference champion; ^ – FCS playoff participant; Notes: Due to COVID-19, the Patriot League suspended the fall 2020 football season. Georgetown opted out of the spring football season.; Rankings from STATS Poll

The 2020 Lafayette Leopards football team represented Lafayette College in the 2020–21 NCAA Division I FCS football season. The team was led by fourth-year head coach John Garrett and played its home games at Fisher Field as a member of the Patriot League.

On July 13, 2020, the Patriot League announced that it would cancel its fall sports seasons due to the COVID-19 pandemic. The league announced a spring schedule on February 5, with the first games set to be played on March 13.

== Schedule ==
Lafayette had games scheduled against Sacred Heart (September 5), Navy (September 12), Penn (September 26), and Harvard (October 17), which were all later canceled before the start of the 2020 season.

Date	Time	Opponent	Site	TV	Result	Attendance
March 13	3:30 p.m.	Colgate	Fisher Stadium; Easton, PA	ESPN+	W 24–10	
March 27	4:00 p.m.	at Bucknell	Christy Mathewson–Memorial Stadium; Lewisburg, PA	ESPN+	L 13–38	
April 10	12:30 p.m.	Lehigh	Fisher Stadium; Easton, PA (The Rivalry)	ESPN+	W 20–13	
Rankings from STATS Poll released prior to the game; All times are in Eastern time
