= Dan Hunt (American football) =

American football coach

Current position
- Title: Offensive coordinator
- Team: Lehigh
- Conference: Patriot

Biographical details
- Born: Canajoharie, New York, U.S.

Playing career
- 1988–1991: Springfield
- Position: Tight end

Coaching career (HC unless noted)
- 1992: Springfield (JV)
- 1993–1994: Springfield (WR/TE)
- 1995−1996: Colgate (TE)
- 1997: Colgate (RB)
- 1998−2005: Colgate (QB)
- 2006–2013: Colgate (OC/QB)
- 2014–2020: Colgate
- 2021: Williams (RB/TE)
- 2022: Franklin & Marshall (OC/QB)
- 2023–present: Lehigh (OC/QB)

Head coaching record
- Overall: 40–33
- Tournaments: 3–2 (NCAA D-I playoffs)

Accomplishments and honors

Championships
- 3 Patriot (2015, 2017–2018)

Daniel L. Hunt is an American football coach and former player. He is the offensive coordinator at Lehigh University, a position he had held since 2023. Hunt served as the head football coach at Colgate University from 2014 through his resignation in May 2021. Hunt played for Springfield College from 1988 to 1991 and was a two-year starter at tight end. Hunt graduated from Springfield in 1992 with a degree in physical education, and earned his master's degree in athletic administration from Springfield in 1995. He began his coaching career as an assistant at Springfield before coming to Colgate in 1995. He has coached tight ends, running backs, and quarterbacks during his tenure and he was named associate head coach in 2010. Hunt was named as the 29th head coach at Colgate upon the retirement of Dick Biddle following the 2013 season.

== Head coaching record ==
Year	Team	Overall	Conference	Standing	Bowl/playoffs	STATS^{#}	Coaches^{°}
Colgate Raiders (Patriot League) (2014–2020)
2014	Colgate	5–7	3–3	T–3rd			
2015	Colgate	9–5	6–0	1st	L NCAA Division I Quarterfinal	17	13
2016	Colgate	5–5	4–2	3rd			
2017	Colgate	7–4	5–1	T–1st			
2018	Colgate	10–2	6–0	1st	L NCAA Division I Quarterfinal	8	7
2019	Colgate	4–8	3–3	T–3rd			
2020–21	Colgate	0–2	0–2	3rd (North)			
Colgate:		40–33	27–11				
Total:		40–33					
National championship Conference title Conference division title or championship game berth
^{#}Rankings from final STATS Poll.; ^{°}Rankings from final FCS Coaches Poll.
