= 2020 Colgate Raiders football team =

Colgate University in the 2020 NCAA Division I FCS football season

2020 Colgate Raiders football
- Conference: Patriot League
- North Division
- Record: 0–2 (0–2 Patriot)
- Head coach: Dan Hunt (7th season)
- Co-offensive coordinators: Brent Bassham (1st season); Terry Dow (1st season)
- Defensive coordinator: Paul Shaffner (8th season)
- Home stadium: Crown Field at Andy Kerr Stadium

2020 Patriot League football standings
	Conf.			Overall
Team	W		L	W		L
North Division
Holy Cross $^	2	–	0	3	–	1
Fordham	2	–	1	2	–	1
Colgate	0	–	2	0	–	2
South Division
Bucknell	2	–	1	2	–	2
Lafayette	2	–	1	2	–	1
Lehigh	0	–	3	0	–	3
Championship: Holy Cross 33, Bucknell 10
$ – Conference champion; ^ – FCS playoff participant; Notes: Due to COVID-19, the Patriot League suspended the fall 2020 football season. Georgetown opted out of the spring football season.; Rankings from STATS Poll

The 2020 Colgate Raiders football team represented Colgate University in the 2020–21 NCAA Division I FCS football season. They were led by seventh-year head coach Dan Hunt and played their home games at Crown Field at Andy Kerr Stadium. They were a member of the Patriot League.

On July 13, 2020, the Patriot League announced that it would cancel its fall sports seasons due to the COVID-19 pandemic. The league announced a spring schedule on February 5, with the first games set to be played on March 13.

== Schedule ==
Colgate had games scheduled against Western Michigan on September 4, and Cornell on October 17, which were later canceled before the start of the 2020 season.

Date	Time	Opponent	Site	TV	Result	Attendance
March 13	3:30 p.m.	at Lafayette	Fisher Stadium; Easton, PA	ESPN+	L 10–24	
April 3	4:00 p.m.	at Fordham	Coffey Field; The Bronx, NY	ESPN+	L 8–40	
April 10	5:00 p.m.	Holy Cross	Crown Field at Andy Kerr Stadium; Hamilton, NY	ESPN+	Canceled	
Rankings from STATS Poll released prior to the game; All times are in Eastern time
