= 2020 Lehigh Mountain Hawks football team =

American college football season

2020 Lehigh Mountain Hawks football
- Conference: Patriot League
- North Division
- Record: 0–3 (0–3 Patriot)
- Head coach: Tom Gilmore (2nd season)
- Offensive coordinator: Scott Brisson (4th season)
- Defensive coordinator: Mike Kashurba (2nd season)
- Home stadium: Goodman Stadium

Uniform
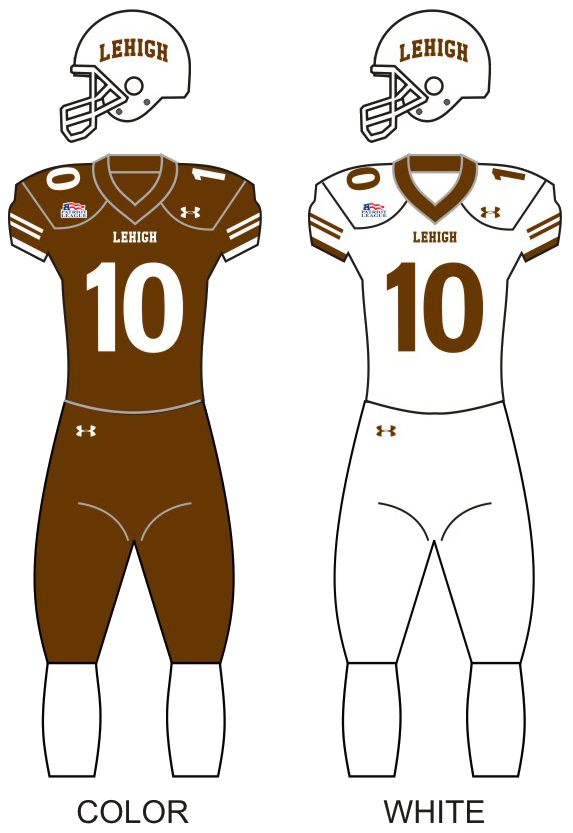

2020 Patriot League football standings
	Conf.			Overall
Team	W		L	W		L
North Division
Holy Cross $^	2	–	0	3	–	1
Fordham	2	–	1	2	–	1
Colgate	0	–	2	0	–	2
South Division
Bucknell	2	–	1	2	–	2
Lafayette	2	–	1	2	–	1
Lehigh	0	–	3	0	–	3
Championship: Holy Cross 33, Bucknell 10
$ – Conference champion; ^ – FCS playoff participant; Notes: Due to COVID-19, the Patriot League suspended the fall 2020 football season. Georgetown opted out of the spring football season.; Rankings from STATS Poll

The 2020 Lehigh Mountain Hawks football team represented Lehigh University in the 2020–21 NCAA Division I FCS football season. The Mountain Hawks were led by second-year head coach Tom Gilmore and played their home games at Goodman Stadium. They competed as a member of the Patriot League.

On July 13, 2020, the Patriot League announced that it would cancel its fall sports seasons due to the COVID-19 pandemic. The league announced a spring schedule on February 5, with the first games set to be played on March 13.

== Schedule ==
Lehigh had games scheduled against Columbia, on September 19 and Yale, on October 3, which were later canceled before the start of the 2020 season.

Date	Time	Opponent	Site	TV	Result	Attendance
March 13	12:00 p.m.	Holy Cross	Goodman Stadium; Bethlehem, PA	ESPN+	L 3–20	
April 3	12:00 p.m.	Bucknell	Goodman Stadium; Bethlehem, PA	ESPN+	L 0–6	
April 10	12:30 p.m.	at Lafayette	Fisher Stadium; Easton, PA (The Rivalry)	ESPN+	L 13–20	
Rankings from STATS Poll released prior to the game; All times are in Eastern time
