= Kevin Decker =

American football coach (born 1988)

Current position
- Title: Offensive coordinator
- Team: Memphis
- Conference: American

Biographical details
- Born: August 22, 1988 (age 38); Armonk, New York, U.S.

Playing career
- 2007–2011: New Hampshire
- Position: Quarterback

Coaching career (HC unless noted)
- 2013–2014: Brunswick School (CT) (OC/QB)
- 2015: Montana State (OA)
- 2016–2017: Brown (TE)
- 2018: Brown (OC/TE)
- 2019–2022: Fordham (OC/QB)
- 2023–2025: Old Dominion (OC/QB)
- 2026–present: Memphis (OC)

Kevin Decker (born August 22, 1988) is an American college football coach and former player. He is the offensive coordinator for the Memphis Tigers football team.

== Playing career ==
Decker grew up in Armonk, New York and attended the Brunswick School in Greenwich, Connecticut. He went 34-1 in three years as Brunswick's starting quarterback and won three consecutive New England Class C titles. Decker finished his high school career with 5,763 passing yards and 75 touchdown passes.

Decker played college football at the University of New Hampshire. Decker redshirted his true freshman season and was a backup quarterback for his next three seasons for the Wildcats. He was named the starting quarterback going into his redshirt senior season. In his only season as a starter, Decker passed for 3,272 yards and 22 touchdowns while also rushing for 429 yards and nine touchdowns and was named the Colonial Athletic Association Offensive Player of the Year.

== Coaching career ==
Decker began his coaching career at the Brunswick School, where he served as the school's quarterbacks coach and offensive coordinator for two years. He was hired as an assistant to his former New Hampshire offensive coordinator Tim Cramsey at Montana State in 2015 for his collegiate coaching position. Decker was hired by Brown as a tight ends coach after one season at Montana State and was promoted to offensive coordinator in 2018.

Decker was then hired by Fordham head coach Joe Conlin to serve as the Rams' quarterbacks coach and offensive coordinator in 2019. After the 2020 FCS season was postponed to the spring of 2021 due to the Covid-19 pandemic, Decker studied then-Central Florida head coach Josh Heupel's offense and began installing it leading into the Rams' 2021 season. During the 2022 season, Fordham's offensive became the second team in FCS history to average over 600 yards of total offense per game.

Decker was hired as the offensive coordinator at Old Dominion University (ODU) on December 5, 2022. He installed the high-tempo spread offense he had used at Fordham. In his first season, the Monarchs scored nearly 100 more points than the previous year, ranked eighth in the Sun Belt Conference in rushing offense and tied for the national lead with 12 touchdown drives lasting one minute or less. The offense improved again in 2024, leading the Sun Belt in rushing and the nation in red-zone efficiency at 95 percent, while its 2,517 rushing yards were the second most in program history. During the 2025 season, Old Dominion averaged 460.8 yards and 32.7 points per game, ranking 15th and 29th nationally, respectively, and finished 10–3 after defeating South Florida in the Cure Bowl. Decker also coached quarterback Colton Joseph, who was named the Sun Belt Offensive Player of the Year after accounting for 3,631 total yards and 34 touchdowns.

After three seasons at Old Dominion, Decker was hired by Memphis as the Tigers’ offensive coordinator and quarterbacks coach.
