= Carl F. Ullrich =

American rowing coach and athletics administrator

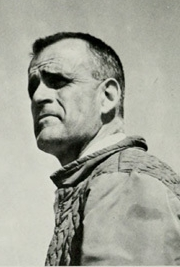
- Ullrich from 1971 Lucky Bag

Biographical details
- Born: June 23, 1928; Ridgewood, New Jersey, U.S.
- Died: May 9, 2023 (aged 94); Virginia Beach, Virginia, U.S.
- Education: Cornell University

Playing career
- 1947–1950: Cornell (lightweight)
- Position: Bow

Coaching career (HC unless noted)
- 1955–1959: Cornell (freshmen)
- 1960–1965: Columbia
- 1967: Boston University
- 1968–1974: Navy

Administrative career (AD unless noted)
- 1975–1978: Navy (assistant AD)
- 1979: Western Michigan
- 1980–1990: Army
- 1989–1993: Patriot League (ex. dir.)
- 1995–1997: St. Andrews Presbyterian
- 2002–2004: St. Andrews Presbyterian

Accomplishments and honors

Championships
- Eastern Sprints (1971)

Awards
- Army Sports Hall of Fame (2007)

Carl Farnum Ullrich (June 23, 1928 – May 9, 2023) was a former American college rowing coach and athletics administrator who served as the first civilian athletic director at the United States Military Academy, from 1980 to 1990.

== Early life and education ==
Ullrich was born in Ridgewood, New Jersey, in 1928 and grew up on Long Island, New York. He attended Cornell University, where he received a Bachelor of Mechanical Engineering degree in 1950. While at Cornell, he joined Sigma Chi fraternity and was a member of the 1949 national champion lightweight crew, serving as captain in 1950. He also was a member of the Quill and Dagger society. After graduation he was commissioned as a 2nd Lieutenant in the United States Marine Corps, and served as an infantry officer during the Korean War.

== Coaching career ==
Ullrich returned to Cornell as the freshman crew coach in 1955, before taking over the varsity team at Columbia University in 1960. After a stint as head coach at Boston University, Ullrich took over the boathouse at the United States Naval Academy in 1968, where he served as head coach and assistant athletic director for over a decade.

== Administrative career ==
Ullrich arrived at West Point in 1980, making his mark on the Army football program two years later with the hiring of head coach Jim Young. Under Young's wishbone system, the Black Knights returned to relevance, turning in six winning seasons, capturing the Commander-In-Chief's Trophy three times, and reaching the first three bowls in Army football history. During this time Ullrich served as President of the Metro Atlantic Athletic Conference and on the executive committee of the National Association of Collegiate Directors of Athletics.

From his post at West Point, Ullrich transitioned to become the first Executive Director of the Patriot League. Under his leadership the conference expanded its offerings from football to a full slate of 22 intercollegiate sports. After retiring to North Carolina, he served two separate stints as athletic director for St. Andrews Presbyterian College.

== Awards and honors ==
Ullrich has been inducted into the athletic Hall of Fame for West Point, St. Andrews Presbyterian College, Eastern College Athletic Conference and National Association of Collegiate Directors of Athletics, respectively, honored as a "Significant Sig" by Sigma Chi fraternity, and received the ECAC's James Lynah Award for distinguished achievement.
