= 2021 Patriot League Football Championship Game =

- Conference Championship
Holy Cross Crusaders	Bucknell Bison
(2–0)	(2–1)
33	10
Head coach: Bob Chesney	Head coach: Dave Cecchini
	1	2	3	4	Total
Holy Cross	17	0	7	9	33
Bucknell	0	7	3	0	10
- Date: April 17, 2021
- Season: 2020
- Stadium: Christy Mathewson–Memorial Stadium
- Location: Lewisburg, Pennsylvania

United States TV coverage
- Network: CBSSN
- Announcers: Jason Knapp (play-by-play), and Ross Tucker (analyst)

2020 Patriot League football standings
	Conf.			Overall
Team	W		L	W		L
North Division
Holy Cross $^	2	–	0	3	–	1
Fordham	2	–	1	2	–	1
Colgate	0	–	2	0	–	2
South Division
Bucknell	2	–	1	2	–	2
Lafayette	2	–	1	2	–	1
Lehigh	0	–	3	0	–	3
Championship: Holy Cross 33, Bucknell 10
$ – Conference champion; ^ – FCS playoff participant; Notes: Due to COVID-19, the Patriot League suspended the fall 2020 football season. Georgetown opted out of the spring football season.; Rankings from STATS Poll

The 2021 Patriot League Football Championship Game was a college football game played on Saturday April 17, 2021, to determine the 2020–21 champion of the Patriot League. The game featured the south division champions Bucknell Bison and the North division champions Holy Cross Crusaders in the conference's first championship game. The game was held because the Patriot League split into two divisions for the first time in its history, after the Georgetown Hoyas opted out of the 2021 spring football season.

== Teams ==
The game was played between the Holy Cross Crusaders and the Bucknell Bison. This was the 37th overall meeting between the programs; Holy Cross entered the game leading the all-time series, 23–13.

=== Holy Cross Crusaders ===
Holy Cross entered the game with a 2–0 record. They finished first in the north division of the Patriot League. Holy Cross had been the Patriot League champions 7 times prior in 1986, 1987, 1989, 1990, 1991, 2009, 2019.

=== Bucknell Bison ===
Bucknell entered the game with a 2–1 record. They finished first in the south division of the Patriot League. Bucknell has only won the Patriot League championship once, in 1996.

== Game summary ==
2020 Patriot League Football Championship Game

Quarter	1	2	3	4	Total
Holy Cross	17	0	7	9	33
Bucknell	0	7	3	0	10

at Christy Mathewson–Memorial Stadium, Lewisburg, PA

- Date: Saturday, April 17, 2021
- Game time: 2 p.m. EST
- Game weather: Cloudy • Temperature: 55 °F (13 °C) • Wind: NW 6 mph
- Game attendance: 996
- TV announcers (CBSSN): Jason Knapp (play-by-play), and Ross Tucker (analyst)
- Box Score:

Game information

First quarter

- (4:31) Holy Cross – Matthew Sluka 6-yard run (Derek Ng kick) (Drive: 10 plays, 85 yards, 4:31; Holy Cross 7–0)
- (6:55) Holy Cross – Derek Ng 26-yard field goal (Drive: 4 plays, 6 yards, 2:08; Holy Cross 10–0)
- (14:54) Holy Cross – Byron Shipman 6-yard pass from Matthew Sluka (Derek Ng kick) (Drive: 12 plays, 51 yards, 6:25; Holy Cross 17–0)

Second quarter

- (10:40) Bucknell – Logan Bitikofer 3-yard run (Ethan Torres kick) (Drive: 3 plays, 35 yards, 0:24; Holy Cross 17–7)

Third quarter

- (5:49) Bucknell – Ethan Torres 28-yard field goal (Drive: 14 plays, 64 yards, 5:49; Holy Cross 17–10)
- (6:47) Holy Cross – Peter Oliver 37-yard run (Derek Ng kick) (Drive: 3 plays, 45 yards, 0:56; Holy Cross 24–10)

Fourth quarter

- (4:09) Holy Cross – Matthew Sluka 15-yard run, Derek Ng kick (Drive: 5 plays, 20 yards, 2:45; Holy Cross 31–10)
- (5:53) Holy Cross – Team 10-yard safety (Holy Cross 33–10)
