= Joe Conlin =

American football player and coach (born 1979)

Current position
- Title: Head coach
- Team: Fordham
- Conference: Patriot League
- Record: 33–55

Biographical details
- Born: June 22, 1979 (age 47); Greensburg, Pennsylvania, U.S.

Playing career
- 1997–2001: Pittsburgh
- Position: Defensive tackle

Coaching career (HC unless noted)
- 2002: Greensburg Central HS (PA) (TE/DE)
- 2003: West Virginia Tech (DL)
- 2004–2007: New Hampshire (DL)
- 2008: New Hampshire (DB)
- 2009–2010: New Hampshire (OL)
- 2011: Harvard (OL)
- 2012–2013: Yale (OL)
- 2014–2017: Yale (AHC/OC/OL)
- 2018–present: Fordham

Head coaching record
- Overall: 32–55
- Tournaments: 0–1

Joe Conlin is an American football coach who is currently the head football coach at Fordham University. He previously served as an assistant football coach at Yale University, Harvard University, the University of New Hampshire, and West Virginia University Institute of Technology; he won two Ivy League titles (2011 - Harvard Crimson, 2017 - Yale Bulldogs) as an assistant coach. Conlin played college football at the University of Pittsburgh, where he played defensive tackle. Conlin was named head football coach at Fordham University on December 22, 2017.

Conlin had four shoulder surgeries during his college football playing career. Conlin and his wife, Karen, have three daughters, Hannah, Katie and Emily.

== Head coaching record ==
Year	Team	Overall	Conference	Standing	Bowl/playoffs	STATS^{#}	Coaches^{°}
Fordham Rams (Patriot League) (2018–present)
2018	Fordham	2–9	2–4	T–4th			
2019	Fordham	4–8	2–4	6th			
2020–21	Fordham	2–1	2–1	2nd (North)			
2021	Fordham	6–5	4–2	3rd			
2022	Fordham	9–3	5–1	2nd	L NCAA Division I First Round	22	16
2023	Fordham	6–5	2–4	5th			
2024	Fordham	2–10	2–4	T–4th			
2025	Fordham	1–11	1–6	8th			
2026	Fordham	2–5	2–2				
Fordham:		34–57	22–28				
Total:		34–57					
