= 2020 Bucknell Bison football team =

American college football season

2020 Bucknell Bison football

Patriot League Championship Game, L 10–33 vs. Holy Cross
- Conference: Patriot League
- North Division
- Record: 2–2 (2–1 Patriot)
- Head coach: Dave Cecchini (2nd season)
- Offensive coordinator: Jason Miran (2nd season)
- Defensive coordinator: Ryan Manalac (2nd season)
- Home stadium: Christy Mathewson–Memorial Stadium

2020 Patriot League football standings
	Conf.			Overall
Team	W		L	W		L
North Division
Holy Cross $^	2	–	0	3	–	1
Fordham	2	–	1	2	–	1
Colgate	0	–	2	0	–	2
South Division
Bucknell	2	–	1	2	–	2
Lafayette	2	–	1	2	–	1
Lehigh	0	–	3	0	–	3
Championship: Holy Cross 33, Bucknell 10
$ – Conference champion; ^ – FCS playoff participant; Notes: Due to COVID-19, the Patriot League suspended the fall 2020 football season. Georgetown opted out of the spring football season.; Rankings from STATS Poll

The 2020 Bucknell Bison football team represented Bucknell University in the 2020–21 NCAA Division I FCS football season. The team was led by second-year head coach Dave Cecchini and played its home games at Christy Mathewson–Memorial Stadium as a member of the Patriot League.

On July 13, 2020, the Patriot League announced that it would cancel its fall sports seasons due to the COVID-19 pandemic. The league announced a spring schedule on February 5, with the first games set to be played on March 13.

== Schedule ==
Bucknell had games scheduled against Penn on September 19, Princeton on September 19, and Cornell on October 3, which were all later canceled before the start of the 2020 season.

Date	Time	Opponent	Site	TV	Result	Attendance
March 27	4:00 p.m.	Lafayette	Christy Mathewson–Memorial Stadium; Lewisburg, PA	ESPN+	W 38–13	
April 3	12:00 p.m.	at Lehigh	Goodman Stadium; Bethlehem, PA	ESPN+	W 6–0	
April 10	1:00 p.m.	Fordham	Christy Mathewson–Memorial Stadium; Lewisburg, PA	ESPN+	L 17–31	
April 17	2:00 p.m.	Holy Cross	Christy Mathewson–Memorial Stadium; Lewisburg, PA (Patriot League Championship Game)	CBSSN	L 10–33	
Rankings from STATS Poll released prior to the game; All times are in Eastern time
