= Dave Cecchini =

American football coach

Playing career
- 1992–1993: Lehigh
- Position: Wide receiver

Coaching career (HC unless noted)
- 1995–2002: Lehigh (assistant)
- 2003–2006: Harvard (OC/QB/WR)
- 2007–2009: The Citadel (OC/WR)
- 2010–2013: Lehigh (OC/QB)
- 2014–2018: Valparaiso
- 2019–2025: Bucknell

Head coaching record
- Overall: 41–86

Accomplishments and honors

Championships
- Patriot League South Division (2021)

Dave Cecchini is an American college football coach. He was announced as the 27th head coach for Bucknell University in February 2019 but was fired in December 2025. Previously, in 2014, he was hired as head football coach at Valparaiso University in Valparaiso, Indiana. Before coming to Valparaiso, Cecchini worked as an assistant coach at Harvard University, The Citadel, and Lehigh University. Cecchini graduated from Lehigh in 1995.

== Head coaching record ==
Year	Team	Overall	Conference	Standing	Bowl/playoffs
Valparaiso Crusaders (Pioneer Football League) (2014–2018)
2014	Valparaiso	4–8	2–6	T–9th	
2015	Valparaiso	1–9	1–7	T–8th	
2016	Valparaiso	4–7	3–5	T–7th	
2017	Valparaiso	6–5	5–3	T–3rd	
2018	Valparaiso	2–9	2–6	T–7th	
Valparaiso:		17–38	13–27		
Bucknell Bison (Patriot League) (2019–2025)
2019	Bucknell	3–8	3–3	T–3rd	
2020–21	Bucknell	2–2	2–1	T–1st (South)	
2021	Bucknell	1–10	0–6	7th	
2022	Bucknell	3–8	2–4	T–4th	
2023	Bucknell	4–7	1–5	T–7th	
2024	Bucknell	6–6	4–2	3rd	
2025	Bucknell	5–7	2–5	7th	
Bucknell:		24–48	13–26		
Total:		41–86			
