= 2020 Holy Cross Crusaders football team =

American college football season

2020 Holy Cross Crusaders football

Patriot League champion

Patriot League Football Championship Game, W 33–10 vs. Bucknell

NCAA Division I First Round, L 3–31 vs. South Dakota State
- Conference: Patriot League
- North Division

Ranking
- FCS Coaches: No. 25
- Record: 3–1 (2–0 Patriot)
- Head coach: Bob Chesney (3rd season)
- Offensive coordinator: Justin Roper (1st season)
- Offensive scheme: Multiple
- Defensive coordinator: Scott James (3rd season)
- Base defense: 4–3
- Home stadium: Fitton Field

2020 Patriot League football standings
	Conf.			Overall
Team	W		L	W		L
North Division
Holy Cross $^	2	–	0	3	–	1
Fordham	2	–	1	2	–	1
Colgate	0	–	2	0	–	2
South Division
Bucknell	2	–	1	2	–	2
Lafayette	2	–	1	2	–	1
Lehigh	0	–	3	0	–	3
Championship: Holy Cross 33, Bucknell 10
$ – Conference champion; ^ – FCS playoff participant; Notes: Due to COVID-19, the Patriot League suspended the fall 2020 football season. Georgetown opted out of the spring football season.; Rankings from STATS Poll

The 2020 Holy Cross Crusaders football team represented the College of the Holy Cross in the 2020–21 NCAA Division I FCS football season. The Crusaders, led by third-year head coach Bob Chesney, played their home games at Fitton Field as a member of the Patriot League.

On July 13, 2020, the Patriot League announced that it would cancel its fall sports seasons due to the COVID-19 pandemic. The league announced a spring schedule on February 5, with the first games set to be played on March 13.

== Schedule ==
Holy Cross had game scheduled against Yale on September 19, Harvard on October 3, and Brown on October 10, which were all later canceled before the start of the 2020 season.

Date	Time	Opponent	Site	TV	Result	Attendance
March 13	12:00 p.m.	at Lehigh	Goodman Stadium; Bethlehem, PA	ESPN+	W 20–3	
March 27	1:00 p.m.	Fordham	Fitton Field; Worcester, MA (Ram–Crusader Cup)	ESPN+	W 34–24	
April 10	5:00 p.m.	at Colgate	Crown Field at Andy Kerr Stadium; Hamilton, NY	ESPN+	Canceled	
April 17	2:00 p.m.	at Bucknell	Christy Mathewson–Memorial Stadium; Lewisburg, PA (Patriot League Championship Game)	CBSSN	W 33–10	
April 24	3:00 p.m.	at No. 2 South Dakota State	Dana J. Dykhouse Stadium; Brookings, SD (FCS Playoffs First Round)	ESPN3	L 3–31	
Rankings from STATS Poll released prior to the game; All times are in Eastern time
