= Patriot League =

U.S. college athletic conference

- Formerly: Colonial League
- Association: NCAA
- Founded: 1986; 40 years ago
- Commissioner: Jennifer Heppel (since 2015)
- Sports fielded: 24; men's: 11; women's: 13
- Division: Division I
- Subdivision: FCS
- No. of teams: 10 full, 4 associate
- Headquarters: Bethlehem, Pennsylvania
- Region: Northeast, Mid-Atlantic
- Broadcasters: CBS Sports; ESPN
- Website: patriotleague.org

Locations

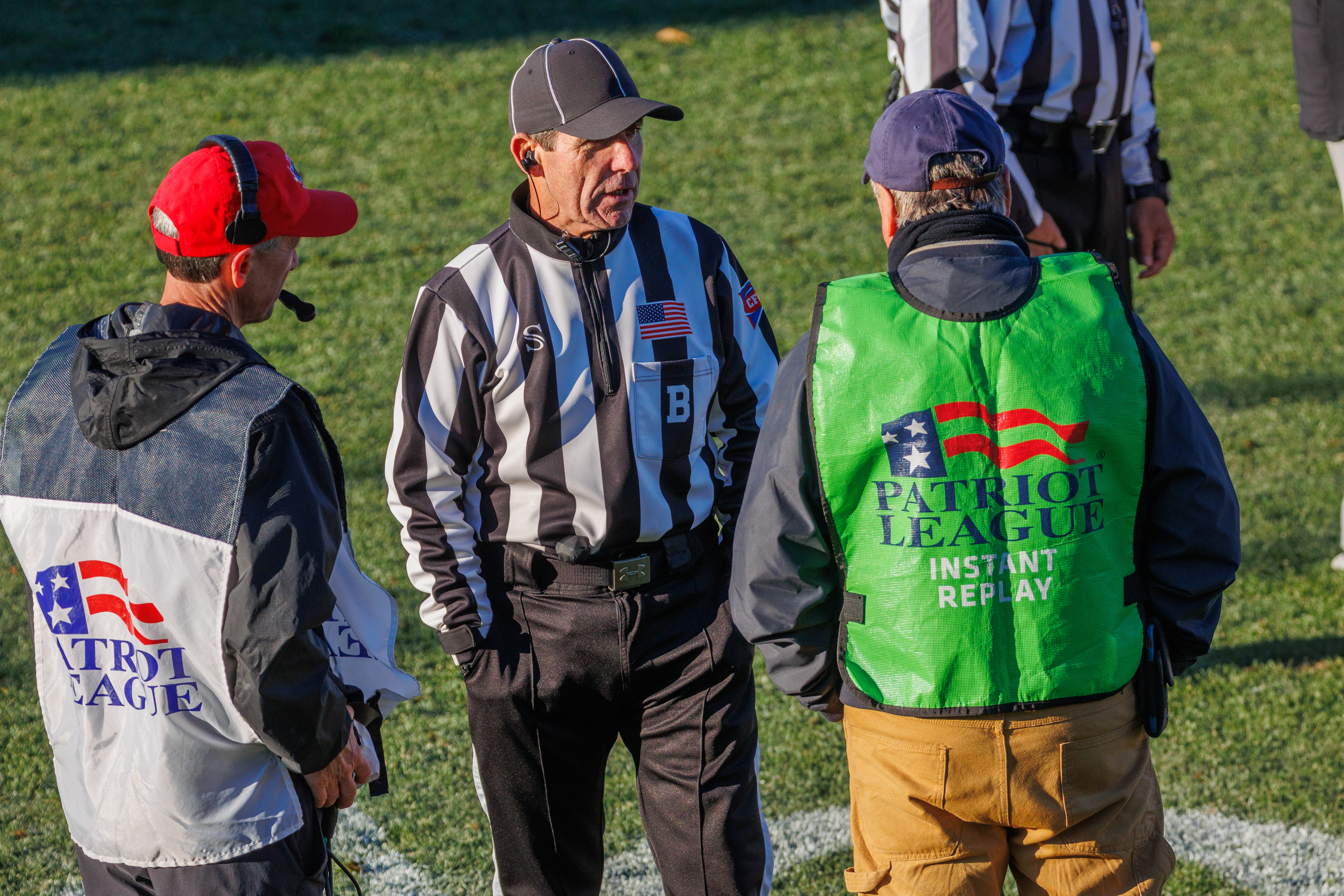
Patriot League football officials and referee

The Patriot League is an intercollegiate athletic conference comprising primarily leading private institutions of higher education and two United States service academies based in the Northeastern United States. Except for the Ivy League, it is the most selective group of higher education institutions in the National Collegiate Athletic Association (NCAA) Division I and has a very high student-athlete graduation rate for both the NCAA graduation success rate and the federal graduation rate.

The Patriot League has 10 core members: American University, the United States Military Academy (Army), Boston University, Bucknell University, Colgate University, College of the Holy Cross, Lafayette College, Lehigh University, Loyola University Maryland, and the United States Naval Academy (Navy). Since the conference does not offer every available NCAA sport, most schools are affiliated with other collegiate conferences for sports such as ice hockey and wrestling, and five other schools whose home conferences do not sponsor sports that they offer are associate members of the Patriot League for those sports.

Only half of the conference's core members compete in the Patriot League for football, as part of the NCAA Division I Football Championship Subdivision (FCS): Bucknell, Colgate, Holy Cross, Lafayette, and Lehigh. Of the five other conference members, American, Boston University, and Loyola Maryland do not sponsor football, while Army and Navy play in the NCAA Division I Football Bowl Subdivision as football-only members of the American Athletic Conference (The American).

Six other institutions are Patriot League members only for specific sports, and are referred to as associate members. Fordham University, Georgetown University, Villanova University, the College of William & Mary, and the University of Richmond are associate members in football, while Georgetown and the Massachusetts Institute of Technology (MIT) are associate members in women's rowing.

== About ==
Patriot League members are schools with very strong academic reputations that adhere strongly to the ideal of the "scholar-athlete", with the emphasis on "scholar". An academic index ensures that athletes are truly representative of and integrated with the rest of the student body. Out-of-league play for Patriot League schools is often with members of the Ivy League, which follow similar philosophies regarding academics and athletics.

Patriot League members have some of the oldest collegiate athletic programs in the country. In particular, "The Rivalry" between Lehigh University and Lafayette College is both the nation's most-played and longest-uninterrupted college football series.

The winner of the Patriot League basketball tournament receives an automatic invitation to the NCAA Division I basketball tournament every March. In recent years, Bucknell (twice) and Lehigh have both won NCAA tournament games. The Patriot League champions in a number of other sports also receive an automatic invitation to their respective NCAA tournaments.

== History ==
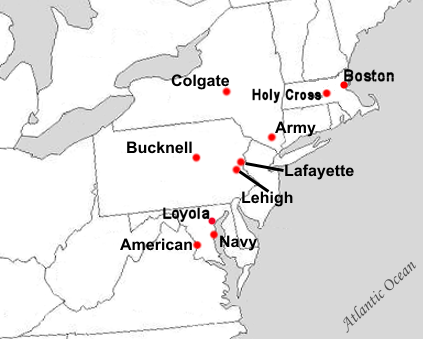
Locations of current Patriot League full member institutions.

The origins of the Patriot League began after the eight Ivy League schools expanded their football schedules to ten games starting in 1980. Needing opponents with a similar competitive level on a regular basis for each team's three nonconference games, the league contacted two university presidents, the Reverend John E. Brooks, S.J., of Holy Cross, and Peter Likins of Lehigh, about forming a new conference that also prohibited athletic scholarships. The result was the Colonial League, a football-only circuit that began competition in 1986. Its six charter members were Holy Cross, Lehigh, Bucknell, Colgate, Lafayette, and Davidson. Davidson dropped out after the 1988 season for reasons related to geography, lack of competitiveness, and a reluctance to relinquish its basketball scholarships in case the conference expanded into other sports.

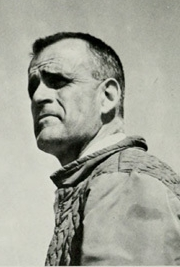
Carl F. Ullrich

In 1990, the league changed its name to the Patriot League at the suggestion of Carl F. Ullrich, who would go on to become the conference's first full-time administrator. At the start of the 1990–91 academic year, the league became an all-sport conference, with 22 sports (11 for men and 11 for women), and now had seven full members, including Fordham and the United States Military Academy (Army) as new members. In 1991, the league gained an eighth full member, the United States Naval Academy (Navy).

In 1993, the league hired Constance (Connie) H. Hurlbut as executive director. She was the first woman and youngest person to be the leader of an NCAA Division I conference.

In 1995, Fordham resigned its full membership (leaving the league with seven full members) but continued as an associate member in football. In 1996, Fairfield and Ursinus joined as associate members in field hockey. (Fairfield left after the 2003 fall season and is now an associate member of the Northeast Conference. Ursinus left after the 2001 fall season and is now a full member of the Division III Centennial Conference.) In 1997, Towson joined as an associate member in football. (Towson left after the 2003 fall season to join the Atlantic 10 Conference, whose football conference would be absorbed by the Colonial Athletic Association, now the Coastal Athletic Association, in 2007.) In 1999, Hobart joined as an associate member in men's lacrosse and Villanova joined as an associate member in women's lacrosse. (Hobart left after the 2004 spring season, to join the ECAC Lacrosse League, while Villanova left after the 2006 spring season.) In 2001, American University joined as the eighth full member and Georgetown University joined as an associate member in football. Two schools announced in summer 2012 that they would join the league for the 2013–14 academic year, with Boston University making its announcement on June 15, and Loyola University Maryland doing so on August 29.

In May 2024, the University of Richmond, who at the time was already an associate member of the league for women's golf, announced that they would also move their football program to the Patriot League for the 2025 season, becoming the Patriot League's first new football-playing member in over 20 years.

On April 25, 2025, the College of William & Mary announced that it would be joining the Patriot League as a football-only associate member, starting in the 2026 season. The move similarly follows that of fellow in-state football rival University of Richmond, and brings the historic "Capital Cup" rivalry series between both schools into the Patriot league conference schedule. About six weeks later on June 5, Big East Conference member Villanova University announced it would also join Patriot League football in 2026, which creates another natural rivalry in Georgetown (a well known basketball rivalry).

=== Athletic scholarships ===
While Patriot League colleges have always offered need-based financial aid, league members have only been allowed to give athletic scholarships in recent years. Basketball scholarships were first allowed beginning with freshmen entering the league in the fall of 1998.

In 2001, when the league admitted American, which gave scholarships in all its sports (AU does not play football), the league began allowing all schools to do so in sports other than football. Lafayette, the last holdout with no athletic scholarships, began granting full rides in basketball and other sports with freshmen entering the school in the fall of 2006. Most Patriot League schools do not give athletic scholarships in a number of sports, and Bucknell only granted them in basketball prior to the addition of football scholarships in 2013.

In the spring of 2009, Fordham University announced that it would start offering football scholarships in the fall of 2010. This action made Fordham ineligible for the league championship in that sport, but it also prompted a league-wide discussion on football scholarships. On February 13, 2012, the Patriot League announced its members could begin offering football scholarships starting with the 2013–14 academic year. Since then, each school has been allowed no more than the equivalent of 15 scholarships to incoming football players. Presidents from six of the seven football schools indicated they would award scholarships in the fall of 2012. Georgetown University did not commit to offering scholarships. Since the transition to scholarship football was completed for the 2016–17 academic year, each football member has been allowed up to 60 scholarship equivalents per season, a total only slightly lower than the NCAA limit of 63 scholarship equivalents for FCS programs. Currently, Patriot League schools are permitted to offer up to the NCAA maximum of 63 scholarships for its football programs.

=== Chronological timeline ===
- 1986 — The Patriot League was founded as a football-only league known as the Colonial League. Charter members included Bucknell University, Colgate University, Davidson College, the College of the Holy Cross, Lafayette College and Lehigh University, beginning the 1986 fall season (1986–87 academic year).
- 1989:
  - Davidson left the Colonial League after the 1988 fall season (1988–89 academic year).
  - Fordham University joined the Colonial League in the 1989 fall season (1989–90 academic year).
- 1990:
  - The Colonial League renamed itself as the Patriot League, while rebranding itself as a multi-sport conference (with Bucknell, Colgate, Fordham, Holy Cross, Lafayette and Lehigh as charter members while upgrading for all sports), beginning the 1990–91 academic year.
  - The United States Military Academy (Army) joined the Patriot League in the 1990–91 academic year.
- 1991 – The United States Naval Academy (Navy) joined the Patriot League in the 1991–92 academic year.
- 1995 – Fordham left the Patriot League to join the Atlantic 10 Conference (A10) after the 1994–95 academic year; while remaining in the conference as an associate member for football, beginning the 1995 fall season (1995–96 academic year).
- 1996 – Fairfield University and Ursinus College joined the Patriot League as associate members for field hockey in the 1996 fall season (1996–97 academic year).
- 1997 – Towson University (formerly Towson State University) joined the Patriot League as an associate member for football in the 1997 fall season (1997–98 academic year).
- 1998 – Villanova University joined the Patriot League as an associate member for women's lacrosse in the 1999 spring season (1998–99 academic year).
- 1999 – Hobart College joined the Patriot League as an associate member for men's lacrosse in the 2000 spring season (1999–2000 academic year).
- 2001:
  - American University joined the Patriot League in the 2001–02 academic year.
  - Georgetown University joined the Patriot League as an associate member for football in the 2001 fall season (2001–02 academic year).
- 2002 – Ursinus left the Patriot League as an associate member for women's lacrosse after the 2002 spring season (2001–02 academic year).
- 2004 – Two institutions left the Patriot League as associate members, both effective after the 2004 spring season (2003–04 academic year):
  - Fairfield for field hockey
  - and Hobart for men's lacrosse
- 2009 – The Massachusetts Institute of Technology (MIT) joined the Patriot League as an associate member for women's rowing in the 2010 spring season (2009–10 academic year).
- 2013:
  - Boston University and Loyola University of Maryland joined the Patriot League in the 2013–14 academic year.
  - Georgetown added women's rowing into its Patriot League associate membership in the 2014 spring season (2013–14 academic year).
- 2014 – The University of Richmond joined the Patriot League as an associate member for women's golf in the 2015 spring season (2014–15 academic year).
- 2024 – Richmond left the Patriot League as an associate member for women's golf after the 2024 spring season (2023–24 academic year).
- 2025 – Richmond rejoined the Patriot League as an associate member, this time for football, in the 2025 fall season (2025–26 academic year).
- 2026 – The College of William and Mary and Villanova University joined the Patriot League as associate members for football, beginning the 2026 fall season (2026–27 academic year).

== Executive directors ==
| Name | Years | Current |
|---|---|---|
| Alan Childs | 1986–1989 | Lafayette College Professor of Psychology |
| Carl F. Ullrich | 1989–1993 | League's first full-time Executive Director; retired |
| Connie Hurlbut | 1993–1999 | Western Athletic Conference Deputy Commissioner and SWA |
| Carolyn Schlie Femovich | 1999–2015 | The PICTOR Group Senior Partner |
| Jennifer Heppel | 2015–present | Previously Big Ten Conference Associate Commissioner for Governance |

== Member schools ==
=== Full members ===
There are ten "full" member schools:

| Institution | Location | Founded | Type | Undergraduate enrollment | Endowment (millions) | Nickname | Joined (Note: Represents the calendar year when fall sports competition begins.) | Colors |
|---|---|---|---|---|---|---|---|---|
| American University (Note: American, Boston University, and Loyola do not play football. As of the 2026 season, Army and Navy participate in the NCAA Football Bowl Subdivision (formerly Division I-A) as football-only members of the American Conference. Fordham, Georgetown, Richmond, Villanova, and William & Mary replace them in the Patriot League for football only.) | Washington, D.C. | 1893 | United; Methodist | 8,463 | $1,120 | Eagles | 2001 | |
| United States Military Academy (Army) | West Point, New York | 1802 | Federal (Military) | 4,594 | N/A | Black Knights | 1990 | |
| Boston University | Boston, Massachusetts | 1839 | Nonsectarian (Note: Historically affiliated with the United Methodist Church.) | 18,229 | $3,350 | Terriers | 2013 | |
| Bucknell University | Lewisburg, Pennsylvania | 1846 | Nonsectarian | 3,724 | $1,260 | Bison | 1986 | |
| Colgate University | Hamilton, New York | 1819 | Nonsectarian | 3,164 | $1,202 | Raiders | 1986 | |
| College of the Holy Cross | Worcester, Massachusetts | 1843 | Catholic (Jesuit) | 3,138 | $1,230 | Crusaders | 1986 | |
| Lafayette College | Easton, Pennsylvania | 1826 | Nonsectarian (Note: Historically affiliated with the Presbyterian Church in the United States of America (not to be confused with the current Presbyterian Church (USA)).) | 2,725 | $1,125 | Leopards | 1986 | |
| Lehigh University | Bethlehem, Pennsylvania | 1865 | Nonsectarian | 5,451 | $1,400 | Mountain Hawks | 1986 | |
| Loyola University Maryland | Baltimore, Maryland | 1852 | Catholic (Jesuit) | 3,787 | $308 | Greyhounds | 2013 | |
| United States Naval Academy (Navy) | Annapolis, Maryland | 1845 | Federal (Military) | 4,528 | N/A | Midshipmen | 1991 | |

=== Associate members ===
There are six associate member schools:

| Institution | Location | Founded | Type | Undergraduate enrollment | Nickname | Joined (Note: Represents the calendar year when fall sports competition begins.) | Colors | PL sport(s) | Primary conference |
|---|---|---|---|---|---|---|---|---|---|
| Fordham University (Note: Fordham was also a full member of the Patriot League from 1990–91 until 1994–95, when it moved all sports except football to the Atlantic 10 Conference (A-10).) | Bronx, New York | 1841 | Catholic (Jesuit) | 9,904 | Rams | 1995 | | Football | Atlantic 10 (A-10) |
| Georgetown University | Washington, D.C. | 1789 | Catholic (Jesuit) | 7,598 | Hoyas | 2001 | | Football | Big East |
| Georgetown University | Washington, D.C. | 1789 | Catholic (Jesuit) | 7,598 | Hoyas | 2013 | | Women's rowing | Big East |
| Massachusetts Institute of Technology (MIT) | Cambridge, Massachusetts | 1861 | Nonsectarian | 4,638 | Engineers | 2009 | | Women's rowing | New England (NEWMAC) (Note: Currently an NCAA Division III athletic conference.) |
| University of Richmond | Richmond, Virginia | 1830 | Nonsectarian | 3,164 | Spiders | 2025 | | Football | Atlantic 10 (A-10) |
| Villanova University | Villanova, Pennsylvania | 1842 | Catholic (Augustinian) | 11,023 | Wildcats | 2026 | | Football | Big East |
| College of William & Mary | Williamsburg, Virginia | 1693 | Public | 7,063 | Tribe | 2026 | | Football | Coastal (CAA) |

=== Former full members ===
| Institution | Location | Founded | Type | Undergraduate enrollment | Nickname | Joined (Note: Represents the calendar year when fall sports competition begins.) | Left (Note: Represents the calendar year when spring sports competition ends.) | Current conference |
|---|---|---|---|---|---|---|---|---|
| Fordham University (Note: Fordham remains as an associate member of the Patriot League for football.) | Bronx, New York | 1841 | Catholic (Jesuit) | 8,220 | Rams | 1990 | 1995 | Atlantic 10 (A-10) |

=== Former associate members ===
| Institution | Location | Founded | Type | Nickname | Joined (Note: Represents the calendar year when fall sports competition begins.) | Left (Note: Represents the calendar year when spring sports competition ends.) | Colors | PL sport(s) | Primary conference | Current conference in former PL sport(s) |
|---|---|---|---|---|---|---|---|---|---|---|
| Davidson College | Davidson, North Carolina | 1837 | Presbyterian (PCUSA) | Wildcats | 1986 | 1989 | | Football | Atlantic 10 (A-10) | Pioneer (PFL) |
| Fairfield University | Fairfield, Connecticut | 1942 | Catholic (Jesuit) | Stags | 1996 | 2004 | | Field hockey | Metro Atlantic (MAAC) | Northeast (NEC) |
| Hobart College | Geneva, New York | 1822 | Nonsectarian | Statesmen | 1999 | 2004 | | Men's lacrosse | Liberty (LL) (Note: Currently an NCAA Division III athletic conference.) | Atlantic 10 (A-10) |
| University of Richmond | Richmond, Virginia | 1830 | Nonsectarian | Spiders | 2014 | 2024 | | Women's golf | Atlantic 10 (A-10) | |
| Towson University | Towson, Maryland | 1866 | Public | Tigers | 1997 | 2004 | | Football | Coastal (CAA) | CAA Football (Note: CAA Football is technically a separate entity from the multi-sports CAA.) |
| Ursinus College | Collegeville, Pennsylvania | 1869 | Nonsectarian | Bears | 1996 | 2002 | | Field hockey | Centennial | |
| Villanova University | Villanova, Pennsylvania | 1842 | Catholic (Augustinian) | Wildcats | 1998 | 2006 | | Women's lacrosse | Big East | |

=== Membership timeline ===
Full member (all sports) Full member (non-football) Associate member (football) Associate member (sport) Other Conference Other Conference

== Sports ==
The Patriot League sponsors championship competition in 12 men's and 13 women's NCAA-sanctioned sports. Fordham, Georgetown, and Richmond are associate members for football, and Georgetown and MIT are associate members for rowing.

=== Men's sponsored sports by school ===
| School | Baseball | Basketball | Cross Country | FCS Football | Golf | Lacrosse | Soccer | Swimming & Diving | Tennis | Track & Field (Indoor) | Track & Field (Outdoor) | Total |
|---|---|---|---|---|---|---|---|---|---|---|---|---|
| American | No | Yes | Yes | No | No | No | Yes | Yes | No | Yes | Yes | 6 |
| Army | Yes | Yes | Yes | No (Note: Army & Navy play FBS football in the American Conference.) | Yes | Yes | Yes | Yes | Yes | Yes | Yes | 10 |
| Boston | No | Yes | Yes | No | No | Yes | Yes | Yes | Yes | Yes | Yes | 8 |
| Bucknell | Yes | Yes | Yes | Yes | Yes | Yes | Yes | Yes | Yes | Yes | Yes | 11 |
| Colgate | No | Yes | Yes | Yes | Yes | Yes | Yes | Yes | Yes | Yes | Yes | 10 |
| Holy Cross | Yes | Yes | Yes | Yes | Yes | Yes | Yes | Yes | Yes | Yes | Yes | 11 |
| Lafayette | Yes | Yes | Yes | Yes | Yes | Yes | Yes | Yes | Yes | Yes | Yes | 11 |
| Lehigh | Yes | Yes | Yes | Yes | Yes | Yes | Yes | Yes | Yes | Yes | Yes | 11 |
| Loyola | No | Yes | Yes | No | Yes | Yes | Yes | Yes | Yes | No | No | 7 |
| Navy | Yes | Yes | Yes | No | Yes | Yes | Yes | Yes | Yes | Yes | Yes | 10 |
| Totals | 6 | 10 | 10 | 5+5 | 8 | 9 | 10 | 10 | 9 | 9 | 9 | 95+5 |
Associate Members
| Fordham | | | | Yes | | | | | | | | 1 |
| Georgetown | | | | Yes | | | | | | | | 1 |
| Richmond | | | | Yes | | | | | | | | 1 |
| Villanova | | | | Yes | | | | | | | | 1 |
| William & Mary | | | | Yes | | | | | | | | 1 |

==== Men's varsity sports not sponsored by the Patriot League which are played by Patriot League schools ====
| School | Fencing | FBS Football | Sprint Football (Note: This sport is not sponsored by the NCAA.) | Gymnastics | Ice Hockey | Rifle (Note: This sport is coed.) | Rowing | Rugby | Sailing | Squash | Water Polo | Wrestling |
|---|---|---|---|---|---|---|---|---|---|---|---|---|
| American | – | – | – | – | – | – | – | – | – | – | – | EIWA |
| Army | – | American | CSFL | EIGL | AHA | GARC | – | Rugby East | – | – | – | EIWA |
| Boston | – | – | – | – | Hockey East | – | EARC | – | – | – | – | – |
| Bucknell | – | – | – | – | – | – | – | – | – | – | CWPA | EIWA |
| Colgate | – | – | – | – | ECAC Hockey | – | Independent | – | – | – | – | – |
| Holy Cross | – | – | – | – | AHA | – | EARC | – | – | – | – | – |
| Lafayette | MACFA | – | – | – | – | – | – | – | – | – | – | – |
| Lehigh | – | – | – | – | – | – | MARC | – | – | – | – | EIWA |
| Loyola | – | – | – | – | – | – | Independent | – | – | – | – | – |
| Navy | – | American | – | EIGL | – | GARC | EARC | – | ISA | MASC | CWPA | EIWA |

=== Women's sponsored sports by school ===
| School | Basketball | Cross Country | Field Hockey | Golf | Lacrosse | Rowing | Soccer | Softball | Swimming & Diving | Tennis | Track & Field (Indoor) | Track & Field (Outdoor) | Volleyball | Total |
|---|---|---|---|---|---|---|---|---|---|---|---|---|---|---|
| American | Yes | Yes | Yes | No | Yes | No | Yes | No | Yes | No | Yes | Yes | Yes | 9 |
| Army | Yes | Yes | No | No | Yes | No | Yes | Yes | Yes | Yes | Yes | Yes | Yes | 10 |
| Boston | Yes | Yes | Yes | Yes | Yes | Yes | Yes | Yes | Yes | Yes | Yes | Yes | No | 12 |
| Bucknell | Yes | Yes | Yes | Yes | Yes | Yes | Yes | Yes | Yes | Yes | Yes | Yes | Yes | 13 |
| Colgate | Yes | Yes | Yes | No | Yes | Yes | Yes | Yes | Yes | Yes | Yes | Yes | Yes | 12 |
| Holy Cross | Yes | Yes | Yes | Yes | Yes | Yes | Yes | Yes | Yes | Yes | Yes | Yes | Yes | 13 |
| Lafayette | Yes | Yes | Yes | No | Yes | No | Yes | Yes | Yes | Yes | Yes | Yes | Yes | 11 |
| Lehigh | Yes | Yes | Yes | Yes | Yes | Yes | Yes | Yes | Yes | Yes | Yes | Yes | Yes | 13 |
| Loyola | Yes | Yes | No | No | Yes | Yes | Yes | No | Yes | Yes | Yes | Yes | Yes | 10 |
| Navy | Yes | Yes | No | Yes | Yes | Yes | Yes | No | Yes | Yes | Yes | Yes | Yes | 11 |
| Totals | 10 | 10 | 7 | 5 | 10 | 7+2 | 10 | 7 | 10 | 9 | 10 | 10 | 9 | 113+2 |
Associate Members
| Georgetown | | | | | | Yes | | | | | | | | 1 |
| MIT | | | | | | Yes | | | | | | | | 1 |

==== Women's varsity sports not sponsored by the Patriot League which are played by Patriot League schools ====
| School | Fencing | Ice Hockey | Rifle (Note: This sport is coed.) | Lightweight Rowing (Note: This sport is not sponsored by the NCAA.) | Rugby | Sailing | Water Polo | Wrestling |
|---|---|---|---|---|---|---|---|---|
| Army | – | – | GARC | – | NIRA | – | – | – |
| Boston | – | Hockey East | – | EARC | – | – | – | – |
| Bucknell | – | – | – | – | – | – | CWPA | – |
| Colgate | – | ECAC Hockey | – | – | – | – | – | – |
| Holy Cross | – | Hockey East | – | – | – | – | – | – |
| Lafayette | MACFA | – | – | – | – | – | – | – |
| Lehigh | – | – | – | – | – | – | – | Independent |
| Navy | – | – | GARC | – | – | ISA | – | – |

=== President's Cup ===
The Patriot League Presidents' Cup is awarded to the member institution with the highest cumulative sports point total for their Patriot League standings in sponsored men's and women's sports. Points are awarded based upon a combination of an institution's regular-season and tournament finishes in each sport.

President's Cup Winners (combined men and women):

- 1991 - Bucknell
- 1992 - Bucknell
- 1993 - Bucknell
- 1994 - Army
- 1995 - Army
- 1996 - Bucknell
- 1997 - Army
- 1998 - Bucknell
- 1999 - Bucknell
- 2000 - Bucknell
- 2001 - Bucknell
- 2002 - Bucknell
- 2003 - Bucknell
- 2004 - Bucknell
- 2005 - Army
- 2006 - Bucknell
- 2007 - Bucknell
- 2008 - Bucknell
- 2009 - Bucknell
- 2010 - Bucknell
- 2011 - Bucknell
- 2012 - Navy
- 2013 - Bucknell
- 2014 - Navy
- 2015 - Navy
- 2016 - Navy
- 2017 - Navy
- 2018 - Navy
- 2019 - Navy
- 2020 - (COVID-19 pandemic)
- 2021 - Navy
- 2022 - Navy
- 2023 - Navy
- 2024 - Navy
- 2025 - Army
- 2026 - Navy

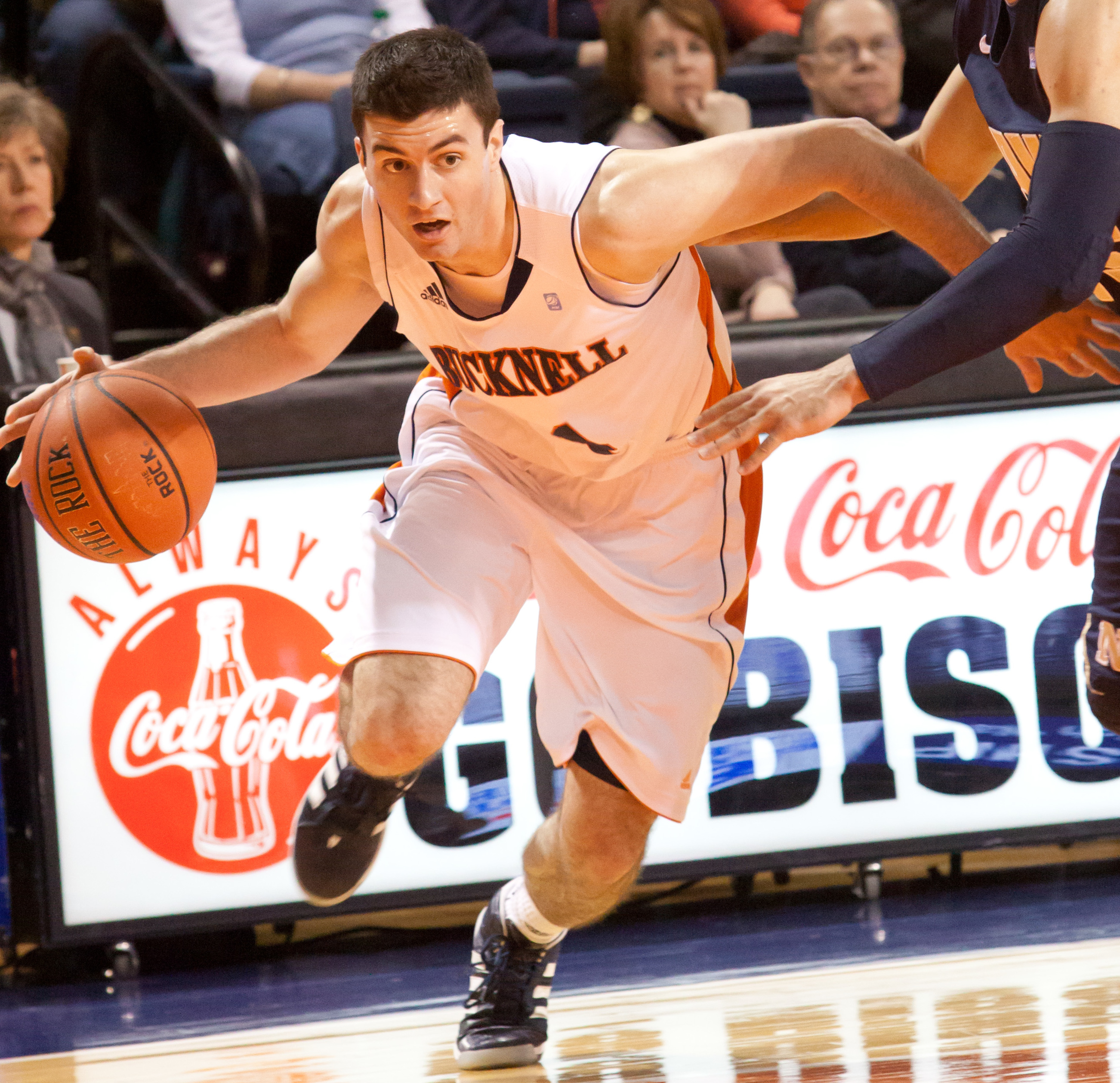
Bryan Cohen

=== Baseball ===
Tournament champion and MVP
See: Patriot League baseball tournament

=== Basketball ===
Men's tournament champion, runner-up, and MVP
See: Patriot League men's basketball tournament

Women's tournament champion
See: Patriot League women's basketball tournament

NCAA

In NCAA basketball, Boston, Bucknell, Navy, Lehigh, and Holy Cross are the only teams in the conference ever to have recorded NCAA Tournament victories. Bucknell won tournament games in 2005 over Kansas and in 2006 over Arkansas. Lehigh won over Duke in the first round in the 2012 tournament.

The Bison, Mountain Hawks, and Crusaders are the only teams to win in the NCAA tournament while actually representing the Patriot League. A Navy team—then representing the Colonial Athletic Association—led by future Hall of Famer David Robinson won three tournament games while advancing to the regional finals in 1986, while BU won two games in the 1959 tournament before falling in the regional finals. Holy Cross was among the best teams in the country in the late 1940s and early 1950s, and won the 1947 national championship with a team that included future Hall of Famer Bob Cousy. Its combined record in the NCAA tournament is 8–12. After a 63-year drought, Holy Cross defeated Southern University in the 2016 NCAA Tournament. Bryan Cohen of Bucknell was named Patriot League Defensive Player of Year in 2010, 2011, and 2012; he was the only player in league history to win the award three times.

=== Field hockey ===
Tournament champion

- 1994 – Lehigh
- 1995 – Lafayette
- 1996 – Colgate
- 1997 – Holy Cross
- 1998 – Holy Cross
- 1999 – Lafayette
- 2000 – Holy Cross
- 2001 – Fairfield
- 2002 – Lafayette
- 2003 – American
- 2004 – American
- 2005 – American
- 2006 – American
- 2007 – American
- 2008 – American
- 2009 – American
- 2010 – American
- 2011 – Lafayette
- 2012 – Lafayette
- 2013 – American
- 2014 – Boston
- 2015 – Boston
- 2016 – American
- 2017 – Boston
- 2018 – Boston
- 2019 – American
- 2020–21 – Bucknell
- 2021 – American
- 2022 – Lehigh
- 2023 – American
- 2024 – Lafayette
- 2025 – Boston

=== Football ===
League champions

- 1986 – Holy Cross
- 1987 – Holy Cross
- 1988 – Lafayette
- 1989 – Holy Cross
- 1990 – Holy Cross
- 1991 – Holy Cross
- 1992 – Lafayette
- 1993 – Lehigh
- 1994 – Lafayette
- 1995 – Lehigh
- 1996 – Bucknell
- 1997 – Colgate
- 1998 – Lehigh
- 1999 – Colgate and Lehigh
- 2000 – Lehigh
- 2001 – Lehigh
- 2002 – Colgate and Fordham
- 2003 – Colgate
- 2004 – Lafayette and Lehigh
- 2005 – Colgate and Lafayette
- 2006 – Lafayette and Lehigh
- 2007 – Fordham
- 2008 – Colgate
- 2009 – Holy Cross
- 2010 – Lehigh
- 2011 – Lehigh
- 2012 – Colgate
- 2013 – Lafayette
- 2014 – Fordham
- 2015 – Colgate
- 2016 – Lehigh
- 2017 – Colgate and Lehigh
- 2018 – Colgate
- 2019 – Holy Cross
- 2020 – Holy Cross
- 2021 – Holy Cross
- 2022 – Holy Cross
- 2023 – Lafayette and Holy Cross
- 2024 – Lehigh and Holy Cross
- 2025 – Lehigh

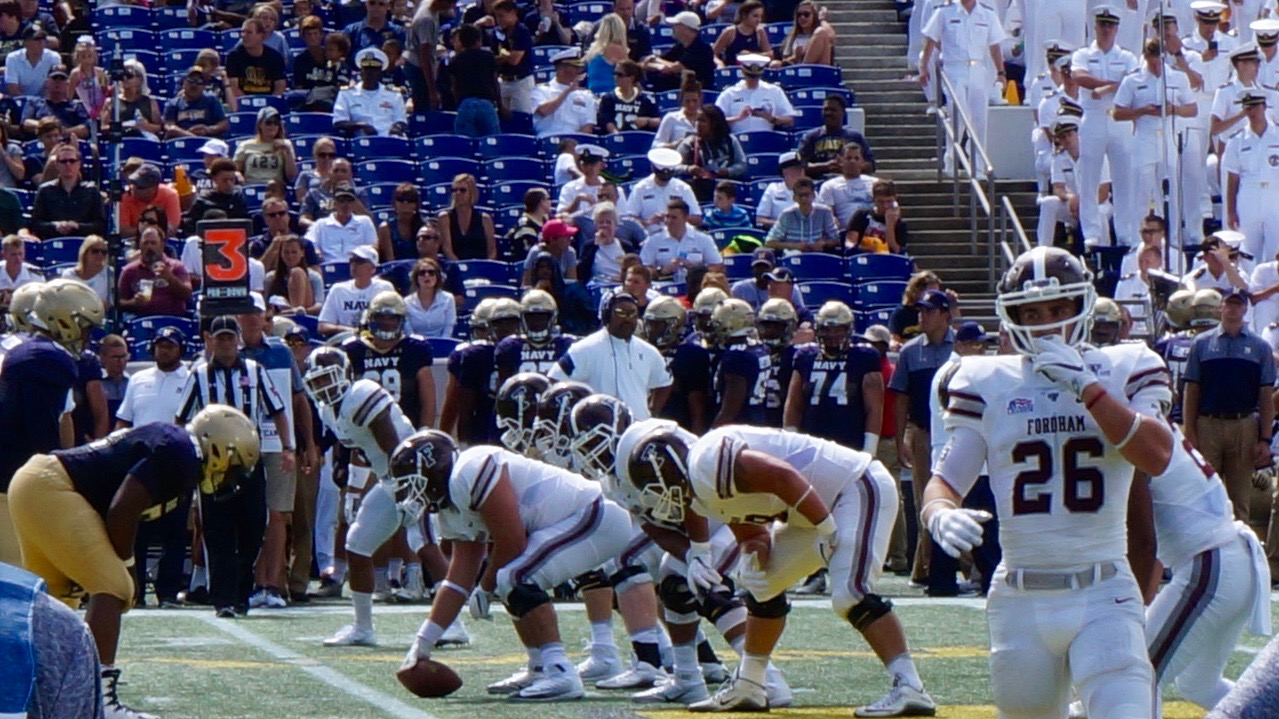
Fordham vs. Navy at Navy–Marine Corps Memorial Stadium, 2016

The Patriot League prohibited athletic scholarships for football from its founding (as the Colonial League) until the league presidents voted to approve football scholarships starting with the 2013 recruiting class. Since then, each school has been allowed no more than the equivalent of 15 scholarships to incoming football players in any given season. With the transition to scholarship football having been completed in 2016, each school is now allowed a maximum of 60 scholarship equivalents per season, three short of the NCAA FCS maximum. However, Georgetown does not offer scholarships.

Until 1997, Patriot League teams did not participate in the NCAA Division I Football Championship playoffs. This practice was in step with the Ivy League's policy of not participating in the playoffs, since the Patriot League was founded with the Ivy League's athletics philosophy. Since 1997, the league champion receives an automatic playoff berth. If there are co-champions, a tie-breaker determines the playoff participant, though the other co-champion is eligible to be selected with an at-large invitation.

Colgate was the first team to receive the league's automatic berth, in 1997. The following year, Lehigh won the league's first playoff game. This was also the first year in which a Patriot League team, Colgate, received a playoff invitation without being a league co-champion. Fordham has since repeated that feat in 2013, 2015 and 2022.

Because the Georgetown Hoyas opted out of the 2020-21 NCAA Division I FCS football season due to the COVID-19 pandemic, the Patriot League split into a north and south division for the first time. This led to the first ever Patriot League Football Championship Game

=== Lacrosse ===
Men's league champions

- 1991 – Army
- 1992 – Army
- 1993 – Army
- 1994 – Army
- 1995 – Army
- 1996 – Bucknell
- 1997 – Army
- 1998 – Army
- 1999 – Army and Lehigh
- 2000 – Hobart and Lehigh
- 2001 – Bucknell
- 2002 – Army, Bucknell and Hobart
- 2003 – Army and Bucknell
- 2004 – Navy
- 2005 – Navy
- 2006 – Navy
- 2007 – Navy
- 2008 – Colgate
- 2009 – Navy
- 2010 – Army
- 2011 – Bucknell
- 2012 – Lehigh
- 2013 – Lehigh
- 2014 – Loyola
- 2015 – Colgate
- 2016 – Loyola
- 2017 – Loyola
- 2018 – Loyola
- 2019 – Army
- 2020 - (COVID-19 pandemic)
- 2021 - Lehigh
- 2022 - Boston
- 2023 - Army
- 2024 - Lehigh
- 2025 – Colgate
- 2026 – Army

As of 2026, the Army Black Knights men's lacrosse team have fourteen conference championships, the most of any school in the conference. Prior to the 2004 season, no conference tournament was held to determine a single winner.

Women's league champions

- 1991 – Lafayette
- 1992 – Lafayette
- 1993 – Lafayette
- 1994 – Lehigh
- 1995 – Lafayette
- 1996 – Lafayette
- 1997 – Lafayette
- 1998 – Lafayette
- 1999 – Colgate
- 2000 – Lafayette
- 2001 – Lafayette
- 2002 – Lafayette
- 2003 – American
- 2004 – Colgate
- 2005 – Colgate
- 2006 – Holy Cross
- 2007 – Holy Cross
- 2008 – Colgate
- 2009 – Colgate
- 2010 – Navy
- 2011 – Navy
- 2012 – Navy
- 2013 – Navy
- 2014 – Loyola
- 2015 – Loyola
- 2016 – Loyola
- 2017 – Navy
- 2018 – Navy
- 2019 – Loyola
- 2020 – (COVID-19 pandemic)
- 2021 – Loyola
- 2022 – Loyola
- 2023 – Loyola
- 2024 – Loyola
- 2025 – Navy

=== Soccer ===
Men's tournament champion, runner-up, and MVP
See: Patriot League Men's Soccer Tournament

Women's league champions

- 1990 - Colgate
- 1991 – Colgate
- 1992 – Colgate
- 1993 – Army West Point
- 1994 – Colgate
- 1995 – Colgate
- 1996 – Colgate
- 1997 – Colgate
- 1998 – Colgate
- 1999 – Colgate
- 2000 – Holy Cross
- 2001 – Bucknell
- 2002 – American
- 2003 – Navy
- 2004 – Colgate
- 2005 – Bucknell
- 2006 – Navy
- 2007 – Navy
- 2008 – Army West Point
- 2009 – Colgate
- 2010 – Lehigh
- 2011 – Army West Point
- 2012 – Colgate
- 2013 – Boston
- 2014 – Boston
- 2015 – Boston
- 2016 – Bucknell
- 2017 – Bucknell
- 2018 – Boston
- 2019 – Navy
- 2020–21 – Navy
- 2021 – Bucknell
- 2022 – Bucknell
- 2023 – Bucknell
- 2024 – Boston
- 2025 – Army West Point

== Facilities ==
| School | Football stadium | Capacity | Basketball arena | Capacity | Baseball stadium | Capacity | Soccer venue | Capacity |
|---|---|---|---|---|---|---|---|---|
| American | Non-football school | | Bender Arena | 3,044 | Non-baseball school | | Reeves Field | 700 |
| Army | Non-football member (Note: Army plays football in the American Athletic Conference (FBS). Their home football games are played at Michie Stadium, which seats 38,000.) | | Christl Arena | 5,043 | Johnson Stadium at Doubleday Field | 880 | Clinton Field | 2,000 |
| Boston University | Non-football school | | Agganis Arena; Case Gym | 7,200; 1,800 | Non-baseball school | | Nickerson Field | 10,412 |
| Bucknell | Christy Mathewson-Memorial Stadium | 13,100 | Sojka Pavilion | 4,000 | Eugene B. Depew Field | 500 | Emmitt Field at Holmes Stadium | 1,250 |
| Colgate | Crown Field at Andy Kerr Stadium | 10,221 | Cotterell Court | 3,000 | Non-baseball school | | Beyer-Small '76 Field | 2,000 |
| Holy Cross | Fitton Field | 23,500 | Hart Center | 3,600 | Hanover Insurance Park at Fitton Field | 3,000 | Linda Johnson Smith Soccer Stadium | 1,320 |
| Lafayette | Fisher Stadium | 13,132 | Kirby Sports Center | 2,644 | Kamine Stadium | 500 | Oaks Stadium | 1,000 |
| Lehigh | Goodman Stadium | 16,000 | Stabler Arena | 5,600 | J. David Walker Field at Legacy Park | 370 | Ulrich Sports Complex | 2,400 |
| Loyola | Non-football school | | Reitz Arena | 2,100 | Non-baseball school | | Ridley Athletic Complex | 6,000 |
| Navy | Non-football member (Note: Navy plays football in the American Athletic Conference (FBS). Their home football games are played at Navy-Marine Corps Memorial Stadium, which seats 34,000.) | | Alumni Hall | 5,710 | Max Bishop Stadium | 1,500 | Glenn Warner Soccer Facility | 2,500 |

Football affiliates
| School | Stadium | Capacity |
|---|---|---|
| Fordham | Coffey Field | 7,000 |
| Georgetown (Note: Georgetown is also an affiliate in women's rowing.) | Cooper Field | 4,418 |
| Richmond | E. Claiborne Robins Stadium | 8,217 |
| Villanova | Villanova Stadium | 12,500 |
| William & Mary | Walter J. Zable Stadium | 12,672 |

== Media ==
The Patriot League Network (PLN) was created in collaboration with Campus Insiders on 29 July 2013. The league had previously offered live events via streaming media since the autumn of 2006. The network was absorbed into ESPN+ on 16 September 2020.

== Literature ==
The Patriot League was profiled in the John Feinstein book The Last Amateurs (2000). The title is derived from the belief that the Patriot League was the last Division I basketball league that plays a conference tournament (the Ivy League, which operates under the same model, albeit with no scholarships, did not hold a conference tournament until the 2016–17 season) and functions as a place for student-athletes rather than a de facto minor professional circuit with players not representative of their student bodies. The book is Feinstein's chronicle of all seven of the league's men's basketball teams at the time during the 1999–2000 season.
